= Telephone numbers in Azerbaijan =

- Location of Azerbaijan (green)
- Country: Azerbaijan
- Continent: Europe
- Regulator: Ministry of Digital Development and Transportation
- Numbering plan type: Closed
- Country code: +994
- International access: 00
- Long-distance: 0

Telephone numbers in Azerbaijan are regulated by the Ministry of Digital Development and Transportation. Azerbaijan utilizes a closed numbering plan, meaning the trunk prefix 0 and two-digit area code must always be dialed, even for local calls within the same area.

== Dialing format ==
To call a number within Azerbaijan from another area code or locally, dial the trunk prefix 0, followed by the two-digit area code and seven-digit subscriber number:

- 012 XXX XX XX (Landline in Baku)

To call Azerbaijan from abroad, dial the international access code of the originating country (such as 00 or 011), followed by the country code 994, the two-digit area code (without the trunk prefix 0), and the seven-digit subscriber number:

- +994 12 XXX XX XX

== Area codes ==
On August 1, 2011, Azerbaijan reorganized its national numbering plan for area codes. Only the area codes of Baku (12), Sumqayit (18), and Nakhchivan Autonomous Republic (36) remained unchanged.

Region	Area code	Localities / Districts included
Baku	12	Baku
Sumqayit	18	Sumqayit
Baku region	20	Agdash District, Agsu District, Barda District, Gobustan District, Goychay District, Ismailli District, Kurdamir District, Shamakhi District, Ujar District, Zardab District
Shirvan region	21	Aghjabadi District, Beylagan District, Hajigabul District, Imishli District, Neftchala District, Saatly District, Sabirabad District, Salyan District, Shirvan
Ganja region	22	Agstafa District, Dashkasan District, Gadabay District, Ganja, Goranboy District, Goygol District, Naftalan, Qazakh District, Samukh District, Shamkir District, Tartar District, Tovuz District, Yevlakh District
Quba region	23	Khachmaz District, Khizi District, Quba District, Qusar District, Shabran District, Siazan District
Shaki region	24	Balakan District, Mingachevir, Oghuz District, Qabala District, Qakh District, Shaki District, Zaqatala District
Lankaran region	25	Astara District, Bilasuvar District, Jalilabad District, Lankaran District, Lerik District, Masally District, Yardymli District
Shusha region	26	Agdam District, Fuzuli District, Jabrayil District, Kalbajar District, Khankendi, Khojali District, Khojavend District, Lachin District, Qubadli District, Shusha District, Zangilan District
Nakhchivan Autonomous Republic	36	Babek District, Julfa District, Kangarli District, Nakhchivan, Ordubad District, Sadarak District, Shahbuz District, Sharur District

== Mobile codes ==
Mobile numbers start with 050, 051 and 010 for Azercell, 055 and 099 for Bakcell, 070 and 077 for Nar and 060 for Nakhtel.

== Emergency and Short Codes ==
- 101 – Fire Department
- 102 – Police
- 103 – Ambulance
- 112 – Emergency Management Ministry (General Emergency)

== See also ==
- Telecommunications in Azerbaijan
- Economic regions and districts of Azerbaijan
- Administrative divisions of Azerbaijan
