= List of leaders of Azerbaijan's state security agencies =

The following is a comprehensive ist of leaders of Azerbaijan's state security agencies since the republic's establishment in 1918.

== Azerbaijan Democratic Republic ==
=== Heads of the Organization to struggle against counterrevolution of Azerbaijan Democratic Republic ===
#	Name	Photo	Term in office	Party affiliation
1	Mamedbaghir Sheikhzamanly		June — August 1919	Musavat
2	Naghi Sheikhzamanly		August 1919 — March 1920	Musavat

== Azerbaijan SSR ==
=== Heads of the Azerbaijani Cheka, GPU and OGPU ===
#	Name	Photo	Term in office	Party affiliation
Chairmen of Azerbaijani Extraordinary Commission (Azerbaijani Cheka)
1	Semen Pankratov		May — June 1920	Communist Party
2	Baba Aliyev		June — October 1920	Communist Party
3	Eyyub Hanbudagov		October 1920 — February 1921	Communist Party
4	Mir Jafar Baghirov		February 10, 1920 — 1923	Communist Party
Chairmen of the GPU of the Azerbaijan SSR
1	Mir Jafar Baghirov		1923 — September 7, 1926	Communist Party
Chairmen of the OGPU of the Azerbaijan SSR
1	Mir Jafar Baghirov		September 7, 1926 — May 22, 1927	Communist Party
2	Novruz Rizayev		May 22, 1927 — 1929	Communist Party
3	Mir Jafar Baghirov		September 7, 1929 — August 6, 1930	Communist Party
4	Mikhail Frinovsky		1930 — April 1933	Communist Party
5	Aleksey Agrba		April 19, 1933 — March 31, 1934	AUCP(b)
6	Yuvelian Sumbatov-Topuridze		February 26, 1934 — July 10, 1934	Communist Party

=== Minister of Internal Affairs (Azerbaijan) - People's Commissar of Internal Affairs of Azerbaijan SSR ===
#	Name	Photo	Term in office	Party affiliation
1	Hamid Sultanov		April 28, 1920 - June 1, 1921	Russian Social Democratic Labour Party
2	Mir Jafar Baghirov		October 5, 1921 - May 22, 1927	Communist Party
3	Novruz Rizayev		May 22, 1927 - Jule 10, 1929	Communist Party
	Stepan Yemelianov		August 1, 1929 - ?	Communist Party
	Yuvelyan Sumbatov-Topuridze		January 1, 1937 - January 10, 1938	Communist Party
	Mikhail Rayev		January 10, 1938 - November 12, 1938	Communist Party
	Stepan Yemelianov		February 11, 1939 - February 26, 1941	Communist Party
	Mir Teymur Yagubov		March 6, 1941 - June 1, 1943	Communist Party
	Aghaselim Atakishiyev		July 10, 1943 - June 6, 1953	Communist Party

=== People's Commissar and Ministers of State Security of the Azerbaijan SSR ===
(List incomplete)

#	Name	Photo	Term in office	Party affiliation
People's Commissar of State Security of the Azerbaijan SSR
1	Stepan Yemelianov		February 26 — July 31, 1941	Communist Party
	Stepan Yemelianov		May 7, 1943 — January 1947	Communist Party
Ministers of State Security of the Azerbaijan SSR
1	Stepan Yemelianov		January 1947 — March 16, 1953	Communist Party

=== Minister of Internal Affairs (Azerbaijan) - Ministers of Internal Affairs of Azerbaijan SSR ===
#	Name	Photo	Term in office	Party affiliation
1	Stepan Yemelianov		March 16, 1953 - July 29, 1953	Communist Party
2	Anatoliy Guskov		August 8, 1953 - March 25, 1954	Communist Party

In 1953, the Ministry of Internal Affairs of the Azerbaijan SSR and the Ministry of Public Security of the Azerbaijan SSR were merged into a single Ministry of Internal Affairs of Azerbaijan SSR. In 1954 was founded the KGB of Azerbaijan SSR.

=== Chairmen of the KGB of Azerbaijan SSR ===
#	Name	Photo	Term in office	Party affiliation
1	Anatoliy Guskov		1954 — 1956	Communist Party
2	Fyodor Kopilov		September 26, 1956 — August 1959	Communist Party
3	Alexander Kardashov		August 1959 — October 12, 1963	Communist Party
4	Semen Svigun		October 21, 1963 — 1967	Communist Party
5	Heydar Aliyev		June 21, 1967 — July 14, 1969	Communist Party
6	Vitaliy Krasilnikov		June 1969 — June 18, 1980	Communist Party
7	Ziya Yusifzadeh		1980 — 1988	Communist Party
8	Ivan Gorelovsky		August 11, 1988 — August 19, 1989	Communist Party
9	Vagif Huseynov		August 19, 1989 — September 13, 1991	Communist Party
10	Ilhuseyn Huseynov		September 1991 — May 1992	Communist Party

== Ministers of National Security of Azerbaijan ==
#	Name	Photo	Term in office	Party affiliation
1	Fakhraddin Tahmazov		May 16, 1992 — 1993	
2	Nariman Imranov		1993 — October 15, 1994	
Acting	Namig Abbasov		October 1994 — March 1995	
3	Namig Abbasov		March 1995 — July 2004	
3	Eldar Mahmudov		since July 23, 2004	
