= Baku Security Forum =

International platform dedicated to global and regional security issues

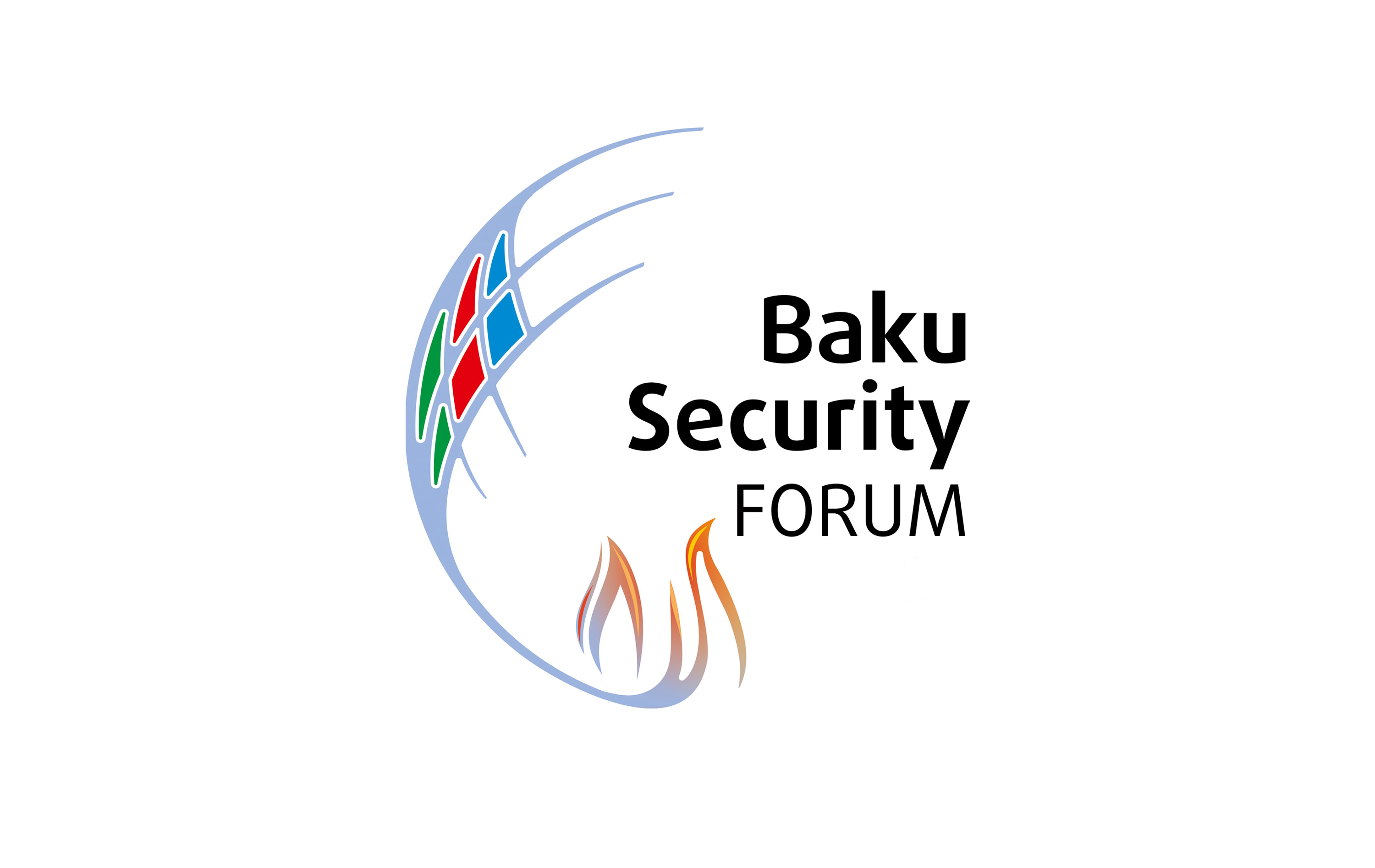
- Native name: Bakı Təhlükəsizlik Forumu
- English name: Baku Security Forum
- Date: September 21, 2025 (III Baku Security Forum)
- Time: (AZT)
- Venue: Baku Convention Center
- Location: Baku, Azerbaijan
- Type: Security Forum
- Theme: Global Security and Cooperation
- Organised by: State Security Service of Azerbaijan
- Participants: Representatives of intelligence and security agencies

The Baku Security Forum is an international platform dedicated to global and regional security issues. It brings together representatives of intelligence and security agencies from various countries to discuss contemporary security challenges, exchange perspectives, and foster cooperation. The forum is organized by the State Security Service of the Azerbaijan.

== Background ==
In the early 21st century, growing geopolitical tensions, regional conflicts, terrorism, and emerging threats to the international security underscored the need for enhanced interstate cooperation. To address these challenges, Azerbaijan launched the Baku Security Forum as a platform for dialogue among security and intelligence communities. The forum upholds the principles of constructive dialogue, mutual understanding, and international cooperation.

== Objectives ==
The Baku Security Forum provides a venue for:

- Discussions on international and regional security issues
- Facilitating the exchange of views on contemporary challenges and threats
- Development of joint approaches to counterterrorism and global security risks
- Holding bilateral and multilateral meetings between participating delegations

It also aims to serve as a neutral platform where countries with differing political positions can address disputes, regional conflicts, and security-related concerns.

== History ==
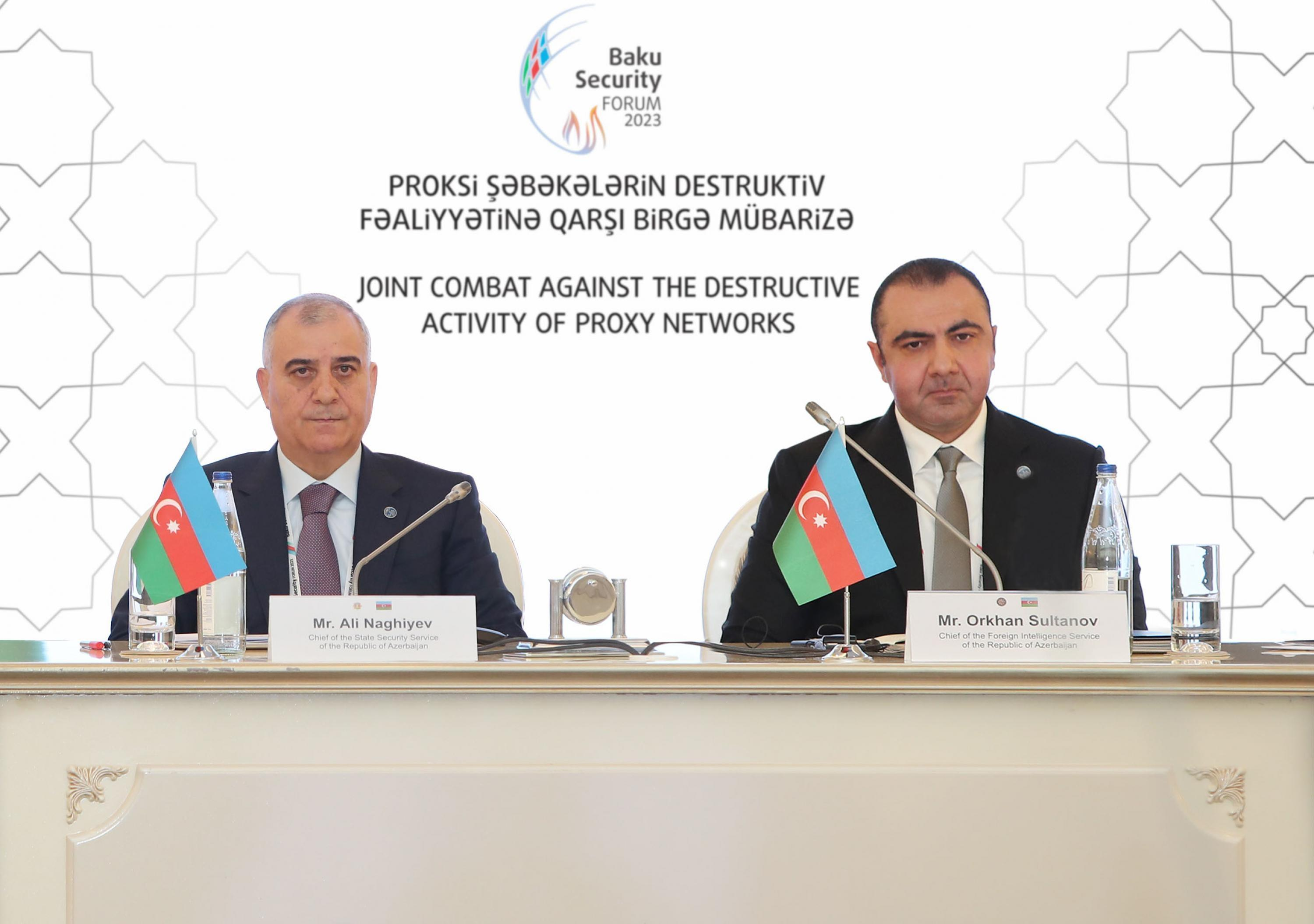
Ali Naghiyev, Head of the State Security Service, and Orkhan Sultanov, Head of the Foreign Intelligence Service of Azerbaijan, at the 1st Baku Security Forum

=== I Baku Security Forum (2023) ===
The first Baku Security Forum was held on 3 May 2023. Organized by the State Security Service of Azerbaijan, the event was dedicated to the 100th anniversary of Heydar Aliyev, the former President of Azerbaijan. It brought together senior officials from intelligence and security agencies across the world. The main theme of the forum was “Joint Combat Against the Destructive Activity of Proxy Networks.” At the forum, the importance of consolidating the efforts of countries in combating threats arising from the subversive activities of proxy groups, as well as the necessity of holding the event in the future, was emphasized.

=== II Baku Security Forum (2024) ===
The second forum took place on 15 September 2024 under the theme “Contemporary Challenges to the Security of Global Transportation Networks.” The event featured speeches by representatives of participating states, alongside bilateral and multilateral meetings. At the event held on the eve of COP29, with the emphasis on potential global-scale economic and environmental disasters that threats posed by terrorist and sabotage acts targeting transportation routes used for the delivery of energy resources could lead to, the necessity of further strengthening joint efforts and enhancing the effectiveness of collective action in this regard was highlighted.

=== III Baku Security Forum (2025) ===
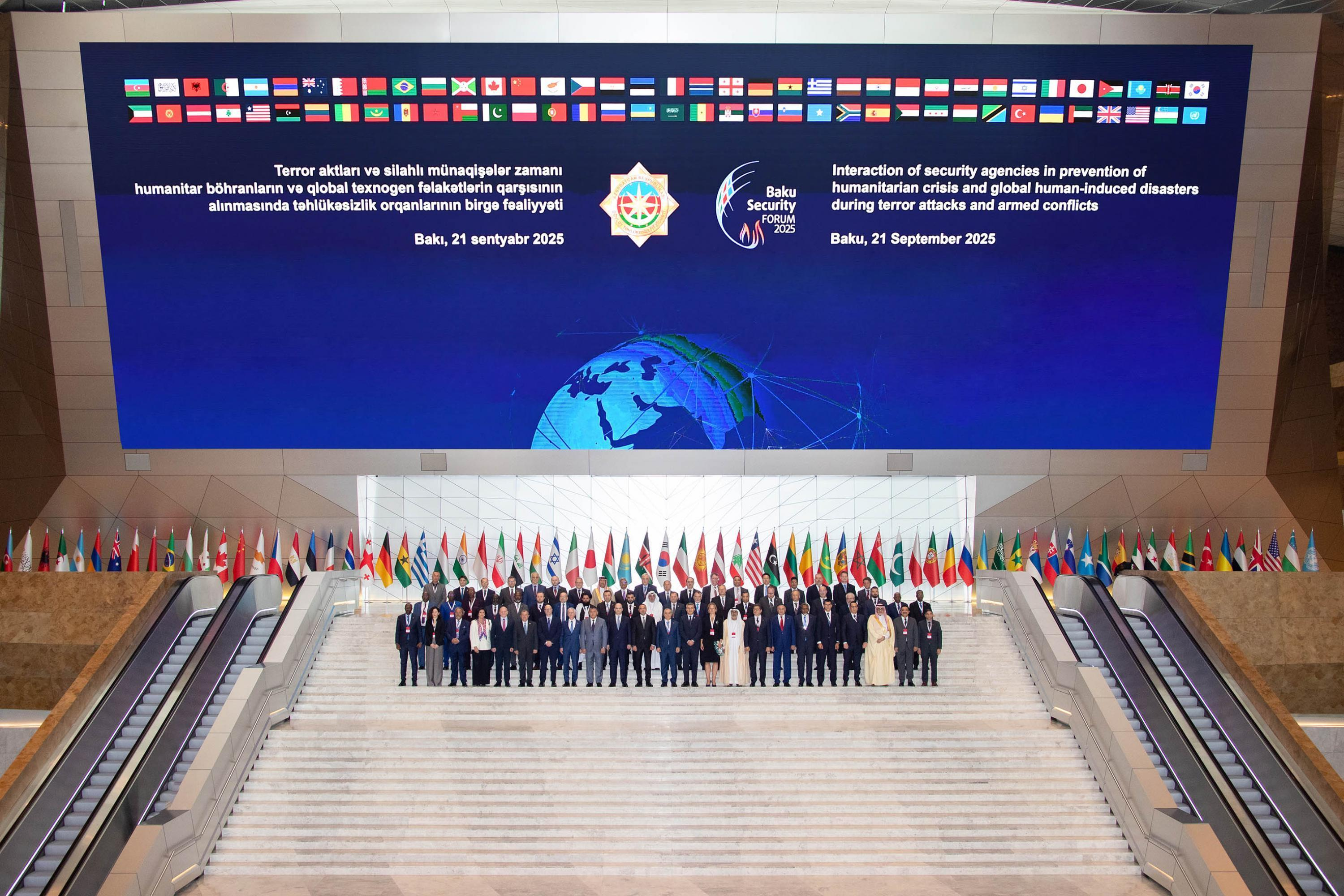
Participants of the 3rd Baku Security Forum

Azerbaijan also hosted the third forum on 21 September 2025, with the theme “The Role of Mutual Cooperation Among Security Agencies in Preventing Humanitarian Crises During Terrorist Attacks and Armed Conflicts, as well as Global Technogenic Disasters and Environmental Catastrophes.” Participants of this year’s Baku Security Forum expressed confidence that the event would make substantial contributions to the mobilization of joint efforts aimed at ensuring international and regional security, as well as to the advancement of operational diplomacy, and mutual interaction together with the development of bilateral and multilateral cooperation among intelligence and security agencies.

== See also ==
- Azerbaijan
- State Security Service
