= Ashurov =

Ashurov is a surname. Notable people with that surname include:

- Agha Ashurov (1880–1936), Azerbaijani statesman
- Aslan Ashurov (1853–1909), Azeri shipping and trading entrepreneur and politician
- Azizbek Ashurov, human-rights lawyer
- Djumshud Ashurov (1913–1980), Soviet composer
- Urunboi Ashurov (1903–1938), First Secretary of the Communist Party of Tajikstan
