= Terrorism in Azerbaijan =

The fight against terrorism in Azerbaijan is one of Azerbaijan's declared priorities. International organizations banned as terrorist include Al Qaeda, Al-Nusra Front, Jamaat, Hizb ut-Tahrir, Islamic International Brigade, ISIS, Jeyshullah, and PKK. According to the Global Terrorism Database, seven people have been killed and over 20 injured in terrorist attacks from 2000 to 2015.

== Banned organisations ==
The Azerbaijani government has designated 52 organisations as terrorist and banned them.

=== International organizations ===
International organisations the Azerbaijani government has designated as terrorist and banned include:

- Al Qaeda
- Al-Nusra Front
- Hizb ut-Tahrir
- Islamic International Brigade
- ISIS
- Jeyshullah
- PKK

=== Nationalist organisations ===
- Sadval (Lezgian)
- Grey Wolves (Turkey)

== Islamic radicalism ==
=== Wahhabists ===
Today Wahhabi congregation, particularly the radical part of Salafists, are considered one of the dangerous radical Islamic groups in Azerbaijan. Before the November 6, 2005 elections Rafik Aliyev, chairman of the Azerbaijani government's Committee for Work with Religious Formations, warned that the increased activity of "Wahhabis," poses a threat to political stability in Azerbaijan. In October, 2007 the Azerbaijani government reported it thwarted a Wahhabi radical Islamic group's plot to conduct a “large-scale, horrifying terror attack” against US and British diplomatic missions and government buildings. According to the Azerbaijani National Security Ministry, one suspect was killed and several others were detained in a weekend sweep in village outside the capital. The State Department closed US embassy in Baku for a period, while the UK embassy in Azerbaijan suspended services due to "local security concerns". The arrests came after security forces engaged in a search for more than a month, that finally led them to a safe house in Sumgayit, where the militants were arrested.

An Attack on Abu Bakr Mosque of Baku took place on August 17, 2008 when a man or men threw a grenade through a window of the Abu Bakr (Abu-Bekir) mosque, used both by Sunni and Wahhabi Muslims, during the evening prayer. Three people were killed and 13 injured. During the investigation, 26 persons were accused of Article 214 (terrorism), 279 (creation of an armed formations or groups, which are not provided by the legislation) and others of the Criminal Code of Azerbaijan Republic, and one person, the leader of “Forest brothers” radical group, was killed during a special operation.

=== Al-Qaeda ===
In 1998 after the attacks on the U.S. embassies in Dar-es-Salaam and Nairobi, as a result of the fax that was sent from Baku, the level of activity of Al-Qaeda in the country was discovered. Azerbaijan actively cooperated with the United States in counterterrorism operations and had success in reducing the presence and hampering the activities of international Islamic militant groups with ties to terrorist organizations seeking to move people, money, and material throughout the Caucasus. Following this members of the Al-Gama'a al-Islamiyya close to Al-Qaeda movement were arrested in Azerbaijan and extradited to Cairo. An jihadist operative associated with Musab al-Zarqawi, Abu Atiya, was arrested in Baku in August 2003.

Amiraslan Iskenderov and five co-defendants were found guilty of trying to start an Islamist army in 2005.

According to U.S. Department of State report on terrorism in Azerbaijan, "in April 2006, in a trial involving a group called al-Qaida Caucasus (separate from a group of the same name sentenced in 2005), 16 group members were sentenced to terms of up to life in prison. The group was convicted of the illegal purchase and bearing of firearms and for the July 2005 assassination of an officer of the Azerbaijani Ministry of Internal Affairs. The group consisted of citizens of Azerbaijan, Turkey, Russia and Yemen."

=== Jeyshullah ===
The Jeyshullah (soldiers of Allah) group was an extremist Salafi group, mainly active in Azerbaijan in the late 1990s, and reportedly responsible for several murders and attacks against the Hare Krishna temple and the Baku office of the European Bank for Reconstruction and Development. It is also thought to have planned to bomb the U.S. Embassy in Azerbaijan but was pre-empted by Azerbaijani law enforcement officials.

Jeyshullah was founded by Mubariz Aliyev, a renegade Internal Affairs Ministry officer, with the aim to spread Salafism in Azerbaijan by "getting rid of those who stood in their way, seizing of power in the country by force and creating an Islamic state". It also called on Azerbaijanis to fight foreign religious missionaries and non-Islamic religious groups and received special military and ideological training in Chechnya. Jeyshullah's leaders were alleged of terrorism and prisoned in 2000, Mubariz Aliev was sentenced to life imprisonment.

=== Tovba ===
Tovba (Repentance) Radical Islamic organization, that supported the usage of Arabic script in prevail of Latin in Azerbaijan in early-1990s, was expanded from Azerbaijan to Central Asia and founded its power structures in Ferghana Valley in 1991. According to Stephen Roth Institute, Tovba, as well as Hizb ut-Tahrir al-Islamiyya were among the organizations in Azerbaijan and in Central Asia that "reflect the anti Israel and anti Jewish attitudes of the parent organizations in the Middle East, which finance the dissemination of their propaganda."

=== Gülen movement ===
Influence of Turkey in shaping Islam in post-Soviet Azerbaijan was due to a combination of popular Islam and Turkic nationalism promoted by the Turkish religious Gülen movement, which also operates under the name of "Nur". In June 2014, it was announced Azerbaijan's parliament has shut down private 11 high schools, 13 university-exam preparation centres, as well as Qafqaz University, all of them which are run by influential preacher Fethullah Gulen.

== Terrorist Incidents in Azerbaijan ==
The International Crisis Group has determined, in the executive summary of the findings from its special report on religion in Azerbaijan, that: "Azerbaijan is a secular state with an overwhelmingly moderate (predominantly Shiite) Muslim population. Since the break-up of the Soviet Union and independence in 1991, independent Sunni and Shiite groups have emerged which refuse the spiritual authority of the official clergy. Some are political, but very few, if any, appear intent on employing violence to overthrow the state."

In recent history, the Azerbaijani security services have focused on the threat posed by radical and nationalistic Islamic militant organisations, such as those responsible for the 1994 Baku Metro bombings and the 2007 Baku terrorist plot.

In 2008 a mosque called "Abubakr" mosque was attacked by a terrorist who threw 2 hand grenades through the window during evening prayers, killing 2 and injuring 17. The attacker was identified to be a member of "Forest Brothers" islamist group also known as Derbent Jamaat.

In 2012 Azerbaijan prevented and arrested 22 Iranian Hezbollah terrorists for plotting an attack against Israeli and U.S. targets.

In 2016 Azerbaijan prevented terrorist attack to blow up Baku-Istanbul bus.

In 2016 Azerbaijan's State Security Service killed an armed terrorist.

In January 2026, Azerbaijani authorities announced the arrest of three men accused of planning a terrorist attack on a foreign embassy in Baku. The State Security Service said the suspects had conspired with Islamic State Khorasan Province (ISIS-K), obtained weapons, and were detained before carrying out the attack. While Azerbaijani authorities did not identify the target, some Israeli media outlets reported that the alleged plot was aimed at the Israeli embassy. The men were charged with preparing terrorism motivated by religious hostility, and the investigation was ongoing.

== Counter-terrorism ==
=== Domestic counter-terrorism ===
Azerbaijan continued to use counterterrorism legislation, first adopted in 1999, that governs the investigation and prosecution of individuals who have committed or plan to commit terrorist acts. The Ministry of National Security is primarily responsible for combating terrorism, although the Ministry of Internal Affairs also plays a role as the country's primary law enforcement entity. Both ministries demonstrated the ability to detect and deter terrorist activities.

=== International cooperation ===
The government of Azerbaijan has engaged in cooperation at the bilateral and multilateral level to gain support for its efforts to combat terrorism and ethnic separatism. This has increased following the September 11 attacks in the United States, which led to the global war on terror.

== See also ==
- 1990 Tbilisi–Agdam bus bombing
- 1994 Baku Metro bombings
- 2007 Baku terrorist plot
- Azerbaijan State Oil Academy shooting
- Ministry of National Security of Azerbaijan
