= Ramin Guluzade =

Azerbaijani politician

Ramin Guluzade Ramin Quluzadə
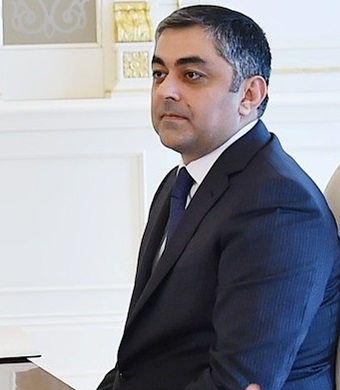

Head of the President's Administrative Services Department
- Incumbent
- Assumed office January 26, 2021
- President: Ilham Aliyev
- Preceded by: Ogtay Shahbazov

Minister of Communications & Information Technologies
- In office January 15, 2016 – January 25, 2021
- President: Ilham Aliyev
- Preceded by: Ali Abbasov
- Succeeded by: Rashad Nabiyev

Personal details
- Born: February 1, 1977 (age 49) Baku, Azerbaijan
- Education: Azerbaijan State Economic University

Ramin Namig oghlu Guluzade (Azerbaijani: Ramin Namiq oğlu Quluzadə) (born 1977 in Baku, Azerbaijan) is an Azerbaijani politician who serves as the Chief of Staff to the President of Azerbaijan since 2021. He has previously served as the Minister of Transport, Communications and High Technologies of the Republic of Azerbaijan from January 15, 2016 to January 26, 2021.

== Biography ==
Ramin Namiq oglu Guluzade was born in Baku city, Azerbaijan on February 1, 1977. After finishing school No.167 in Yasamal district, Baku city, in 1993, entered Azerbaijan State Economic Institute. In 1997, graduated from the institute, and in 1999 received master's degree from the said institute. Worked at Heydar Aliyev Foundation in 2005-2015. Awarded Tereggi (Progress) Medal in 2014, by order of the President of the Republic of Azerbaijan for his active participation in preserving and popularizing the nationwide leader Heydar Aliyev's heritage. Appointed First Deputy Minister of Communications and High Technologies by order of the President of the Republic of Azerbaijan dated November 25, 2015. He was appointed Minister of Communications and High Technologies of the Republic of Azerbaijan by order of President of the Republic of Azerbaijan dated January 15, 2016. He was relieved from his post on January 25, 2021. The next day, he was appointed the Head of the President's Administrative Services Department.
