= Ilgar Musayev =

Chief of the State Service of Special Communications and Information Security of the Republic of Azerbaijan

Personal details
- Awards: For military services medal

Military service
- Rank: Lieutenant general

İlqar Əli oğlu Musayev - (September 15, 1975, Baku) Lieutenant-General, State Service of Special Communications and Information Security of the Republic of Azerbaijan chief (from 2022),State Security Service Azerbaijan Assistant Chief(2017–2022).

== Biography ==
Ilgar Musayev was born on September 15, 1975, in Baku. He received his higher education at the Azerbaijan State Academy of Physical Education and Sport and the State Security Service Academy named after Heydar Aliyev.

It became operational in 1994.

Between 1994 and 2015, he worked in a responsible position in the field of Special State Protection Service of Azerbaijan.

Since 2015, he continued to hold responsible positions in the State Security Service of the Republic of Azerbaijan in accordance with the decree of the President of the Republic of Azerbaijan.

By the Decree of the President of the Republic of Azerbaijan dated March 27, 2017, Ilgar Musayev was given the High Military Rank of Major General.

By the Order of the President of the Republic of Azerbaijan dated May 11, 2017, he was appointed Deputy Head of the State Security Service of Azerbaijan.

By the Decree of the President of the Republic of Azerbaijan dated December 4, 2020, Ilgar Musayev was granted the high military rank of Lieutenant-General.

By the Decree of the President of the Republic of Azerbaijan dated July 15, 2022, he was appointed Head of the State Service of Special Communications and Information Security of the Republic of Azerbaijan.

== Awards ==
- Medal "For military services" by the Order of the President of the Republic of Azerbaijan No. 3001 dated August 21, 2008.
- Order of the President of the Republic of Azerbaijan No. 1062 dated March 27, 2019, 3rd degree "For Service to the Fatherland " order.
- Order of the President of the Republic of Azerbaijan No. 318 dated March 17, 2022, 2nd degree "For Service to the Fatherland" Order.
