= Amirjanov =

Amirjanov (Azerbaijani: Əmircanov) is an Azerbaijani surname.

People bearing this surname include:

- Abdulali bey Amirjanov - Minister of Finance and State Controller of Azerbaijan Democratic Republic
- Ruslan Amirjanov - Azerbaijani professional footballer playing for Neftchi Baku
