= Innovation Agency (Azerbaijan) =

Innovation and Digital Development Agency
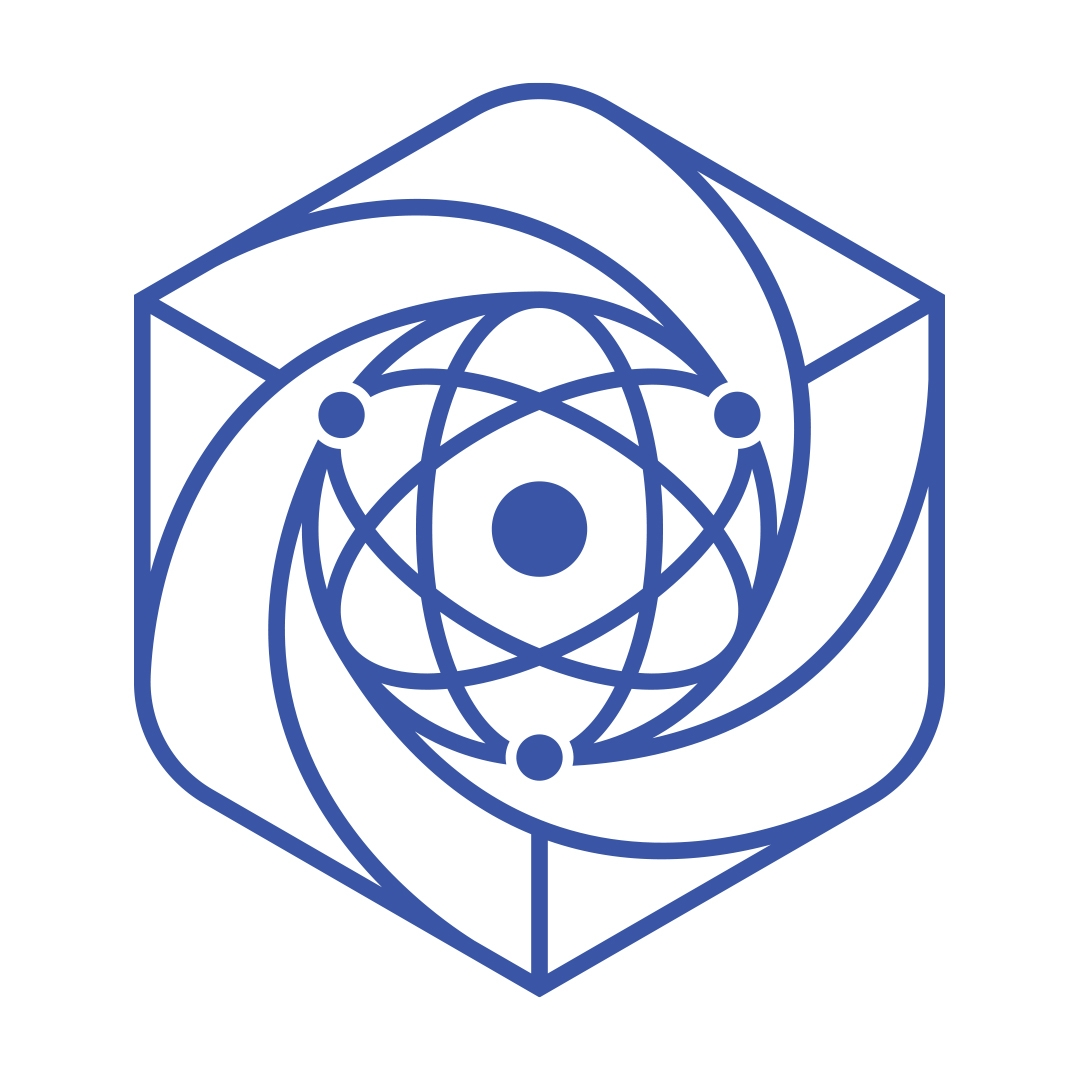

Agency overview
- Formed: October 11, 2021
- Headquarters: 89 Ataturk Avenue Baku, Azerbaijan / AZ1069
- Agency executive: Farid Osmanov
- Website: https://idda.az/

The Innovation and Digital Development Agency (Azerbaijani: İnnovasiya və Rəqəmsal İnkişaf Agentliyi) is a state agency under Ministry of Digital Development and Transportation of Azerbaijan. The agency supports local businesses by facilitating the acquisition and transfer of modern technologies, backing innovation-driven research, and funding startups through grants, concessional loans, and venture capital.

On November 6, 2018, based on a decree by the President of Azerbaijan, Ilham Aliyev, the Innovations Agency was established under the Ministry of Transport, Communications, and High Technologies of Azerbaijan.

On October 11, 2021, based on a presidential decree, the Innovation and Digital Development Agency was established through the merger and reorganization of the "National Nuclear Center" Closed Joint-stock company, the Innovations Agency, and the Research Center for High Technologies, all of which were under the Ministry of Transport, Communications, and High Technologies of Azerbaijan.

== Board of directors ==
Under the order of the President of the Republic of Azerbaijan from 5 August, 2019, Tural Kerimli had been appointed as a chairman of Innovation Agency.

In 2023, Inara Valiyeva was appointed as the head of the agency. She had previously served in this position on a temporary basis.

On January 16, 2025, Farid Osmanov was appointed as the head of the agency.

== Criticisms ==
In 2021, the Innovation and Digital Development Agency incurred a loss of 4.163 million manats, and in 2022, a loss of 4.626 million manats. The organization ended 2023 with a loss of 7.652 million manats, increasing its accumulated loss by 45.9% to reach 24.309 million manats.

The agency has also been criticized for not paying the companies it collaborated with under the training program for months, and for delaying payments without any reason.

According to some claims, within the framework of the Technest project, courses were organized in various locations across the city, including unsuitable venues, to serve the personal interests of certain employees of the agency. It is reported that some of these courses were merely formal and did not involve actual teaching activities. Additionally, it has been claimed that some individuals joined the project through non-transparent means and that resources were used inefficiently.

== See also ==
- Ministry of Transport, Communications and High Technologies (Azerbaijan)
- State Fund for Development of IT
