= State Security Service Academy =

Azerbaijani military academy

Heydar Aliyev State Security Service Academy
- Dövlət Təhlükəsizliyi Xidmətinin Heydər Əliyev adına Akademiyası
- Type: Military academy
- Established: 1 December 1998
- Parent institution: State Security Service of Azerbaijan
- Location: Baku, Azerbaijan

The Heydar Aliyev State Security Service Academy of Azerbaijan (Azerbaijani: Dövlət Təhlükəsizliyi Xidmətinin Heydər Əliyev adına Akademiyası) is a higher military educational institution that provides professional training of personnel of the State Security Service and the Foreign Intelligence Service, training of highly qualified specialists, as well as border controllers and border guard officers for the State Border Service.

== History ==
The Academy was established by decree of the President of Azerbaijan Heydar Aliyev on December 1, 1998.

The Academy was named after Heydar Aliyev by decree of the President of Azerbaijan Ilham Aliyev dated December 20, 2005. It used to operate under the Ministry of National Security of Azerbaijan, and since December 2015, it has been operating under the State Security Service.

The main goal of the institution is to train highly qualified personnel for national security agencies. Practical and theoretical management of the scientific and educational activities of the Academy is carried out by the Scientific Council.

== Faculties ==
- Faculty of Border Troops
- Faculty of Training of Operational Workers
- Faculty of Retraining and Advanced Training.

== See also ==
- State Security Service of the Republic of Azerbaijan
