= Eldar Mahmudov =

Azerbaijani politician (b. 1956)

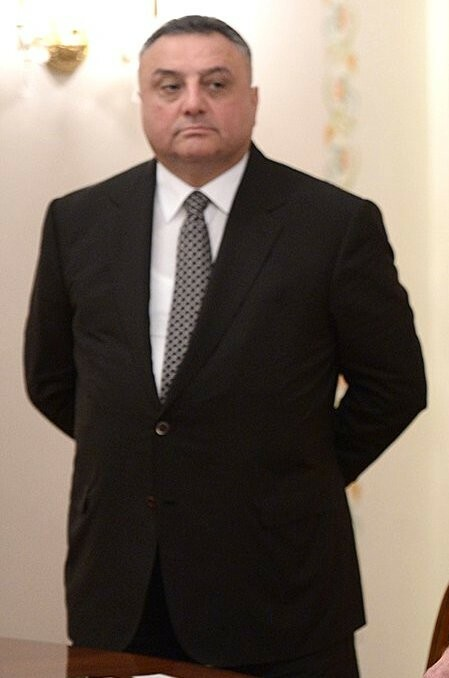

Minister of National Security of Azerbaijan Republic
- In office 24 July 2004 – 17 October 2015
- President: Ilham Aliyev
- Preceded by: Namig Abbasov

Personal details
- Born: January 1, 1956 (age 70) Baku, Azerbaijan SSR, USSR
- Spouse: Married
- Children: 3

Military service
- Rank: Colonel General

Eldar Mahmudov Ahmad oglu (Azerbaijani: Eldar Mahmudov Əhməd oğlu) is an Azerbaijani politician formerly serving as the Minister of National Security of Azerbaijan Republic.

== Early life ==
Mahmudov was born in Baku in 1956 to the family of a scientist. His father's family is originally from the village of Shahtakhti in the Sharur region of the Nakhchivan Autonomous Republic. He graduated from the Bunyadzadeh Institute of Economy in 1978 (B.A. in Finance and Credit) and Baku State University in 1993 (B.A. in Law). He holds the military rank of Lieutenant General as of March 16, 2005 and formerly served in the USSR Armed Forces.

== Career ==
In 1980-2004 Mahmudov served in internal affairs agencies, firstly of the Azerbaijan Soviet Socialist Republic (to 1991) and thereafter the Ministry of Internal Affairs of Azerbaijan Republic. His duties included criminal investigation and preventing organized crime. In 1992, Mahmudov was appointed Head of the Drugs Enforcement Department of the Ministry of Internal Affairs (Azerbaijan). In 1993-2003, Mahmudov was Chief of the Economic Crimes Department and the Operative Economic Coordination Bureau. In early 2004, he was appointed Head of the Main Directorate for Combatting Illicit Drug Trafficking.

Mahmudov frequently represented Azerbaijan in the work of several international organisations and at different conferences and seminars dedicated to the issues of terrorism, corruption, human trafficking, and the illegal drugs trade held in different countries around the world. He was directly involved in the drafting of numerous international legal instruments, including the United Nations Convention against Corruption. On July 24, 2004 he was appointed the Minister of National Security by President Ilham Aliyev and awarded the military rank of Major General.

With the arrival of Mahmudov, personnel and structural reforms were introduced in the fight against terrorism and other serious crimes such as murder, kidnapping, drug trafficking and cyber crime.

By the Order of the President of Azerbaijan dated March 16, 2005, he was awarded the military rank of Lieutenant General and by a subsequent Order dated March 27, he was awarded the highest military rank of Colonel General. On October 17, 2015 he was relieved of his post as Minister of National Security of the Republic of Azerbaijan by decree of President Ilham Aliyev.

== Ministry of National Security Successes Under Eldar Mahmudov ==
=== Attempt to Assassinate President Ilham Aliyev and Eurovision 2012 Atrocity Prevented ===
In May 2012 in a major widespread operation across Azerbaijan, an attempt on the life of President Aliev was prevented, as was a planned terrorist atrocity at the Eurovision Song Contest 2012 in Baku.

The thwarted attempt on the life of President Aliyev was in the north-western region of Azerbaijan, where Ministry of National Security forces took decisive action to neutralise the threat. A transnational terrorist group had planned a coordinated attack designed to kill and maim the maximum number of victims, targeting landmark locations aimed at causing widespread casualties.

The terrorists were planning to target prestigious hotels, religious centres and places of pilgrimage and other sites likely to result in maximum casualties. Law enforcement officers and administrative centres throughout Azerbaijan were also to be targeted by the well prepared and resourced terrorist group.

Acting upon intelligence, the Ministry of National Security, headed by Eldar Mahmudov, conducted special large-scale operations in a number of Azerbaijan cities including Baku, Ganja and Sugayit, as well as other cities that were under threat of terrorist attack. The terrorists had specifically targeted the Eurovision 2012 contest in Baku, hoping to commit an international atrocity that would attract worldwide attention. As a result of the anti-terrorism operation, a notorious leader of the organised group, Vugar Padarov, was killed, along with a number of other terrorists.

Prestigious hotels such as the Hilton Baku and the JW Marriot Hotel Absheron were targets of the terrorist group, as was the Baku Crystal Hall which was the venue for the Eurovision 2012 contest. The terrorists had planted explosive devices in cars outside various hotels and the Eurovision 2012 venue, but the anti-terrorism measures adopted by the Ministry of National Security foiled the attempt to cause widespread casualties. A number of terrorists were killed by Ministry of National Security forces, with multiple arrests being made and convictions secured.

==== Operation Black Belt ====
In March 2005 Mahmudov implemented Operation Black Belt to rescue Zamira Hajiyeva, the wife of the Chairman of the International Bank of Azerbaijan, Jahangir Hajiyev, who had been kidnapped by a criminal gang in February 2005. However, the gang’s movements were already being monitored by the Azerbaijan Ministry of National Security.

The operation against the organised crime group that had engaged in kidnapping, murder and other serious crimes since 1996 was a success. During the investigation more than 50 crimes were uncovered including murder, kidnapping and other serious crimes. The gang included very senior police officers, and they were led by a senior operative of the Main Directorate of Criminal Intelligence of the Ministry of Internal Affairs, Lieutenant Colonel Haji Mammadov.

The gang had kidnapped at least a dozen relatives of well-known businessmen in Azerbaijan in order to obtain ransom over a nine-year period. Simultaneously 13 other members of the kidnapping group were arrested across Azerbaijan, including Russian Federation and Chechnyan citizens.

==== Operation "Qartal" ====
Operation Qartal was a large anti-terrorist operation in the northern territories of Azerbaijan mounted by the Ministry of National Security of the Republic of Azerbaijan, led by Eldar Mahmudov. Its aim was to confront and neutralise the leaders of the Forest Brothers gang, a notorious terrorist group based in the Qusar region of Azerbaijan. On August 25, 2008, the gang was located in a forest between the villages of Avaran and Khurel in the Qusar region. Special forces were ordered to engage with the terrorists who had opened fire using machine guns and grenades. The militants fled the scene and a full pursuit was mounted using combat helicopters and armoured vehicles. Illegally stored weapons and literature "propagandizing jihad and terrorism" were seized from members of the group.

A special plan was drawn up and an anti-terrorist operation was executed by the special forces of the Gartal unit of the Ministry of National Security. On September 6, 2008, the terrorists were surrounded in a house on the outskirts of the city of Gusar. Three gunmen were killed in a skirmish with special forces, with the terrorist’s leader Ilgar Mollachiev managing to escape and flee the scene. On September 7, 2008, he was located and killed in Dagestan by forces of the Ministry of Internal Affairs.

==== War on Drugs ====
In 2007 the Ministry of National Security, under Eldar Mahmudov, intensified its efforts to combat the smuggling of illegal drugs into the country. A spate of initiatives clamped down on organised crime moving drugs into Azerbaijan from Iran, Afghanistan and other countries. Confiscations and high profile arrests were made. In April 2007 it was reported that an organised crime group had been intercepted smuggling drugs along the Iran-Azerbaijan-Russia-Japan route and 68 kg of narcotics had been seized.

In June 2007 it was announced that the Ministry of National Security had prevented over 250 kg of narcotics from being distributed by criminal gangs, through intelligence led operations. In July an organised drug smuggling group was intercepted in a joint operation between the Ministry of National Security and the Azerbaijan State Border Service. A significant amount of heroin and hashish were seized and prevented from being trafficked. By September 2007 a number of drug smuggling groups had been targeted and intercepted, with over 150 kg of hard drugs seized by the Ministry of National Security. During Eldar Mahmudov’s tenure as Minister of National Security of the Republic of Azerbaijan, over a ton of the most serious drugs were intercepted every year.

==== Counter Terrorism ====
During Eldar Mahmudov’s tenure, the Ministry of National Security conducted numerous successful counter terrorism operations. Foreign terrorist groups, including Al Qaeda cells, were neutralised and their leaders arrested or eliminated:

- In 2006 a terrorist group originating from Armenia was intercepted and its plans to attack the Baku-Tbilisi-Ceyhan oil pipeline thwarted.
- In 2007 terrorist attacks and sabotage in Baku were prevented. Later that year, in November, a radical group with Al Qaeda links was neutralised. It was found to be harbouring a senior Al Qaeda fugitive called Abu Jafar, with plans to smuggle him out of Azerbaijan. In July 2008, the Prosecutor demanded lengthy jail terms for the group and Abu Jafar, who was jailed for fourteen years.
- In late 2009 the Ministry of National Security foiled a plot by an organised group to smuggle a large quantity of arms into the country from Georgia, to organise terrorist activity in Azerbaijan.
- The Ministry of National Security also combatted cyber terrorism, and in May 2011 successfully identified Azerbaijani-language websites that were based in foreign countries. Working closely with the Ministry of Communications and Information Technologies, the websites, which contained information on how to spread national and religious confrontation, methods on how to recruit terrorists and instructions on how to make improvised explosive devices, were blocked.
- A major terrorist act, the planned assassination of a public figure, was prevented in January 2012 by the Ministry of National Security, when an organised group funded and equipped by Iran, was apprehended and firearms, explosives and equipment were seized.
- In March 2012, a special Ministry of National Security operation led to 22 arrests on charges of espionage activities against Azerbaijan, acting on the orders of Iran’s Islamic Revolutionary Guard.

In particular, a large number of agents operating in the territory of Azerbaijan, recruited by the special services of foreign states, were exposed.

== Awards ==
Mahmudov has been awarded the Azerbaijani Flag Order for preservation of social order, keeping stability intact and fight against criminal activity.

In 1989 he was awarded the Medal For Distinction in the Protection of Public Order - USSR and the Medal For Impeccable Service - USSR.

== Personal life ==
Mahmudov is married, with three children. According to the Ashurov-Malikov family organisation, Mahmudov's wife, Tamira Mahmudova, is descended from prominent early twentieth century Azeri businessman and politician, Aslan Ashurov (whose son was a founder of the first independent Azerbaijan, Agha Ashurov).
