= Caspian Telecom =

Azerbaijan-based telecommunications company

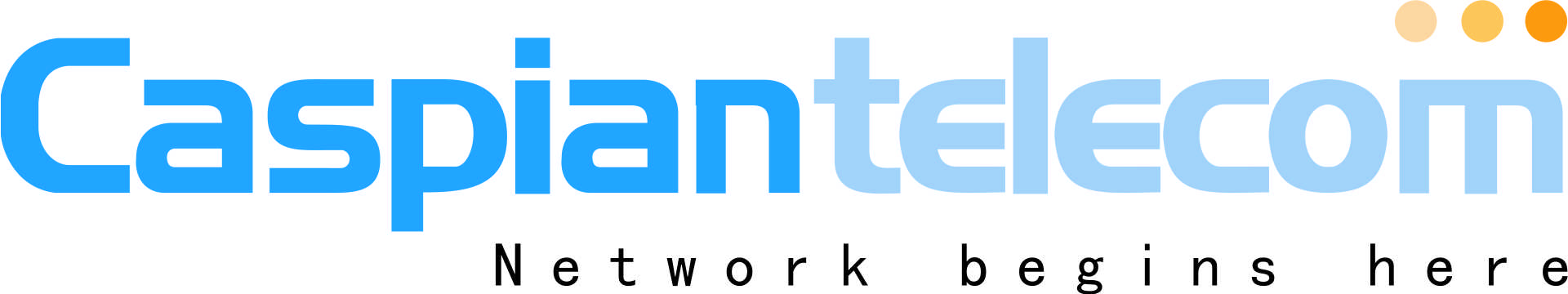
- Company type: Limited liability company
- Headquarters: Baku, Azerbaijan
- Area served: Telecommunications
- Products: Network services
- Website: castel.az

Caspian Telecom LLC is an Azerbaijan-based telecommunications company founded in 1997. The company provides a wide range of telecommunication services (any scale private networks, broadband, data, SWIFT, etc.) using its fiber-optic infrastructure, as well as acting as a system integrator for a wide range of telecom routing. Caspian Telecom also offers cable television and internet provider services under brand names “Ailə TV” and “Ailə NET”.

== Company overview ==
The company is located at 251A, Dilara Aliyeva Street, AZ1010 Baku, Azerbaijan.

== Specialization ==
CISCO, Broadband, SWIFT, LAN, WAN, Security, Fiber Optics, Routing Switching

== See also ==
- Telecommunications in Azerbaijan
- Ministry of Communications and Information Technologies (Azerbaijan)
- List of Azerbaijani companies
