= Aslan Ashurov =

Azeri politician (1853–1909)

Hajji Aslan Ashurov (b. c.1853 – c.1909) was an Azeri shipping and trading entrepreneur and politician, based in Baku. In 1903, he received a hereditary honour from Tsar Nicholas II. Aslan Ashurov was the father of Azeri politician, Agha Ashurov. His descendants today include the wife and children of Azeri politician and former National Security minister, Eldar Mahmudov.

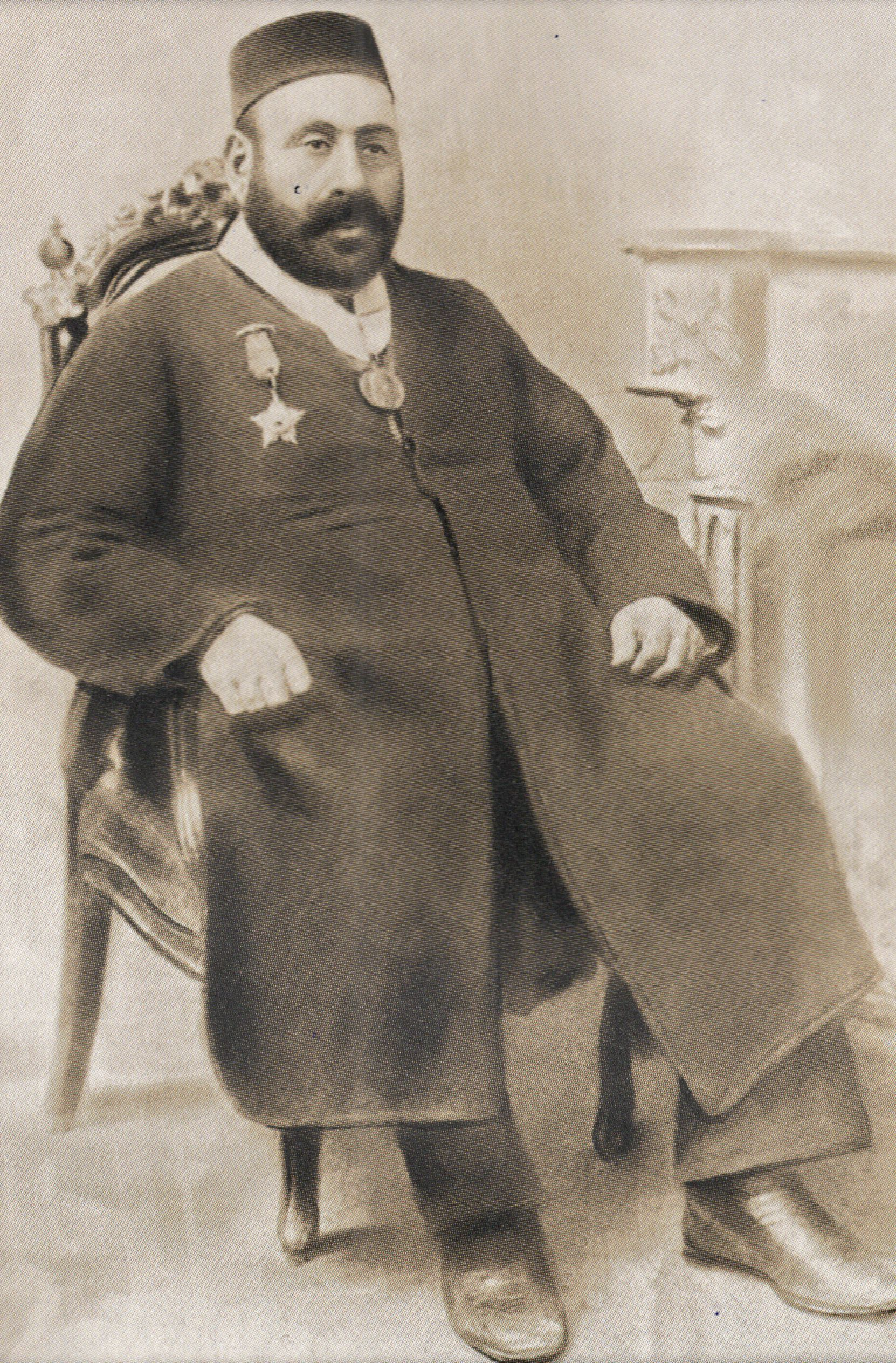

By 1898, the Ashurov family had become major business figures in Baku: the Ashurov Brothers Trading Company is recorded as owning 5 steamships, 3 barques (three masted sailing ships); 5 additional sailing ships, and 8 barges. In addition, the family also owned the Ashurov & Company Power Station business. Aslan Ashurov also took advantage of the developing Azeri oil industry to advance his shipping and trading interests across the Russian empire and beyond. Aslan Ashurov built one of the largest private houses in Baku.

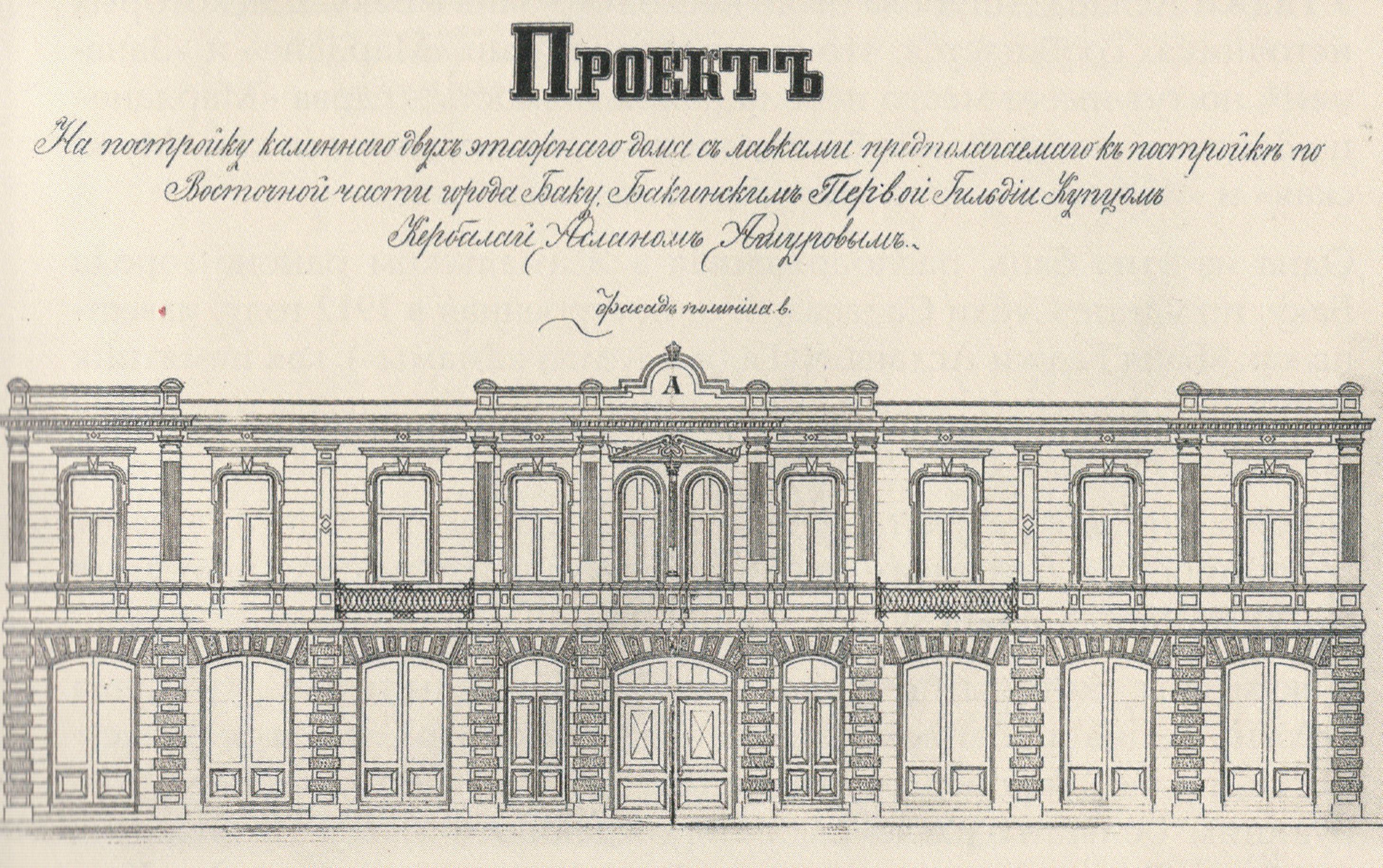

In 1903, Russian Tsar, Nicholas II, granted Ashurov the title of Honoured Citizen of the Russian Empire, which was a new, hereditary social rank in the Russian empire created by Tsar Nicholas I in 1830. It was awarded to successful members of the non-noble, urban wealthy.

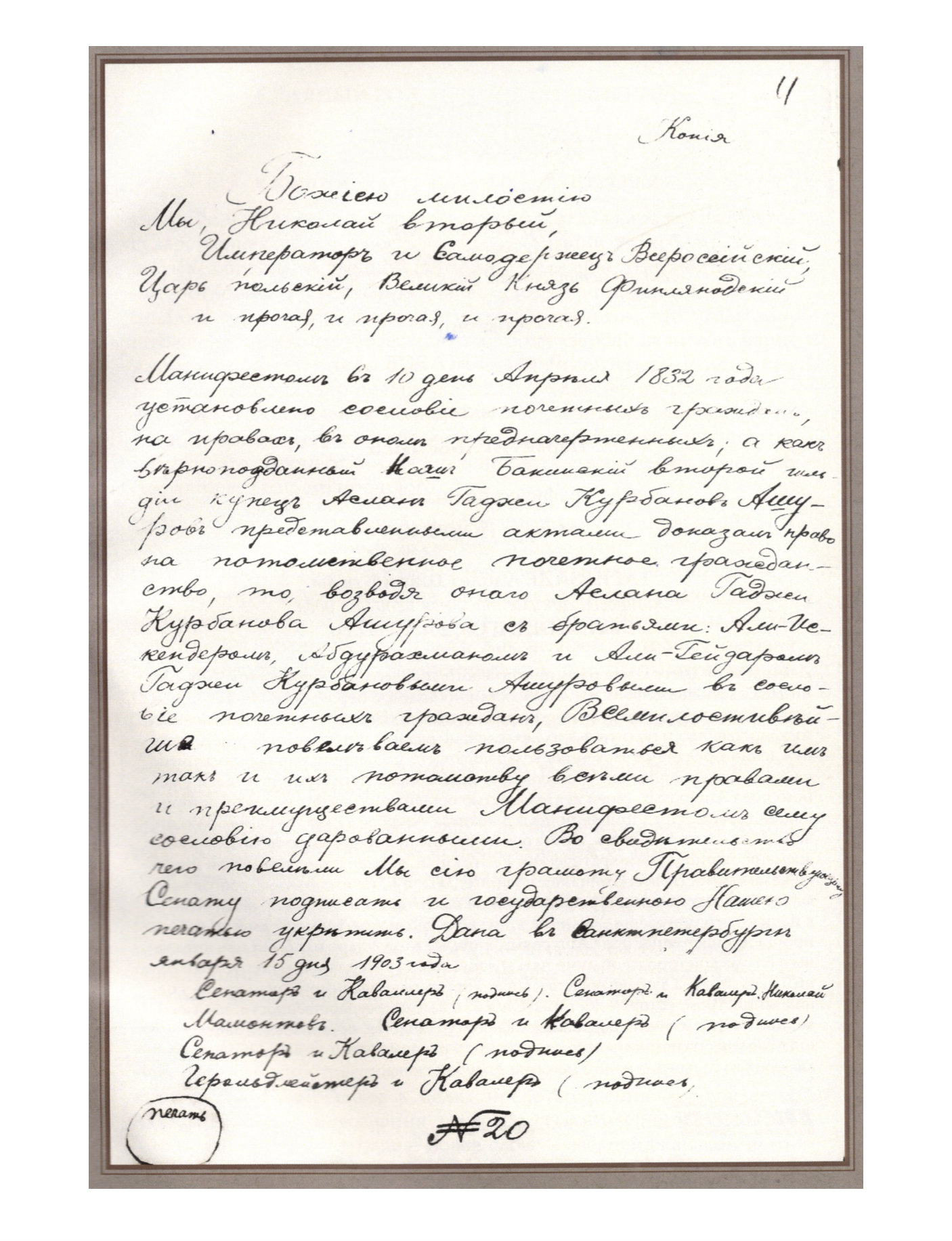

Aslan Ashurov was first elected to the Baku city Duma in 1881; and re-elected in 1882; 1886; 1894; 1897; and 1902, when he was elected a member of the Pricing Committee. In the 1904 Baku city Duma election, three members of the Ashurov family were simultaneously elected to the Duma: Hajji Aslan; his brother, Ali Iskander Ashurov and cousin, Hacibaba Jabbar oglu Ashurov, Aslan Ashurov was elected for the last time in 1907, again sitting on the Pricing Committee, before his death in 1909.

The First Russian Revolution of 1905 saw ethic conflicts in the Caucasus, and numerous terrorist actions in Baku and Duma proceedings show that Aslan Ashurov was one of the key figures in the Baku city Duma to discuss the crisis. He survived an assassination attempt, in the streets of Baku, near his home.
