= Ali Abbasov =

Azerbaijani government minister

Ali Abbasov Əli Abbasov
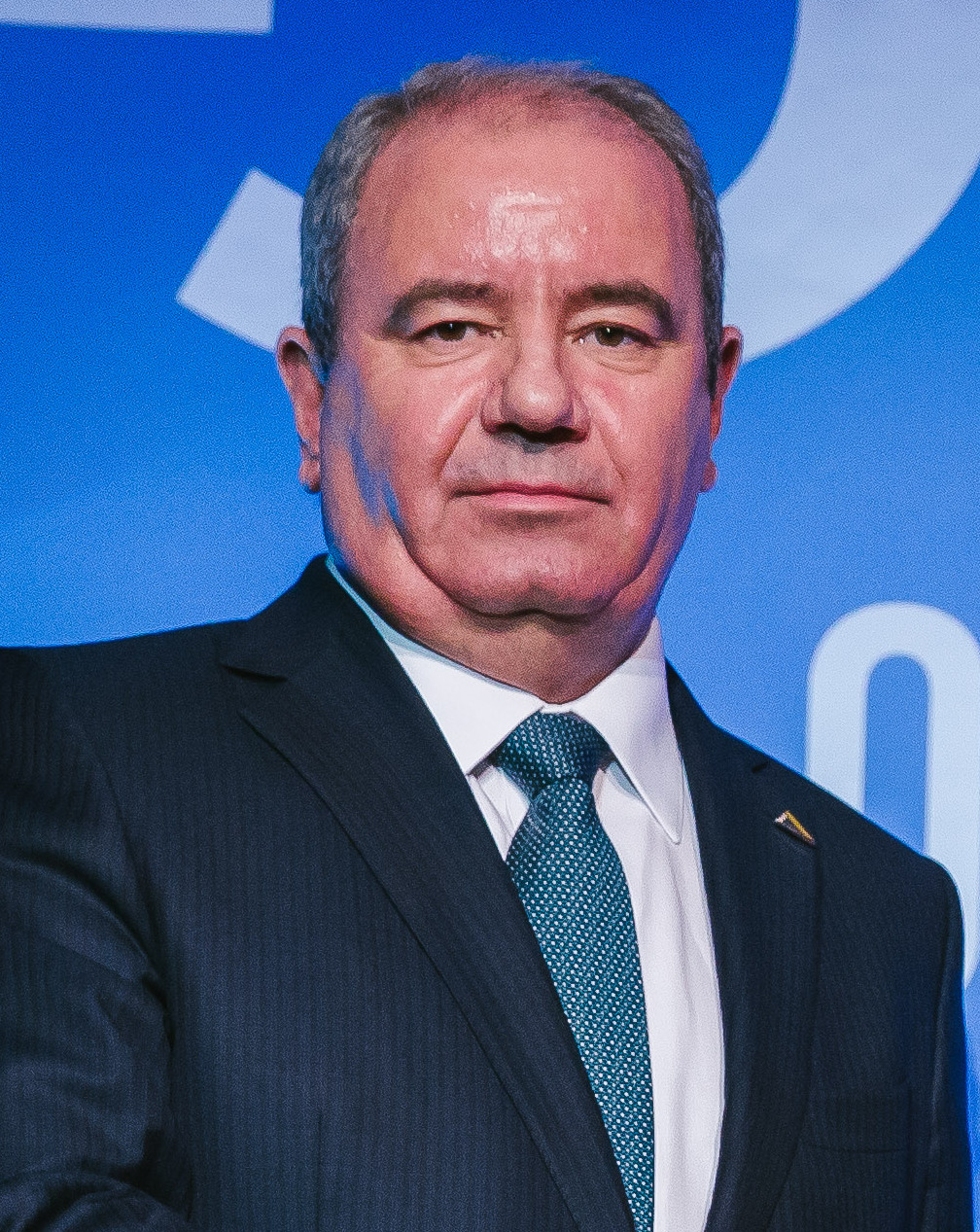

Minister of Communications & Information Technologies
- In office 20 February 2004 – 12 November 2015
- President: Ilham Aliyev

Personal details
- Born: January 1, 1953 (age 73) Nakhchivan, Azerbaijan

Ali Abbasov Mammad oglu (Azerbaijani: Əli Abbasov Məmməd oğlu) (born 1953 in Azerbaijan) was the Minister of Communications and Information Technologies of the Republic of Azerbaijan between 2004 and 2015.

== General information ==
Ali Mammad oglu Abbasov was born on January 1, 1953, in Nakhchivan city of the Republic of Azerbaijan. In 1976, he graduated from the department of “Automatics and Telemechanics” of the Moscow Power Engineering Institute and continued his graduate education in the Ukrainian Academy of Sciences. In 1981, he defended a thesis in the field of microelectronics and obtained PhD degree. In 1994, he defended his thesis entitled “Information processing and systems management” and was awarded with doctor of technical sciences academic degree. Abbasov A.M. is a full-time professor since 1996 and is a full member of the Azerbaijan National Academy of Sciences since 2001.

He is married and has two children.

== Career in science ==
During 1982–1992, Abbasov A.M. had worked at different positions in Azerbaijan National Academy of Sciences and had been in charge of scientific research works on development and application of computer and telecommunication networks. In 1992, he was appointed as a director of the Scientific Center of Information and Telecommunications of Azerbaijan National Academy of Sciences (present Institute of Information Technology) and had worked at this position till 2000. During this period he worked at positions such as the managing executive and the head of “Republic’s Automated Management Systems” (RAMS-Azerbaijan) project and of special designated computer and information systems at the national level. He headed the creation process of Internet infrastructure in Azerbaijan. Ali Abbasov was country coordinator of EARN and INTERNET networks, Azerbaijan coordinator in the NATO Scientific Committee in the field of information technologies, UNESCO expert for information and telecommunication and also represented the Republic of Azerbaijan in Trans-European Research and Education Networking Association (TERENA).

Abbasov has served as rector of the Azerbaijan State Economic University from 2000 to 2004.

He led prime projects such as “Development of Science and Education INTERNET network”, “Establishment of distant education system in the Republic (of Azerbaijan)”, “Virtual Silk Way”, “Special talents group”, etc. during this tenure. He is an author of numerous projects on implementation of fundamental changes on the improvement of education reforms and curriculum quality in the Azerbaijan State Economic University. He is also the president of the Azerbaijan Research and Educational Networking Association (AZRENA).

== Political career ==
Abbasov was an MP in the National Assembly of Azerbaijan (Milli Majlis) and member of the Parliamentary Assembly to the Council of Europe (PACE) from 2001 to 2004. He is an author of comprehensive report made in PACE on the subject of “Protection of cultural heritage in the South Caucasus Region”.

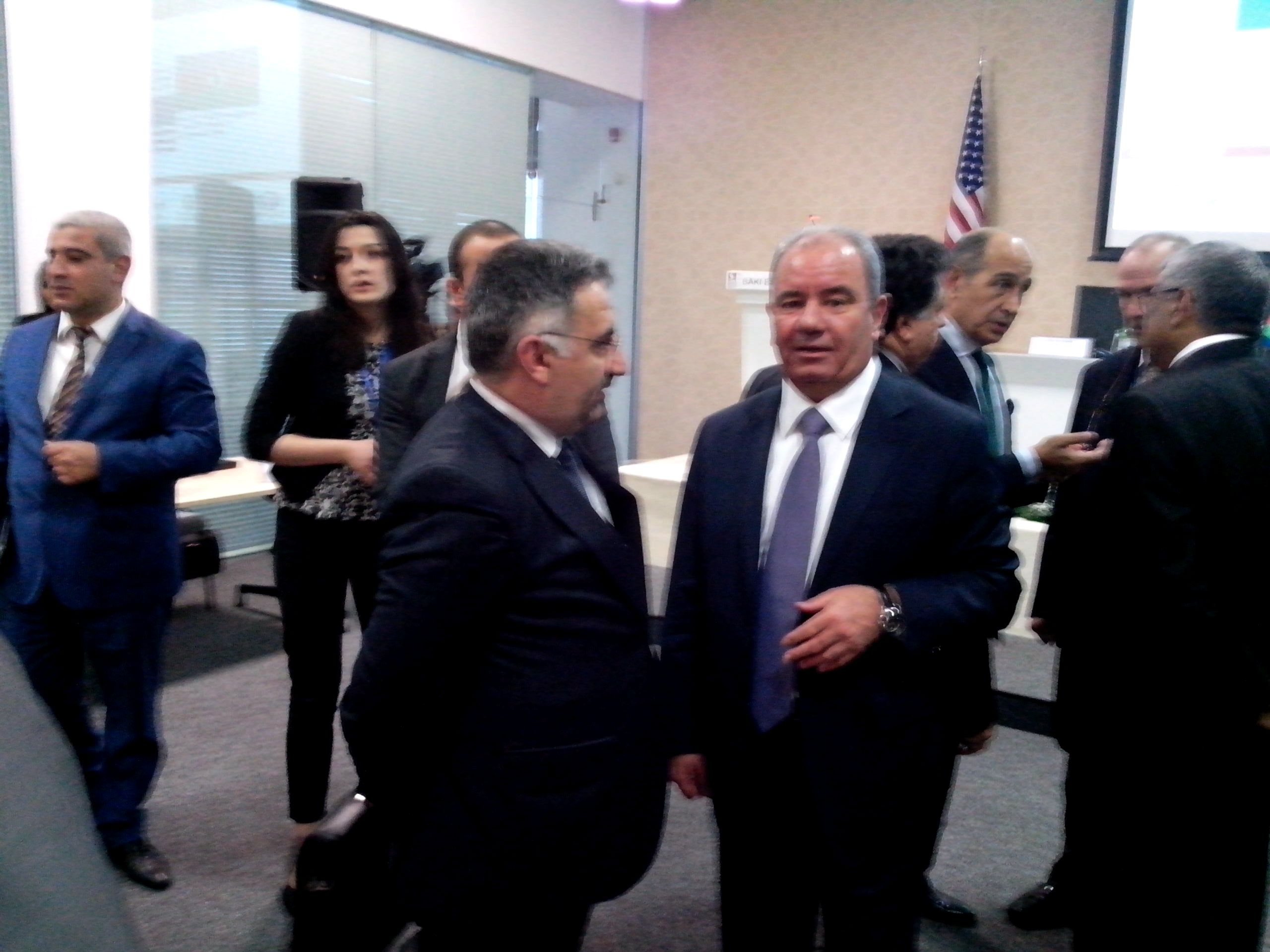
Azerbaijan-U.S. ICT Forum, December 3, 2013

In 2004, A. Abbasov was appointed as the Minister of Communications and Information Technologies of the Republic of Azerbaijan. He played a special role in accelerating Azerbaijan's transition process into information society; creation of the digital economy; implementation of new technologies and e-government solutions; development of broadband network services and human resources for ICT in the country. Abbasov heads national and regional projects such as “Trans-Eurasian Super Information Highway” (TASIM), “Regional Innovation Zone”, “Azerspace” - the first national satellite operator, etc. He is a full member of Azerbaijan National Academy of Sciences, the International Informatization Academy and International Telecommunication Academy, member of Broadband Commission for Digital Development under Secretary General of UN, Institute of Electrical and Electronics Engineers (IEEE).

On December 27, 2012, the President of Republic of Azerbaijan, H.E. Ilham Aliyev issued an order on rewarding of the Minister of Communications and Information Technologies Ali Abbasov with the Shohrat Order (Glory Order), for his contribution in development of information-communication technologies in the country.

== Scientific and academic activity ==
Topological methods for increasing density of large and very large scale integrations have been given and optimal allocations of elements on crystal have been settled. Optimal issues coordinating application process with functional-topological structure for control systems in computer networks have been solved. Settlement methods of sustainability in free topological computer networks, synthesis of hierarchical control system in such networks, methods of simulation models for distributed information systems and integral issues in distributed databases have been worked out.

Theoretical and practical foundations of distributed intellectual systems have been proposed. Fuzzy relation structured distributed knowledge bases, adoption of orders over them and expert systems have been established, adaptive methods in fuzzy structured knowledge bases and mathematical model of ideal knowledge base has been worked out.

Human – machine interface model has been prepared. New approach for analyzing and processing large scale information has been proposed.

Abbasov is a head of the “Information technologies in the world economy” Department at the Azerbaijan State Economic University. He delivers lectures on digital economics. He is an author and co-author of more than 180 scientific publications and 18 scientific monographs and books. He prepared 14 PhD (s) on technical science and 8 Doctor(s) of Technical Sciences. Native language is Azeri and he speaks English and Russian as well.
