= Second cabinet of the Azerbaijan Democratic Republic =

The second cabinet of the Azerbaijan Democratic Republic governed the Azerbaijan Democratic Republic (ADR) between June 17, 1918 and December 7, 1918. It was formed after the first cabinet of the Azerbaijan Democratic Republic dissolved and was led by Prime Minister of Azerbaijan Fatali Khan Khoyski with the following composition:

State Agency	Minister	Period	Party
Prime Minister	Fatali Khan Khoyski	May 28, 1918 – April 14, 1919	Independent
Minister of Foreign Affairs	Mammad Hasan Hajinski	May 28, 1918 – October 6, 1918	Musavat
Minister of Education and Religious Affairs	Nasib Yusifbeyli	June 17, 1918 – March 4, 1919	Musavat
Minister of Internal Affairs	Behbud Khan Javanshir	June 17, 1918 – December 26, 1918	Independent
acting Minister of Defense; Envoy to Karabakh and Zangezur	Khosrov bey Sultanov	June 17, 1918 – January 15, 1919	Musavat
Minister of Healthcare	Khudadat Rafibayov	June 17, 1918 – April 28, 1920	Musavat
Minister of Transportation, Postal Service and Telegraph (later just Minister of Transportation)	Khudadat bey Malik-Aslanov	May 28, 1918 – April 28, 1918	Muslim Socialist Bloc
Minister of Industry and Trade	Agha Ashurov	June 17, 1918 – October 6, 1918	Musavat
Minister of Postal Service and Telegraph	Agha Ashurov	October 6, 1918 – December 26, 1918	Musavat
Minister of Finance	Abdulali bey Amirjanov	June 17, 1918 - October 6, 1918	Independent
State Controller	Abdulali bey Amirjanov	October 6, 1918 – December 7, 1918	Independent
Special Minister in care of Social Security and Refugee Affairs	Musa bey Rafiyev	June 17, 1918 – October, 1918	Musavat
Minister of Social Security and Religious Affairs	Musa bey Rafiyev	October, 1918 - December 7, 1918	Musavat

On October 6, 1918, when the government of the Azerbaijan Democratic Republic moved to Baku, it conducted a few administrative reforms. The Ministry of Transportation, Postal Service and Telegraph was split into the Ministry of Transportation and the Ministry of Postal Service and Telegraph. and a new Ministry of Social Security and Religious Affairs was established.

Among notable contributions of the second cabinet are the declaration of Azerbaijani language as the state language of the Azerbaijan Democratic Republic on June 27, 1918; the declaration of a red banner with white crescent and eight pointed star as the first flag of the country on June 24, 1918, and changing it to a tri-color Azerbaijani flag, which is the state flag of Azerbaijan Republic today.

== See also ==
- Cabinets of Azerbaijan Democratic Republic (1918-1920)
- Cabinet of Azerbaijan
