= Nar (company) =

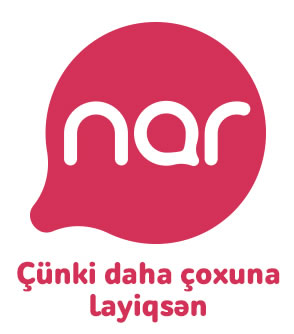
- Type: Limited liability company
- Industry: Telecommunications
- Founded: 2007
- Headquarters: Baku, Azerbaijan
- Key people: Gunnar Pahnke (Chief Executive Officer) Denis Ksenofontov (Head of Marketing) Seymur Javadov (Head of B2C sales) Hamid Imanov (Head of B2B sales)
- Products: Mobile communication services
- Website: https://www.nar.az

Nar is a brand for commercial activities of Azerfon, a mobile telecommunications company, located in Baku, Azerbaijan.

== Company background ==
Azerfon LLC launched its commercial activities on 21 March 2007 under brand name Nar Mobile.

Today, the network coverage of Azerfon claims to reach the territory of the Azerbaijan Republic. In certain remote areas (e.g. Qarxun and Sohub villages of Quba district) Nar is the only provider offering service. Currently, over 2,100,000 subscribers use the network. In 2009 a non-stock partnership agreement was signed between Azerfon LLC and Vodafone Company. In December 2009 Azerfon released its 3G (UMTS) network, the first GSM operator in Azerbaijan to do so.

== Marketing ==
Nar in Azerbaijani means pomegranate and that fruit is commonly used in the company's advertising which, it has been claimed, is a 'symbol of the relationship between Azerbaijan’s rich cultural heritage and modern life'. In 2011, Nar Mobile advertisements prominently featured Ell & Nikki, Azerbaijan's Eurovision Song Contest 2011 winners. On April 6, 2015, the company announced rebranding, changing the brand name as Nar, the logo to symbolize pomegranate & communication bubble, and updating creative platform, as "Nar Garden."

== See also ==
- Telecommunications in Azerbaijan
- Ministry of Communications and Information Technologies (Azerbaijan)
- List of Azerbaijani companies
