= Azercell =

Azerbaijani telecommunications company

Azercell Telecom LLC
- Company type: Public
- Industry: Telecommunications
- Founded: 1996; 30 years ago
- Headquarters: Baku, Azerbaijan
- Area served: Azerbaijan
- Key people: Zarina Zeynalova (CEO)
- Products: Fixed telephony; Mobile telephony; Internet services; Wireless broadband; Value-added service
- Owner: AzInTelecom LLC of the Ministry of Transport, Communications with High Technologies of Azerbaijan
- Website: www.azercell.com/az/

Azercell is an Azerbaijani telecommunications company based in Baku. It is the largest mobile network operator in Azerbaijan. The company is owned by the ruling Aliyev family through offshore companies. In 2008, state shares were transferred to the Aliyev family's companies at a massive discount, effectively costing Azerbaijan's people at least $600 million.

== Company background ==
Azercell Telecom LLC was established in January 1996 as a joint venture between the Azerbaijan government and Turkcell, a large Turkish mobile operator. In this arrangement, the Azerbaijan government owned 51% of the operator.

Azercell Telecom started its activities on 15 December 1996. Azercell become the second-largest taxpayer operating outside the country's oil sector.

In 2004, TeliaSonera, a Swedish company, was involved in negotiations to privatize Azercell. The Azerbaijan government stepped in to block TeliaSonera from privatizing the state-owned company on its own. The government instructed TeliaSonera that Cenay Insaat (a Turkish company known for collaborating with the Aliyev regime) and an unknown "local partner" had to undertake the privatization. Shares of the company were transferred to the local partner, which investigative reporting revealed was registered to offshore companies owned by the family of Azerbaijan ruler Ilham Aliyev.

In 2018, Fintur Holdings, in which Telia had a 58.55 percent ownership, sold its stake in Azertel to Azerbaijan International Telecom LLC, which is owned by the Republic of Azerbaijan.

== Services ==
=== 4G ===
Azercell announced on 24 May 2012, the launch of services based on the 4G platform. Azercell's 4G network covers all of Baku city and nearby towns. The networks operate on 1800 MHz frequency. MTS The second region where the 4G network got deployed, is the Nakhchivan Autonomous Republic.

== Market share and coverage ==
51% of Azerbaijan's mobile market belongs to Azercell; while its geographical coverage constitutes 94.15% and population coverage is 98.70%.

== See also ==
- Telecommunications in Azerbaijan
- Ministry of Communications and Information Technologies (Azerbaijan)
- List of Azerbaijani companies
