= Committee for State Security of the Azerbaijan Soviet Socialist Republic =

Committee for State Security of the Azerbaijan Soviet Socialist Republic (Russian: Комитет государственной безопасности Азербайджанская ССР) or KGB of the AzSSR was the security agency of the Azerbaijan Soviet Socialist Republic, being the local branch of the Committee for State Security of the USSR. Its headquarters was on Narimanov Avenue in Baku, capital of the Azerbaijan SSR.

== History ==
The KGB in Azerbaijan was founded in 1954 and would eventually be succeeded by the State Security Service of the Republic of Azerbaijan (Dövlət Təhlükəsizlik Komitəsi) in 2015. By the decision of the Supreme Soviet of the Republic of Azerbaijan, the Ministry of National Security was established on the basis of the State Security Committee on 1 November 1991.

== Activities ==
One of the spheres of activity in the KGB was against the separatist activity of Armenians, including attempts to annex the Nakhichevan Autonomous Soviet Socialist Republic and the Nagorno-Karabakh Autonomous Oblast to the Armenian SSR. These activities specifically targeted the Armenian Revolutionary Federation. In the late 1980s, the main tasks of the KGB of the Azerbaijan SSR were to prevent the subversive activities of neighboring states against Azerbaijan. The KGB played a major role in the 1989 Baku pogrom and the Black January events. Late at night on 19 January 1990, after the special forces of the KGB took part in the demolition of the central television station and termination of phone and radio lines, making way for the Soviet Army to enter Baku. During the events, ethnic Azerbaijanis were fired or sent to other regions under various pretexts.

== Chairmen of the KGB of AzSSR ==
#	Name	Photo	Term in office	Party affiliation
1	Anatoliy Guskov		1954 — 1956	Communist Party
2	Fyodor Kopilov		September 26, 1956 — August 1959	Communist Party
3	Alexander Kardashov		August 1959 — October 12, 1963	Communist Party
4	Semyon Tsvigun		October 21, 1963 — 1967	Communist Party
5	Heydar Aliyev		June 21, 1967 — July 14, 1969	Communist Party
6	Vitaliy Krasilnikov		June 1969 — June 18, 1980	Communist Party
7	Ziya Yusifzadeh		1980 — 1988	Communist Party
8	Ivan Gorelovsky		August 11, 1988 — August 19, 1989	Communist Party
9	Vagif Huseynov		August 19, 1989 — September 13, 1991	Communist Party
10	Ilhuseyn Huseynov		September 1991 — May 1992	Communist Party
