= Rashad Nabiyev =

Azerbaijani politician

- Rəşad Nəbiyev
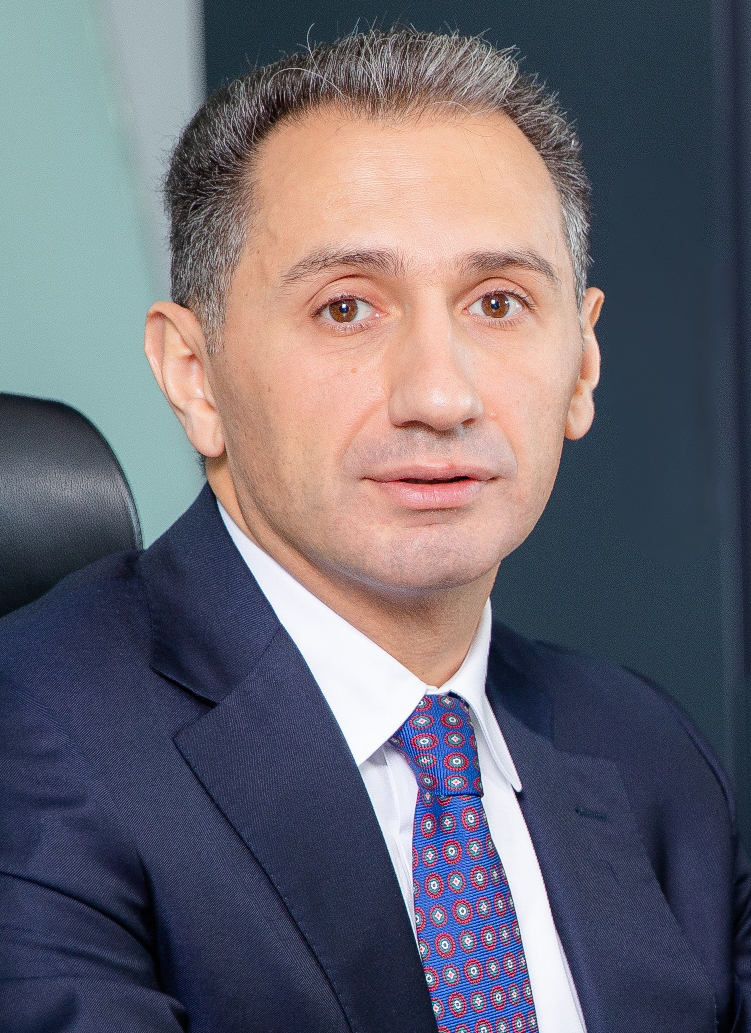
- Nabiyev in 2018

Minister of Digital Development and Transportation
- Incumbent
- Assumed office 11 October 2021
- President: Ilham Aliyev
- Preceded by: Position established

Minister of Transport, Communications and High Technologies
- In office 26 January 2021 – 11 October 2021
- President: Ilham Aliyev
- Preceded by: Ramin Guluzade
- Succeeded by: Position abolished

Chairman of the Board and Chief Executive Officer of Azercosmos
- In office 24 January 2011 – 25 January 2021

Personal details
- Born: 26 August 1977
- Education: Public Administration Academy (1994-2000), East Carolina University (2000-2002)
- Awards

Rashad Nabi Oghlu Nabiyev (Azerbaijani: Rəşad Nəbi oğlu Nəbiyev; born 1977) is an Azerbaijani politician serving as the Minister of Digital Development and Transportation of Azerbaijan since 2021. He previously served as the chairman of the board and chief executive officer of Azercosmos.

== Education ==
- 1994–2000 — Public Administration from Public Administration Academy under the auspices of President of the Republic of Azerbaijan (bachelor's and master's degrees).
- 2000–2002 — East Carolina University, United States (Master of Science in Economics).

== Career ==
- 1997–2000 — employee of the Information Resources and Technologies Center and International Relations Department at the President's Office of the Republic of Azerbaijan.
- 2002–2004 — employee of the Market Operations Department of the Central Bank of Azerbaijan.
- 2004–2011 — head of Finance, Accounting and Economic Analysis Department at the Ministry of Communications and Information Technologies of Azerbaijan.
- From 24 January 2011 — chairman of the board and chief executive officer of Azercosmos.
- 2014 — by the Order of the President of Azerbaijan Rashad Nabiyev for services in the development of space industry in Azerbaijan was awarded with the Progress medal.
- 2019 — by the Order of the President of Azerbaijan from 27 May 2019 Rashad Nabiyev was awarded with the jubilee medal dedicated to “The 100th anniversary of the Azerbaijan Democratic Republic (1918–2018)".
- 2023 — Awarded the jubilee medal “100th anniversary of Heydar Aliyev (1923–2023)” by the relevant Order of the President of the Republic of Azerbaijan.

== Links ==
- Biography at azercosmos.az (in Azerbaijani)
- Interview of Rashad Nabiyev to The Business Year (2015)
- Interview of Rashad Nabiyev to Via Satellite (2012)
