= 2007 Baku terrorist plot =

Terrorist incident in Azerbaijan

The 2007 Baku terrorist plot was a foiled terrorist plot aimed at several targets in Baku, Azerbaijan. The resulting security measures prompted the closure of the American and British embassies. Some institutions such as Norwegian Statoil and American McDermott oil companies limited their activity.

On October 29, 2007, Azerbaijani law enforcement agencies reported that they had detained a group of Salafis armed with grenade launchers who were preparing an attack near the United States and British embassies. According to the National Security Ministry spokesman it was discovered that the group had four Kalashnikov assault rifles, one Kalashnikov grenade launcher, 20 grenades, ammunition and automatic weapon parts. The group was also reported to have planned to attack a number of state buildings and representatives of private companies.

== Background ==
On October 25, 2007, the Azerbaijani Ministry of Defense reported that one of the army officers had deserted his regiment, taking four Kalashnikov assault rifles and a machine gun from a military base. The Ministry of National Security has claimed that the officer was a follower of Salafism and the stolen arms were going to be used in terror attacks. 1st Lt. Kamran Asadov was alleged to have taken four machine guns, a mortar and 20 grenades from his military unit and hidden them in the city for a militant attack.

According to report of Azerbaijani Ministry of Public Relations Department on 6 November, Abu Jafar, Arab by nationality, affiliated with Al-Qaeda and Al-Jihad, and others came to Azerbaijan and established an armed group from the persons who formerly participated in the illegal military units in different conflict zones. During the joint measures of the law-enforcement bodies on 26 September in Qusar rayon, one of the group's members, resident of Qusar rayon, Telman Abdullayev (b. 1975) put up armed resistance, wounding two policemen with a fire-arm and managed to escape from the place of incident. In addition, other members of the group, Vidadi Kerimov, Adil Jaraykhanov, Vitali Agamammadov, Asaf Nazarov and Danial Abuyev, were detained. It was discovered that the group was plotting to help Abu Jafar to escape Azerbaijan. The apartment in Sumgayit, where Abu Jafar was hidden, was taken under control. On October 10, during an operation in the apartment Abdul Malik and Elchin Alimirzayev a.k.a. Haji were arrested but Abu Jafar fired at officers and managed to escape.

== Operation ==
As a result of special operations, conducted on 2–3 November, Abu Jafar and other members of the group, Mirza Babayev, Gadir Hajiyev, Vugar Aliyev, Emin Cami, Logman Muradov, Habil Masmaliyev and Parviz Karimov, were detained. Due to the witty measures of the National Security Ministry's "Gartal" ("Eagle") special team, Abu Jafar was detained without damage. 1 AKMS submachine gun, 3 pistols, 1 rifle, 12 hand grenades, 11 special lighters, 1.075 grams of explosives, 4-meter long Bickford's fuse, 91 detonators, 4 pistol magazines, 4 submachine gun magazines, 25 bullets, about 600 cartridges, 3 special lanterns, 2 compasses, 1 signal firework unit, 1 electricity conducting device, maps and other supplies were discovered. Proceedings were instituted under articles 279.2, 315.2 and 228.2.1 of the Criminal Code of Azerbaijan.

== Sentencing ==
On June 18, 2009, the Serious Crime Court sentenced Kamran Asadov, Bahtiar Orujov, Farid Jabbarov, Kamran Babayev and Samir Mehraliyev to a 15-year imprisonment.

The court also sentenced other members of the group;

- Elshan Mammadov, Vugar Aliyev and Ilkin Ismailov to 14 years
- Tarlan Karimov - 13 years
- Yashar Maharramov and Rovshan Abdulaliyev to 12 years and 6 months
- Ramil Karimov and Samir Aliyev to 12 years
- Ramin Jalilov - 11 years
- Orkhan Alizadeh - 10 years and 6 months
- Shirvani Babayev and Azerbaijani Ibadov - 10 years
- Edgar Aliyev - 6 years and 6 months
- Hajibala Huseynov - 6 years and three months
- Shahriyar Maharramov - 2 years

The court adopted a resolution and sent a notification to the Defense Ministry to annul a lieutenant rank from Asadov.
