= Abdulali bey Amirjanov =

Azerbaijani statesman

Abdulali bey Amirjanov Əbdüləli bəy Əmircanov
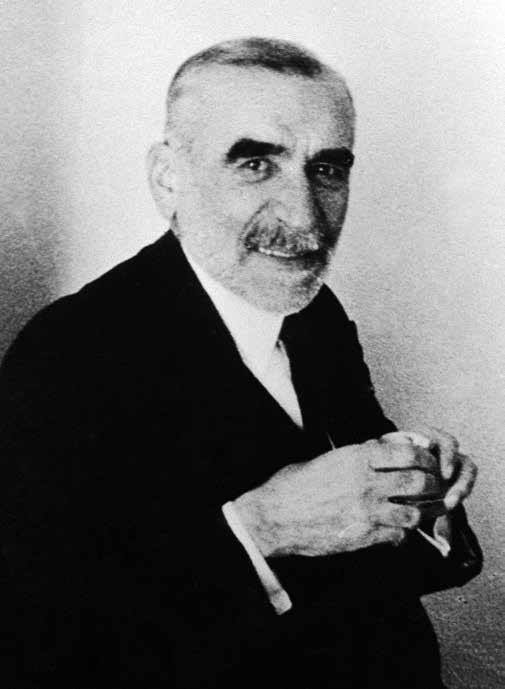

State Controller of Azerbaijan Democratic Republic (ADR)
- In office October 6, 1918 – December 7, 1918
- President: Fatali Khan Khoyski; Prime Minister, (Chairman of Azerbaijani Parliament)
- Preceded by: Jamo bey Hajinski
- Succeeded by: Mehdi bey Hajinski

Minister of Finance of Azerbaijan Democratic Republic
- In office June 17, 1918 – October 6, 1918
- Preceded by: Nasib bey Yusifbeyli
- Succeeded by: Mammad Hasan Hajinski

Personal details
- Born: 1870 Shaki, Azerbaijan
- Died: 1948 (aged 77–78) Istanbul, Turkey

Abdulali bey Amirjanov Shirali bey oghlu (Azerbaijani: Əbdüləli bəy Əmircanov Şirəli bəy oğlu; 1870–1948) was an Azerbaijani statesman who served as Minister of Finance, State Controller of Azerbaijan Democratic Republic, and was a member of Azerbaijani National Council and later Parliament of Azerbaijan.

== Early years ==
Amirjanov was born in Shaki, Russian Empire. He graduated from Alexander Pedagogical University in Tbilisi in 1888. He then worked as a teacher in Shaki and Lenkoran. Amirjanov was a member of Education Board of Nəşri-Maarif Education Society and chaired the Baku Muslim Charity Society Organization.

== Political career ==
After establishment of the Azerbaijan Democratic Republic on May 28, 1918, Amirjanov was involved in political life of the country. On June 17, 1918, when the second cabinet of Azerbaijan Democratic Republic convened, Amirjanov was appointed Minister of Finance and served in the position until October 6, when the cabinet went through reshuffling and he was appointed State Controller. He held the office until December 7, 1918. Elected to the Azerbaijani parliament as an independent deputy, Amirjanov was a member of the finance-budgetary and census commissions. In order to enhance trade relations with other countries, he co-founded Dəyanət company. During Turkish Army of Islam's march on Baku in September 1918, Amirjanov along with Behbudkhan Javanshir were in the frontlines when Ələt was taken.

After takeover of Azerbaijan by Bolsheviks on April 28, 1920, Amirjanov immigrated to Turkey. He died in Istanbul in 1948.

== See also ==
- Azerbaijani National Council
- Cabinets of Azerbaijan Democratic Republic (1918–1920)
- Current Cabinet of Azerbaijan Republic
