= Namig Abbasov =

Azerbaijani diplomat and politician (1940–2024)

- Namiq Abbasov

Minister of National Security
- In office 22 March 1995 – 23 July 2004
- Preceded by: Nariman Imranov
- Succeeded by: Eldar Mahmudov

Personal details
- Born: Namig Rashid oglu Abbasov; 22 February 1940 Ordubad, Nakhichevan ASSR, Azerbaijan SSR, USSR
- Died: 27 March 2024 (aged 84)
- Party: YAP
- Education: Baku State University
- Occupation: Diplomat

Namig Rashid oglu Abbasov (Azerbaijani: Namiq Rəşid oğlu Abbasov; 22 February 1940 – 27 March 2024) was an Azerbaijani diplomat and politician. A member of the New Azerbaijan Party, he served as Minister of National Security from 1995 to 2004.

Abbasov died on 27 March 2024, at the age of 84.
