= Telecommunications in Azerbaijan =

Telecommunications Republic of Azerbaijan
Landlines (2014):	1,820,000
Mobile lines (2014):	11,000,000
ccTLD:	.az
Calling code:	+994

Telecommunications in Azerbaijan provides information about television, radio, fixed and mobile telephones, and the Internet in Azerbaijan. The Azerbaijan economy has been markedly stronger recently and, not surprisingly, the country has been making progress in developing ICT sector. Nonetheless, it still faces problems. These include poor infrastructure and an immature telecom regulatory regime. The Ministry of Communications and Information Technologies of Azerbaijan (MCIT), as well as being an operator through its role in Aztelekom, is both a policy-maker and regulator.

== Telephones ==
- Telephones - main lines in use: 1,820,000 (2014)

Country comparison to the world: 64

- Telephones - mobile cellular: 11,000,000 (2014)

Country comparison to the world: 75

=== Telephone system ===
Azerbaijan's telephone system is a combination of old Soviet era technology used by Azerbaijani citizens and small- to medium-size commercial establishments, and modern cellular telephones used by an increasing middle class, large commercial ventures, international companies, and most government officials; the average citizen waits on a 200,000-person list for telephone service; Internet and e-mail service are available in all major cities and some remote towns.
general assessment:' inadequate; requires considerable expansion and modernization; teledensity of 15 main lines per 100 persons is low; mobile-cellular penetration is increasing and is currently about 50 telephones per 100 persons.
domestic: local - the majority of telephones are in Baku or other industrial centers - about 700 villages still do not have public telephone service; intercity; all long-distance service must use Azertel's (Ministry of Communications) lines; satellite service connects Baku to a modern switch in its separated enclave of Nakhchivan Autonomous Republic.
international: the old Soviet system of cable and microwave is still serviceable; satellite service between Baku and Turkey provides access to 200 countries; additional satellite providers supply services between Baku and specific countries; Azerbaijan is a signator of the Trans-Asia-Europe Fiber-Optic Line (TAE); their lines are not laid but a Turkish satellite and a microwave link between Azerbaijan and Iran could provide Azerbaijan worldwide access

== Mobile phone ==
As of June 2014, Azerbaijan has 11.0 million subscribers in total, and a 107% penetration rate.

Rank	Operator	Technology	Subscribers (in millions)	Ownership
1	Azercell	GSM-900/1800 MHz (GPRS, EDGE); 2100 MHz UMTS, HSDPA; 2600 MHz LTE	5.17 (June 2014)	AzInTelecom MMC
2	Bakcell	GSM-900/1800 MHz (GPRS, EDGE); 2100 MHz UMTS, HSDPA; 2600 MHz LTE	3.30 (June 2014)	Bakcell
3	Nar	GSM-900/1800 MHz (GPRS, EDGE); 2100 MHz UMTS, HSDPA; 2600 MHz LTE	2.53 (June 2014)	Azerfon

There are three major mobile phone operators currently in Azerbaijan: Azercell, Bakcell and Nar (Brand of Azerfon). Azercell, Bakcell and Nar (Brand of Azerfon) offer 2G, 3G and 4G services. All three networks are widely modern and reliable, with shops located in major towns and cities where one can purchase a sim card or get assistance if needed. Most unlocked mobile phones can be used on roaming, however network charges apply. Azercell, Bakcell and Azerfon are often recommended to tourists due to the variety of tariffs available and the help available in a variety of languages. Other mobile phone operators include Aztelekom, AzEuroTel, Caspian Telecom and Catel Eurasiacom.

As of June 2014, approximately 95% of all main lines are digitized. The remaining 5% is in the modernization process.

=== International system ===
Azerbaijan is connected to the Trans-Asia-Europe (TAE) fiber-optic cable, providing international connectivity to the rest of the world. Additionally, the old Soviet system by microwave radio relay and landline connections to other countries of the Commonwealth of Independent States is still available, and by satellite earth stations. The main backbones of Azerbaijani networks are made by E3 or STM-1 lines via microwave units across the whole country with many passive retranslations. There are two major private companies in Azerbaijan that connect the country to the global Internet network. These are AzerTelecom and Delta Telekom companies.

== Radio ==
As of 2014, Azerbaijan has 9 AM stations, 17 FM stations, and one shortwave station. Additionally, there are approximately 4,350,000 radios in existence. The primary network provider is the Ministry of Communications and Information Technologies of Azerbaijan (MCIT). According to MCIT, the FM radio penetration rate is 97% according to 2014 data.

- Radio broadcast stations: 26 (2014)
  - Radio Respublika - FM 105.0 MHz
  - İctimai FM - FM 90 MHz
  - Naxçıvan Dövlət radiosu (Nakhchivan State Radio) - FM 103 MHz
  - Naxçıvanın səsi (Voice of Nakhchivan) - FM 103 MHz
  - ARAZ FM - FM 103.3 MHz
  - Radio Enerji (formerly Antenn FM) - FM 101.1 MHz
  - ANS ChM - FM 102 MHz
  - Avto FM - FM 107.7 MHz
  - Azad Azərbaycan FM - FM 106 MHz
  - Bürc FM FM 100.5 MHz
  - Kəpəz FM - FM 90.3 MHz
  - Lider FM - FM 107 MHz
  - Media FM - FM 105.5 MHz
  - Space FM - FM 104 MHz
  - Xəzər FM - FM 103 MHz
- Radios: 175,000 (1997)

== Television ==
Azerbaijan has a total of 47 television channels, of which 4 are public television channels and 43 are private television channels of which 12 are national television channels and 31 regional television channels. According to the Ministry of Communications and Information Technologies of Azerbaijan (MCIT), the television penetration rate is 99% according to 2014 data. The penetration rate of cable television in Azerbaijan totaled 28.1% of households in 2013, from a study by the State Statistical Committee of the Azerbaijan Republic. Almost 39% of the cable television subscriber base is concentrated in major cities. The penetration rate is 59.1% in the city of Baku.

- Television broadcast stations: 43 (2014)
- Televisions: 170,000 (1997)

== Internet ==
- Internet service providers (ISPs): 15 (2005) 29 (2009)
- Country code: AZE
- Internet TLD: .az
- Internet hosts: 46,856 (2011)

Country comparison to the world: 98

- Internet users: 2.200,000 (2014)

Country comparison to the world: 70

- Internet penetration: 77% (2015)

== See also ==
- Ministry of Communications and Information Technologies (Azerbaijan)
