= Vagif Huseynov =

Azerbaijani military officer and politician (1942–2024)

- Vaqif Hüseynov

Chairman of the Committee for State Security of the Azerbaijan Soviet Socialist Republic
- In office 19 August 1989 – 13 September 1991
- Preceded by: Ivan Gorelovsky
- Succeeded by: Ilhuseyn Huseynov

Personal details
- Born: 27 November 1942 Quba, Azerbaijan SSR, USSR
- Died: 3 June 2024 (aged 81) Russia
- Party: CPSU
- Education: Baku State University
- Occupation: Military officer

Vagif Huseynov (Azerbaijani: Vaqif Əliövsət oğlu Hüseynov; 27 November 1942 – 3 June 2024) was an Azerbaijani military officer and politician. A member of the Communist Party of the Soviet Union, he served as chairman of the Committee for State Security of the Azerbaijan Soviet Socialist Republic from 1989 to 1991.

Huseynov died in Russia on 3 June 2024, at the age of 81.
