= Ali Naghiyev =

Azerbaijani lieutenant general

Ali Naghiyev Əli Nağıyev
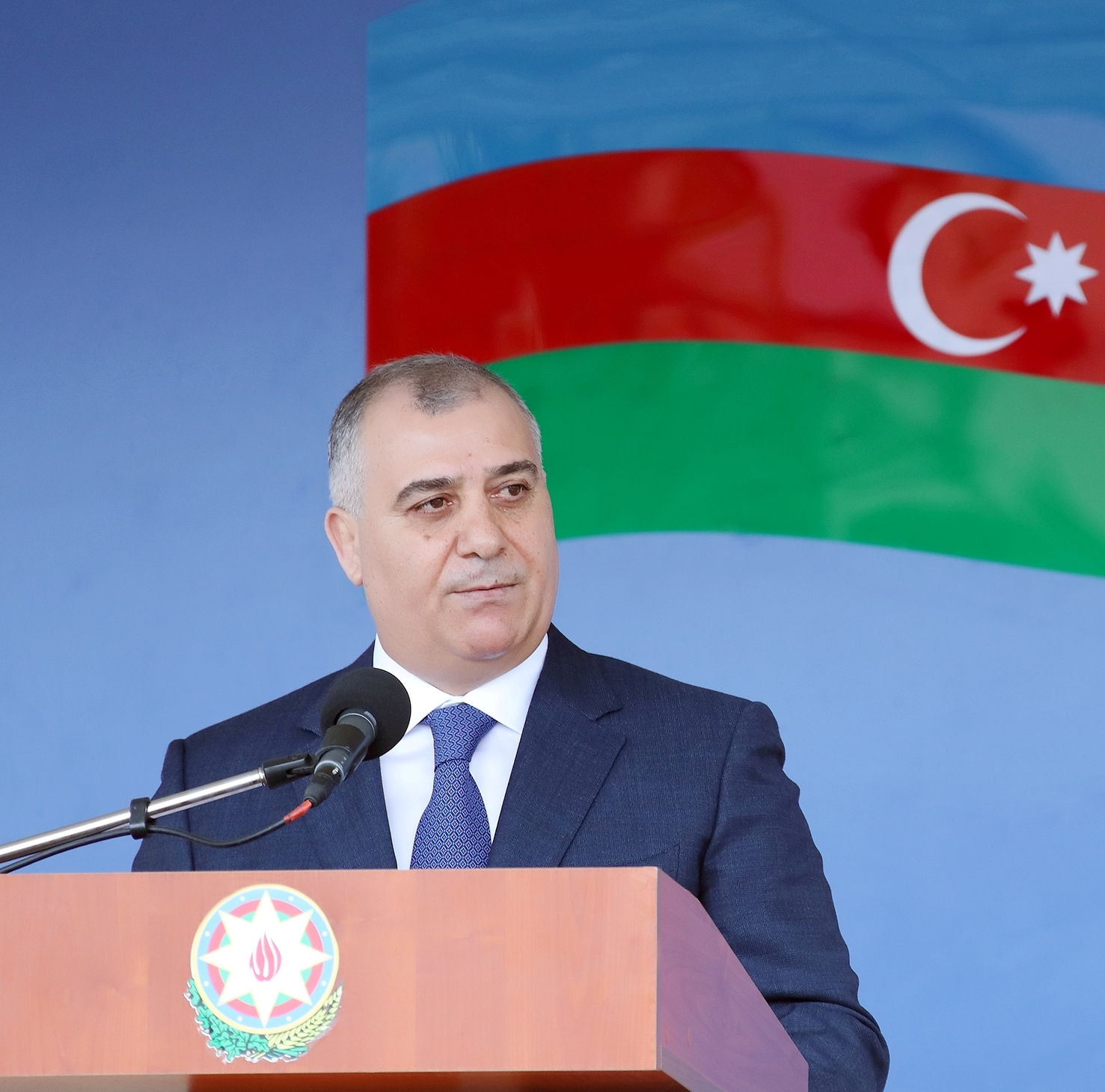

2nd Chief of the State Security Service of the Republic of Azerbaijan
- Incumbent
- Assumed office 20 June 2019
- President: Ilham Aliyev
- Preceded by: Madat Guliyev

Deputy Minister of National Security of the Republic of Azerbaijan
- In office 16 March 2005 – 11 April 2011
- President: Ilham Aliyev

Personal details
- Born: 8 November 1958 (age 67) Babek Rayon, Azerbaijan SSR, USSR
- Education: Azerbaijan State Pedagogical University

Military service
- Branch/service: KGB; Ministry of National Security; State Security Service
- Years of service: 1986–1991; 1991–present
- Rank: Colonel general

Ali Naghi oglu Naghiyev (Azerbaijani: Əli Nağı oğlu Nağıyev; born 8 November 1958) is an Azerbaijani Colonel general, Head of the State Security Service of the Republic of Azerbaijan, Chairman of the State Commission on Prisoners of War, Hostages and Missing Persons, Deputy Minister of the National Security of the Republic of Azerbaijan (2005-2011).

== Life ==
Naghiyev was born on 8 November 1958, in Babek District of the Nakhchivan Autonomous Soviet Socialist Republic. In 1981, he graduated from the Azerbaijan Pedagogical Institute. He started working in 1975. After graduating from the Higher Courses of the KGB of the USSR in 1986, he served in responsible positions in the operational structures of the State Security Committee of the Azerbaijan SSR and the Ministry of National Security of the Republic of Azerbaijan.

On 16 March 2005, he was appointed the Deputy Minister of National Security of the Republic of Azerbaijan.

On 27 March 2006, Naghiyev was given the high military rank of Major General. In 2011-2019, he worked as the Deputy Chief of the General Anti-Corruption Directorate under the General Prosecutor of the Republic of Azerbaijan. On 5 August 2014, Naghiyev was appointed the Special Rank of State Judicial Counselor of the 3rd class.

On 20 June 2019, he was appointed the Chief of the State Security Service of the Republic of Azerbaijan.

On 27 June 2019, Naghiyev was appointed to the high military rank of lieutenant general.

On 7 December 2020, Naghiyev was appointed to the high military rank of colonel general.

== Personal life ==
His sons Ilham and Ilgar Nagiyev control an offshore real estate and construction empire. Ilham Naghiyev was a head of "Inci Shadliq Sarayi" LLC in 2009. The palace was managed by Huseyn Mammadov has managed multiple companies owned and controlled by Ali Naghiyev's sons for the past 14 years.

== Awards ==
Azaerbaijan's government has awarded Naghiyev with numerous awards.

- Medal "For military service" (24 December 1998)
- Order "Azerbaijani Flag" (27 March 2002)
- Medal "For the Fatherland" (25 March 2004)
- Medal “For Heroism” (16 March 2005)
- Order "Merit to the Fatherland" (28 September 2018)
- Order "For Merit to the Fatherland" (27 March 2020)
- Zafar Order (9 December 2020)
