= Jeyshullah =

Jeyshullah Ceyşullah
- Leader: Mubariz Aliyev
- Dissolved: 1999
- Ideology: Islamism; Islamist extremism Jihadism; Salafism
- Religion: Islam

Jeyshullah was an armed Islamic extremist and Sunni Islamist group, created in late 1990s in Turkey, but operated mainly in Azerbaijan. Responsible for multiple assassinations, including the killing of Etibar Erkin and Ziya Bunyadov, the group's members were trained in Syria, Saudi Arabia, and Afghanistan. The group's targets were turning Azerbaijan into a country with Sharia law, attacking the Hare Krishna temple and the American embassy in Baku. The leader, Mubariz Aliyev was arrested and the group was mainly neutralized in 1999.
