= Xurəl =

- Municipality
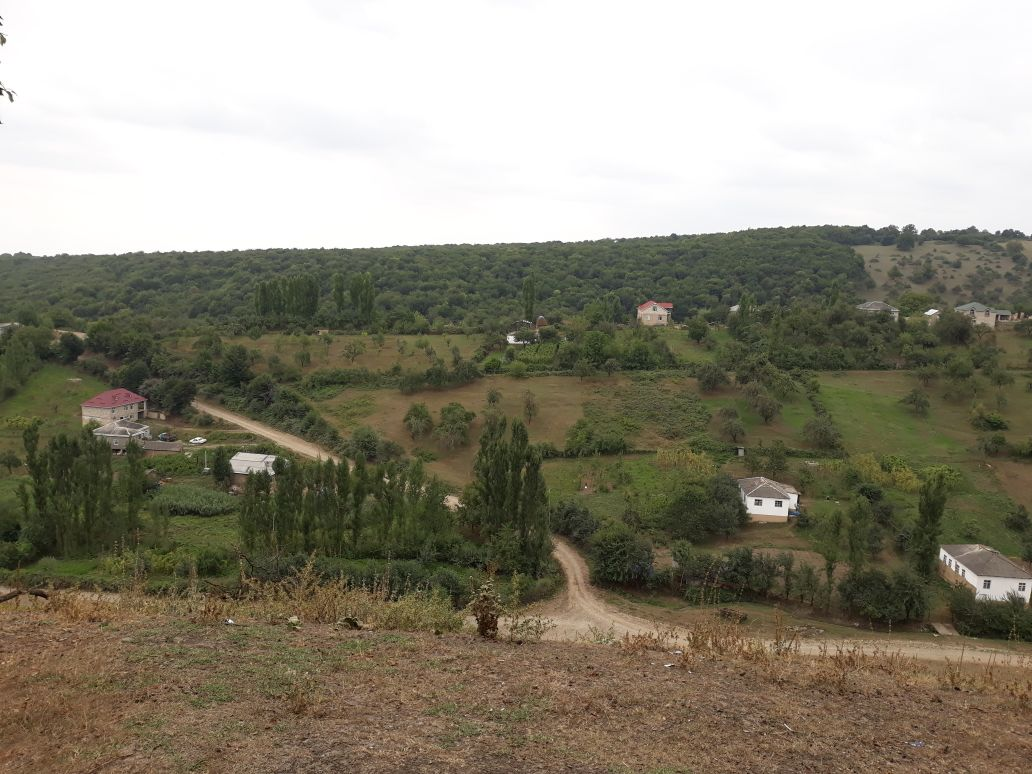

- Location within Azerbaijan
- Coordinates: 41°25′56″N 48°21′06″E
- Country: Azerbaijan
- Rayon: Qusar

Population
  - Total: 1,061
- Time zone: UTC+4 (AZT)
  - Summer (DST): UTC+5 (AZT)

Xurəl (also, Xürəl and Khurel’) is a village and municipality in the Qusar Rayon of Azerbaijan. It has a population of 1,061.
