= Ministry of National Security of Azerbaijan =

Intelligence agency

- Milli Təhlükəsizlik Nazirliyi
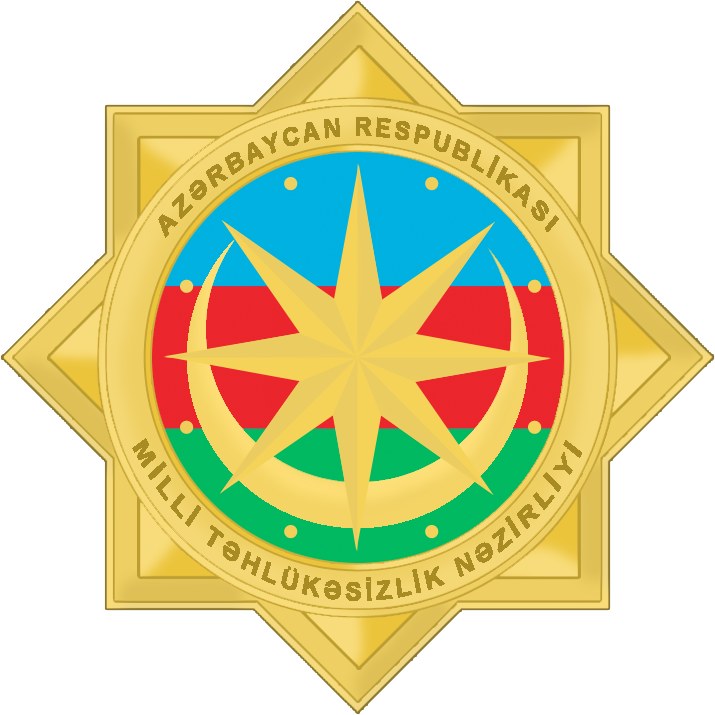

Agency overview
- Formed: 1 November 1991
- Preceding agency: KGB of Azerbaijan SSR
- Dissolved: 14 December 2015
- Superseding agencies: State Security Service; Foreign Intelligence Service
- Jurisdiction: Government of Azerbaijan
- Headquarters: Baku, Azerbaijan
- Website: www.mns.gov.az/

The Ministry of National Security (MNS, Azerbaijani: Milli Təhlukəsizlik Nazirliyi) was an intelligence agency within the cabinet of Azerbaijan. The MNS was a central executive authority that carried out the competencies designated to it by the legislation of the Republic of Azerbaijan in the field of obtaining and analyzing information about foreign affairs, corporations, individuals.

The MNS also carried out intelligence, counter-intelligence, protection of state secrets, revealing, preventing, precluding and detection of crimes.

== History ==
Ministry of National Security of Azerbaijan was established on the material-technical and personnel basis of the Soviet Committee of State Security (KGB) on November 1, 1991. Within a short period of time, representatives of other nationalities had left the Ministry and Azerbaijan, the process of staffing Ministry only by the national specialists had begun. Not only the name and the personnel of the security body had changed, but primary change the Ministry faced was its mission and duties.

On 14 December 2015, President Ilham Aliyev signed a decree dissolving the ministry and creating a National Security Service with domestic duties and a foreign intelligence service.

== Organization ==
The Ministry was guided by the Constitution of the Republic of Azerbaijan, the laws of the Republic of Azerbaijan, the decrees of President, the decisions and decrees of the Cabinet of Ministers, the international treaties of which Azerbaijan was a part, its statute, and other normative-legal acts of the MNS.

The MNS headquarters were in the following cities:

- Baku
- Ganja
- Nakhchivan

== MNS operations ==
In 2008, the MNS arrested a dozen of Al-Qaeda members who were involved in terrorist attack on Abu Bakr Mosque.

=== Foreign ties and cooperation ===
The MNS has ties to several foreign intelligence agencies including National Intelligence Organization, Mossad and others. The MNS helped thwart the 2000 assassination attempt on Russian president Vladimir Putin by Iraqi citizen Kenan Ahmed Rustam in Martyrs' Lane.

== Ministers (1991–2015) ==
=== Ministers of National Security of Azerbaijan ===
№	President		Term of office			Political party	Government	Elected	Ref
№	Portrait	Name	Took office	Left office	Days	Political party	Government	Elected	Ref
1		Ilhuseyn Huseynov; İlhüseyn Hüseynov (1925–2006)	18 October 1991	17 May 1992	212	Independent	1. Ayaz Mutallibov	1991	
1		Ilhuseyn Huseynov; İlhüseyn Hüseynov (1925–2006)	1991 Azerbaijani Mil Mi-8 shootdown.						
2		Fakhraddin Tahmazov; Fəxrəddin Təhməzov (1951–)	17 May 1992	3 June 1993	382	Azerbaijani Popular Front Party	—	1992	
3		Nariman Imranov; Nəriman İmranov (1944–)	3 June 1993	15 October 1994	499	Azerbaijani Popular Front Party	3. Abulfaz Elchibey	1993	
3		Nariman Imranov; Nəriman İmranov (1944–)	Imprisoned for life for coup d'état attempt in 1994, pardoned in 2002.						
4		Namig Abbasov; Namiq Abbasov (1940–2024)	22 March 1995	23 July 2004	3411	New Azerbaijan Party	4. Heydar Aliyev	1995	
4		Namig Abbasov; Namiq Abbasov (1940–2024)	1994 Baku Metro bombings; foiled 1995 Azeri coup d'état attempt.						
5		Eldar Mahmudov; Eldar Mahmudov (1956–)	23 July 2004	17 October 2015	7514	New Azerbaijan Party	5. Ilham Aliyev	2004	
5		Eldar Mahmudov; Eldar Mahmudov (1956–)	Operation Black Belt; Attack on Abu Bakr Mosque of Baku; Foiled 2007 Baku terrorist plot; Azerbaijan State Oil Academy shooting.						

== See also ==
- List of leaders of Azerbaijan's state security agencies
- Politics of Azerbaijan
- Terrorism in Azerbaijan
