= Agha Ashurov =

Azerbaijani politician (1880–1936)

Agha Ashurov Ağa Aşurov
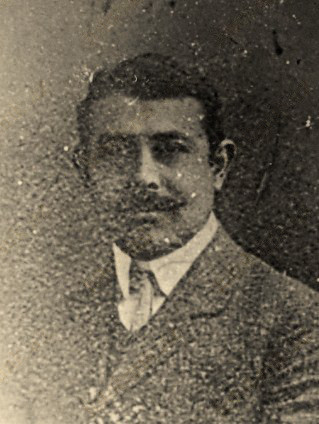

Minister of Postal Service and Telegraph of Azerbaijan Democratic Republic (ADR)
- In office 6 October 1918 – 26 December 1918
- President: Fatali Khan Khoyski Prime Minister, (Chairman of Azerbaijani Parliament)
- Preceded by: office established
- Succeeded by: Aslan bey Safikurdski

Minister of Industry and Trade of Azerbaijan Democratic Republic (ADR)
- In office 17 June 1918 – 26 December 1918
- Preceded by: office established
- Succeeded by: Mirza Asadullayev

Personal details
- Born: July 8, 1886 Baku, Baku Governorate
- Died: 1936 (aged 49–50) Rostov, RSFSR, USSR

Agha Ashurov (Azerbaijani: Ağa Aşurov Hacı Aslan oğlu; 1886–1936) was an Azerbaijani statesman who served as Minister of Industry and Trade and Minister of Postal Service and Telegraph of Azerbaijan Democratic Republic, and was member of Parliament of Azerbaijan.

== Early years ==
Agha Ashurov was born on July 8 [O.S. June 25] 1886 in Baku, Azerbaijan, then part of Baku Governorate of Russian Empire. He was the second son of international trading and shipping tycoon, Haji Aslan Ashurov. The Ashurov family of Baku traces its trading and shipping operations back to the early eighteenth century. The family was politically active since the Tsarist period: Agha's uncle, Ali Iskander Ashurov (known as Iskander Ashurov) was a prominent member of the All-Russia Congress of Muslims and also of the Ittifaqi al-Muslimin political party.

Agha Ashurov graduated from Baku Gymnasium and from an Engineering Technology Department of a university in Germany. Upon his return to Baku, he worked at the Baku Municipality Office. In 1908, he led a project for construction of a new Baku Power Station and participated in construction of Shollar water channel to Baku from Khachmaz. Ashurov also was a member of board of director of Nəşri-maarif publishing house.

== Political career ==
In early 1900s, Ashurov was elected member to Baku City Duma and Executive Committee of Muslim National Council, frequently attending Baku Congresses of Caucasian Muslims. At the time of massacres of Azerbaijanis by Armenians and Bolsheviks in March 1918, Ashurov was a member of Muslim Representatives Committee, negotiating during peace talks with Revolutionary Defense Committee, Armenian National Council and Iranian Consul to Azerbaijan Habibullah khan.

After establishment of Azerbaijani Democratic Republic, Ashurov became a member of Musavat and member of Parliament of Azerbaijan. He was appointed Minister of Industry and Trade in the second cabinet of ADR on 17 June 1918. After administrative reforms within the Cabinet of Azerbaijan on 6 October 1918, the Ministry of Transportation (Railway Communications), Postal Service and Telegraph was divided into Ministry of Transportation and Ministry of Postal Service and Telegraph. Khudadat bey Malik-Aslanov remained as Minister of Transportation (Railway Communications) while Ashurov was appointed Minister of Postal Service and Telegraph. He was replaced by Aslan bey Safikurdski on 26 December 1918, when the new third cabinet was established.

During the invasion of Red Army, he was the only member of government who voted against surrendering to the Bolsheviks. Therefore, a warrant for his arrest was issued by Bolshevik, but Ashurov was able to escape. Unable to pass to Turkey, Ashurov stayed in Azerbaijan. He died in Rostov in 1936.

== See also ==
- Azerbaijani National Council
- Cabinets of Azerbaijan Democratic Republic (1918-1920)
