= State Security Service (Azerbaijan) =

Domestic intelligence agency and secret police

- Dövlət Təhlükəsizlik Xidməti

Agency overview
- Formed: 14 December 2015
- Preceding agency: Ministry of National Security
- Jurisdiction: Government of Azerbaijan
- Headquarters: Baku, Azerbaijan
- Agency executive: Ali Naghiyev
- Website: dtx.gov.az

The State Security Service (Azerbaijani: Dövlət Təhlükəsizlik Xidməti; DTX) is the principle domestic intelligence agency and secret police of Azerbaijan, created out of the 2015 dissolution of the Ministry of National Security. The DTX was established by Presidential Decree 706 of 14 December 2015, issued by Ilham Aliyev. Headquartered in Baku, the agency has been led by Colonel General Ali Naghiyev since June 2019.

Its foreign intelligence counterpart is the Foreign Intelligence Service.

== Legal basis ==
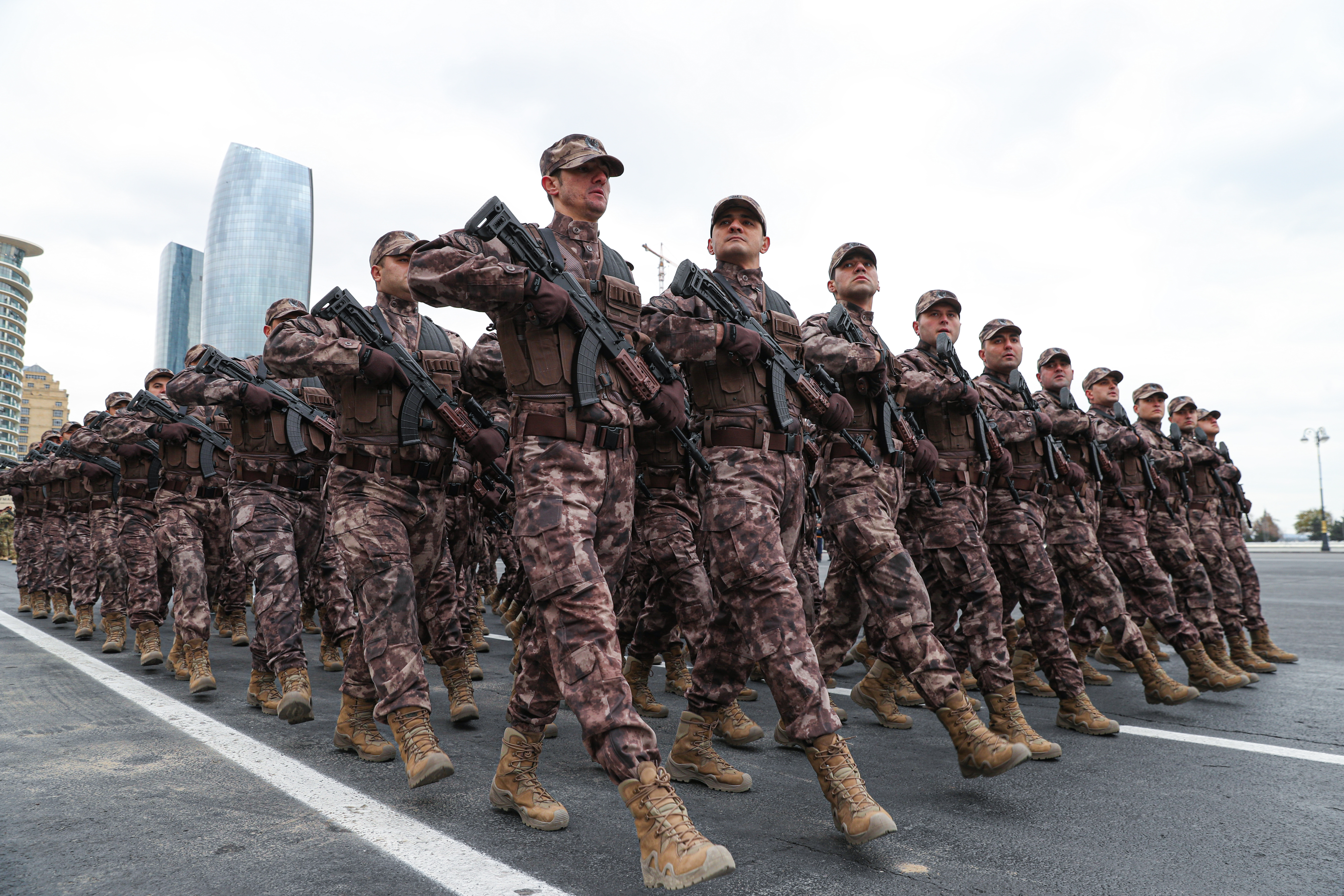
Servicemen of the State Security Service of Azerbaijan at the Baku Victory Parade of 2020.

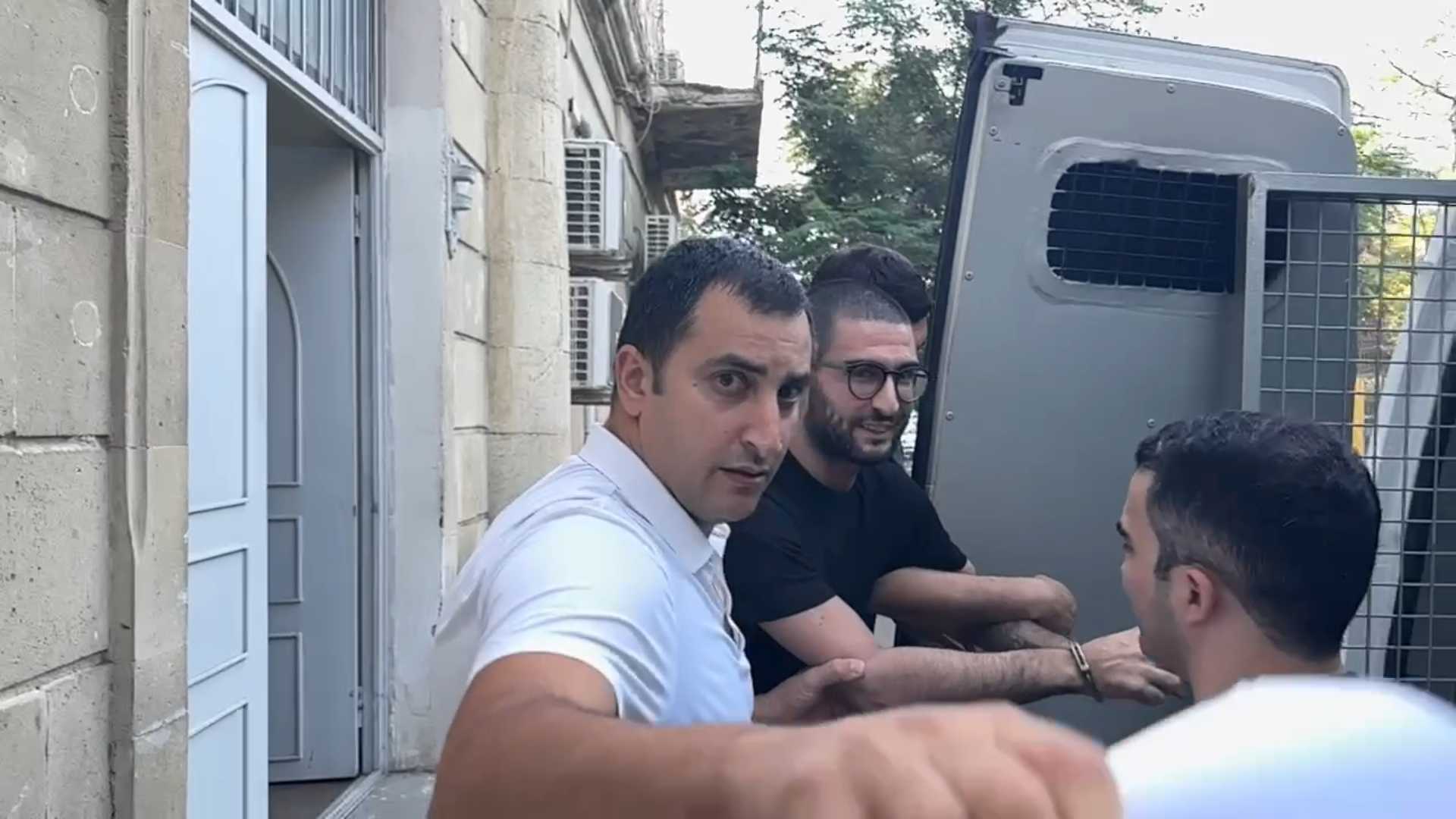
Pro-democracy activist Bahruz Samadov (in black T-shirt) was arrested by the State Security Service in 2024

The legal basis of the activities of the State Security Service contains the Constitution of the Republic of Azerbaijan, the laws and legislative acts of the Republic of Azerbaijan: “Intelligence and counterintelligence activities”, “On national security”, “On the fight against terrorism”, “On operational-investigative activities”, “On state secret” and others, the statute of State Security Service of the Republic of Azerbaijan, decrees and orders of the President of the Republic of Azerbaijan, resolutions and Orders of the Cabinet of Ministers of the Republic of Azerbaijan, central executive bodies` normative legal acts adopted following legislation, international agreements signed by the Republic of Azerbaijan following the laws of the Republic of Azerbaijan.

State Security Service operates following commitments of observing the human and civil rights and freedom, humanism, the principle of responsibility for the state and society.

== Lineage ==
- Organization to Fight against Counter-Revolution (1918-1920)
- Extraordinary Commissions of the Cheka (1920-1921)
- State Political Department (1922-1934)
- Main State Security Department (SSSD) of People's Commissariat of Internal Affairs (1934-1945)
- Ministry of State Security (1945-1959)
- Committee for State Security of the Azerbaijani Soviet Socialist Republic (1959-1991)
- Ministry of National Security (1991-2015)
- State Security Service (2015–present)

== Structure ==
- Academy of the State Security Service named after Heydar Aliyev (Azerbaijani: Dövlət Təhlükəsizliyi Xidmətinin Heydər Əliyev adına Akademiyası)
- Medical Center
- International Anti-Terror Training Center
- Cultural Center

=== Academy ===
The Academy of the State Security Service was established in the basis of decree of president of Azerbaijan dated 1 December 1998. The main goal of the academy is to train highly qualified personnel for national security agencies.

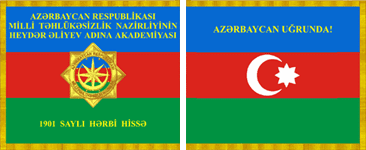
The flag of the academy.

The academy has 3 faculties:

- Faculty of Border Troops
- Faculty of Training of Operational Workers
- Faculty of Retraining and Advanced Training

=== Medical Center ===
The Main Military Medical Department of the State Security Service was inaugurated on 12 November 2013, providing sanatorium-resort treatment and recreation for the SSS military personnel and retirees and their families. It is located at 1 Maktabli Street in the municipality of Badamdar in the Sabail District.

The polyclinic of the Main Military Medical Department carries out initial examinations and outpatient treatment of military servicemen, retirees and their families.

=== Cultural Center ===
The building where the Cultural Center of the State Security Service is located at the site of a church designed by the famous Polish architect Jozef Ploszko in 1909–1912, which was demolished under Bolshevik rule in 1931. In the 1930s, a decision was made to establish a cultural club in Baku for the security bodies known as the Dzerzhinsky Club. It was under construction from 1938 to 1939, although construction work was halted due to World War II. In 1947, the construction of the building was completed by the State Design Institute. Party congresses and anniversary ceremonies of the KGB were held in the building in the Soviet era.

On 31 January 2008, the building was handed over to the State Security Service and the official opening of the building after major overhaul was held on 14 March 2009. The Cultural Center has a concert hall for 600 people, a small hall for 100 people, a conference hall and a restaurant for 120 people.
