= Ministry of Digital Development and Transportation (Azerbaijan) =

Government ministry of Azerbaijan

Ministry of Digital Development and Transportation of the Republic of Azerbaijan
- Azərbaycan Respublikası Rəqəmsal İnkişaf və Nəqliyyat Nazirliyi
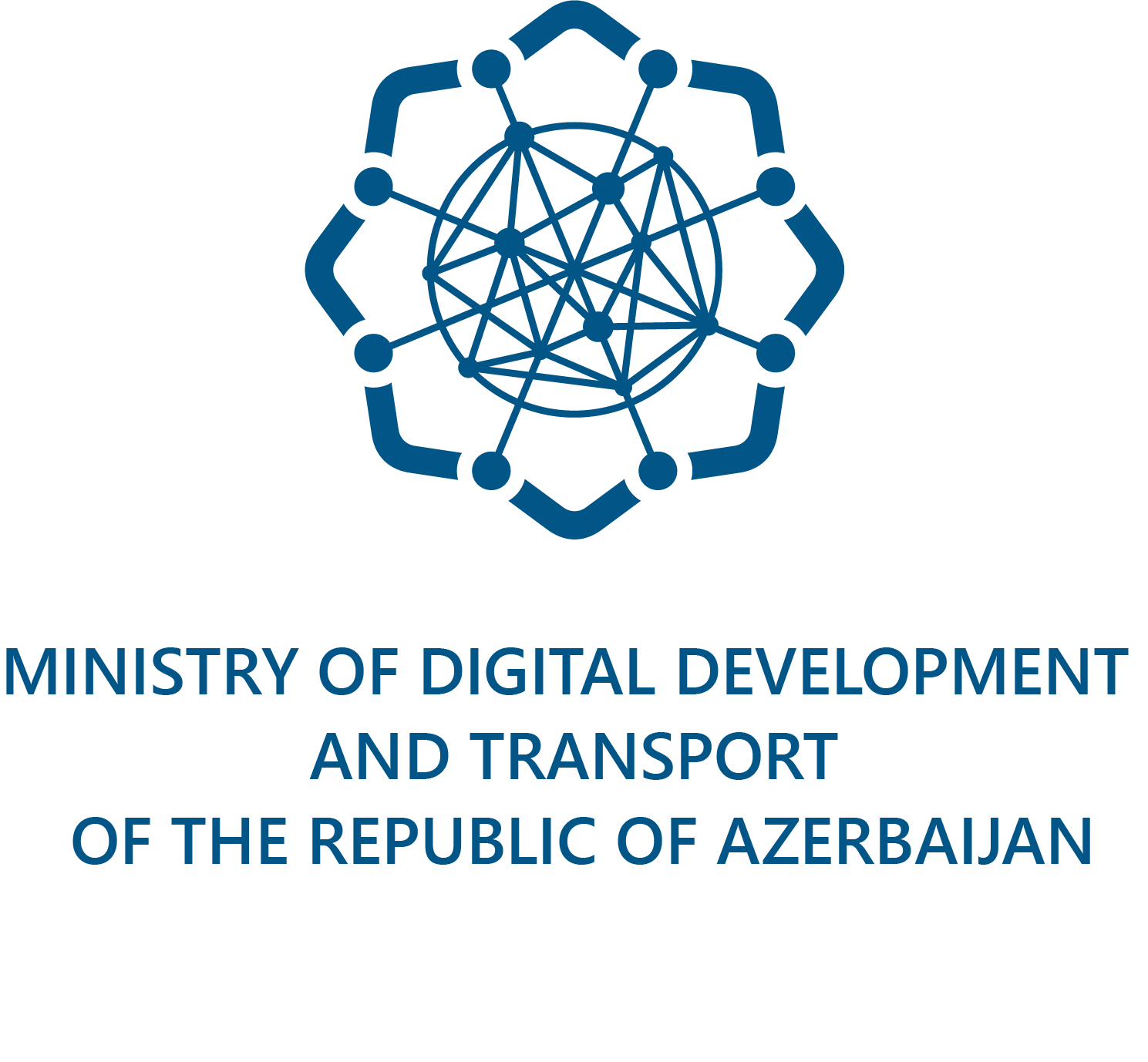

Agency overview
- Formed: 1953
- Preceding agencies: Transportation, Postal Service and Telegraph (May 28, 1918); Mail and Telegraph Commissariat (1920); Communication Ministry of Azerbaijan SSR (1953); Ministry of Communications (1991); Ministry of Communications and High Technologies (2017); Ministry of Digital Development and Transportation (2021)
- Jurisdiction: Government of Azerbaijan
- Headquarters: Zarifa Aliyeva str. 77, Baku, Azerbaijan Republic AZ1000
- Agency executives: Rashad Nabiyev, Minister; Rahman Hummatov, Deputy Minister; Javid Gurbanov, Deputy Minister; Samir Mammadov, Deputy Minister
- Website: mincom.gov.az

The Ministry of Digital Development and Transportation (Azerbaijani: Azərbaycan Respublikası Rəqəmsal İnkişaf və Nəqliyyat Nazirliyi) is a central executive body implementing state policy and regulation in the areas of transport (except for the cases determined by the President of the Republic of Azerbaijan), including maritime transport and civil aviation, communications (telecommunication, post), high technologies (information technologies, microelectronics, nano, bio and other innovative science-intensive technologies).

== History ==
The first Ministry of Postal Service and Telegraph of the country was established on May 28, 1918, with declaration of independence of Azerbaijan Democratic Republic (ADR). The first minister was Khudadat bey Malik-Aslanov. When the second cabinet of ADR convened, the government conducted administrative reforms and split the ministry into Ministry of Transportation and the new Ministry of Postal Service and Telegraph. While Malik-Aslanov remained Minister of Transportation, Agha Ashurov was put in charge to lead the Ministry of Postal Service and Telegraph on October 6, 1918. In three successive governments, Aslan bey Safikurdski, Jamo bey Hajinski and J. Ildyrym served as ministers of Postal Service and Telegraph. After establishment of Soviet rule in Azerbaijan on April 28, 1920, the ministry was transformed into Mail and Telegraph Commissariat. From the time of its inception by Soviet authorities, the communications sector was directly managed by permanent representatives of Ministry of Communications of USSR in Azerbaijan until 1953. After restoration of independence of Azerbaijan in 1991, the Ministry of Communications was re-established.

On February 24, 2004, as per the Presidential Decree of Ilham Aliyev the Ministry of Communications was transformed into a bigger Ministry of Communication and Information Technologies.

The Ministry of Communications and High Technologies of the Republic of Azerbaijan (MCHT) was established on the basis of the Ministry of Communications and Information Technologies of the Republic of Azerbaijan by the Order of President of the Republic of Azerbaijan dated March 7, 2014.

On February 13, 2017, as per the Presidential Decree of Ilham Aliyev the Ministry of Communication and Information Technologies was merged with Ministry of Transportation and transformed into a bigger Ministry of Transport, Communications and High Technologies.

== Projects ==
=== Online Azerbaijan ===
In the early 2021s, the ministry launched the "Online Azerbaijan" project in order to provide access to high-speed Internet for the population and organizations even in the most remote residential areas of Azerbaijan. The ministry says that the work on the project will be completed by the end of 2024.

=== Dilmanc project ===
This project is designed to create and implement formal linguistic technologies for the Azerbaijani language. Translation and dictionary systems between English, Russian and Azerbaijani languages have been created in the project and is available as an online service. European Association of Machine Translation (EAMT) included Dilmanc Project to the list of European research groups. Within this project voice-responded mobile computer was developed and distributed for blind users. This is a joint project of the Ministry of Transport, Communications and High Technologies and the Heydar Aliyev Foundation.

In 2010, the project leader A.Fatullayev was awarded honorary title “ Honored Engineer” by the president of Azerbaijan.

=== TASIM Project ===
Trans-Eurasian Information Super Highway (TASIM) is a transnational fiber-optic line covering Eurasian countries from the western Europe to the eastern Asia. The declaration on implementation of the project was adopted in Baku on November 11, 2008. The project provides main transit link from Frankfurt to Hong Kong, and the network will bring together the largest information exchange centers in Europe and Asia. The transit line will stretch across China, Kazakhstan, Georgia, Turkey and Germany. The northern transit link will pass through the territory of Russia, Ukraine and Poland.

=== AzDataCom Project ===
The project was established by the Ministry of Transport, Communications and High Technologies in a partnership with United Nations Development Program (UNDP) and provides a network infrastructure for data transmission covering all regions of the country. The main objectives of the project are elimination of the digital difference in the country, provision of opportunities to use e-government services, development of e-government, meeting the demand of the government agencies, the public and the business sector for ICT services.

In the framework of the project, AzDataCom network was carried out in 4 stages. At the first and second stages the network segment covering Baku, Sumgait cities and Absheron peninsula was commissioned. At the stages of 3rd and 4th areas located along the Baku-Ganja, Yevlakh- Shirvan and Baku-Astara were added to the network.

=== Data Center ===
Data Center is considered as the first TIER III, ISO 20000 and ISO 27001 certified data center both in Azerbaijan and South Caucasus. The center was established by AzInTelecom LLC on the base of the Ministry of Transport, Communications and High Technologies in 2016.

The work level of the data center is 99.982%. Servers in the center are under sustainable control for 24 hours and seven days a week.

Total area of the Data Center is over 700 square meters, where data transfer is carried out at high speed.

=== Azerspace-1 ===
The first satellite of Azerbaijan, Azerspace-1 was launched into orbit on February 7, 2013, at 18:36 (on February 8, 2013, at 01:36 Baku time) from the Kourou cosmodrome situated in South America. The satellite was developed by the American company Orbital Sciences.

In 2014, approximately 100 television and 20 radio channels were broadcast via the satellite.

=== Azerbaijani Cybersecurity Center ===
The Ministry created the Azerbaijan Cybersecurity Center with the support of PASHA Holding and cooperation with Technion – Israel Institute of Technology.

The opening took place on March 28, 2023. The event was attended by Ali Naghiyev, Rashad Nabiyev; Gabi Ashkenazi, Boaz Golani, as well as representatives from the Israeli Embassy and other government officials.

The ministry has stated that the center's objective is to provide training to over 1,000 individuals within a span of three years. The center also plans to develop cybersecurity experts by initially training 15 trainers.

=== Twinning ===
On October 7, 2022, the twinning project focused on "Strengthening road safety in Azerbaijan" started with the support of the European Neighbourhood Instrument. The project is expected to have active participation from the Ministry of Internal Affairs, Science and Education, Healthcare, and other related institutions.

=== Technest Scholarship ===
Technest is a national scholarship program in the field of ICT established under the Innovation and Digital Development Agency. In the year 2021, Technest provided scholarships to 671 individuals, in 2022 the number increased to 782, and in 2023 a significant jump was observed with 4006 people receiving scholarships.

=== Government cloud ===
On June 3, 2019, the President of Azerbaijan Ilham Aliyev signed a decree "On measures in the field of creation of the Government cloud (G-cloud) and provision of cloud services". The Ministry is appointed as the operator of G-Cloud.

As of 28 February 2024, 110 state institutions in Azerbaijan have transferred their information systems to the G-cloud.

=== Other ===
In addition, among the projects of the ministry is "Caucasus Ventures", the first venture fund in Azerbaijan. It was created with the participation of the ministry, PASHA Holding and individual investors.

== See also ==
- Cabinet of Azerbaijan
- Telecommunications in Azerbaijan
- State Fund for Development of IT
