= American University of Malta =

Liberal arts college in Malta

- L-Università Amerikana ta’ Malta
- Motto: There is no greater gift the present can give to the future than a new generation of talented and inspired leaders
- Type: Private
- Established: 16 September 2016; 9 years ago
- Founder: Hani H. N. Salah
- Parent institution: Sadeen Education Investment Ltd
- President: Prof. Ian Robson
- Provost: Prof. Jim R. Bozeman
- Students: 143 (October 2019)
- Location: Triq Dom Mintoff, Cospicua, BML 1013, Malta; 35°52′55″N 14°31′11.2″E
- Campus: Urban
- Language: English
- Nickname: AUM Knights
- Website: www.aum.edu.mt

The American University of Malta (AUM) is a private institution offering American-style liberal arts education, located in Cospicua, Malta. Announced in May 2015, the university was introduced as part of a broader initiative aimed at supporting the economic and social development of southern Malta. Following the announcement, Dock 1 in Cospicua was selected as the main campus site, with additional locations proposed in Cospicua and Żonqor, Marsaskala. The university was officially established on 16 September 2016.

The AUM admitted its first cohort of students in September 2017, during the restoration of its main campus. The restoration was completed in January 2019, followed by the university's official inauguration ceremony in March 2019.

== History ==
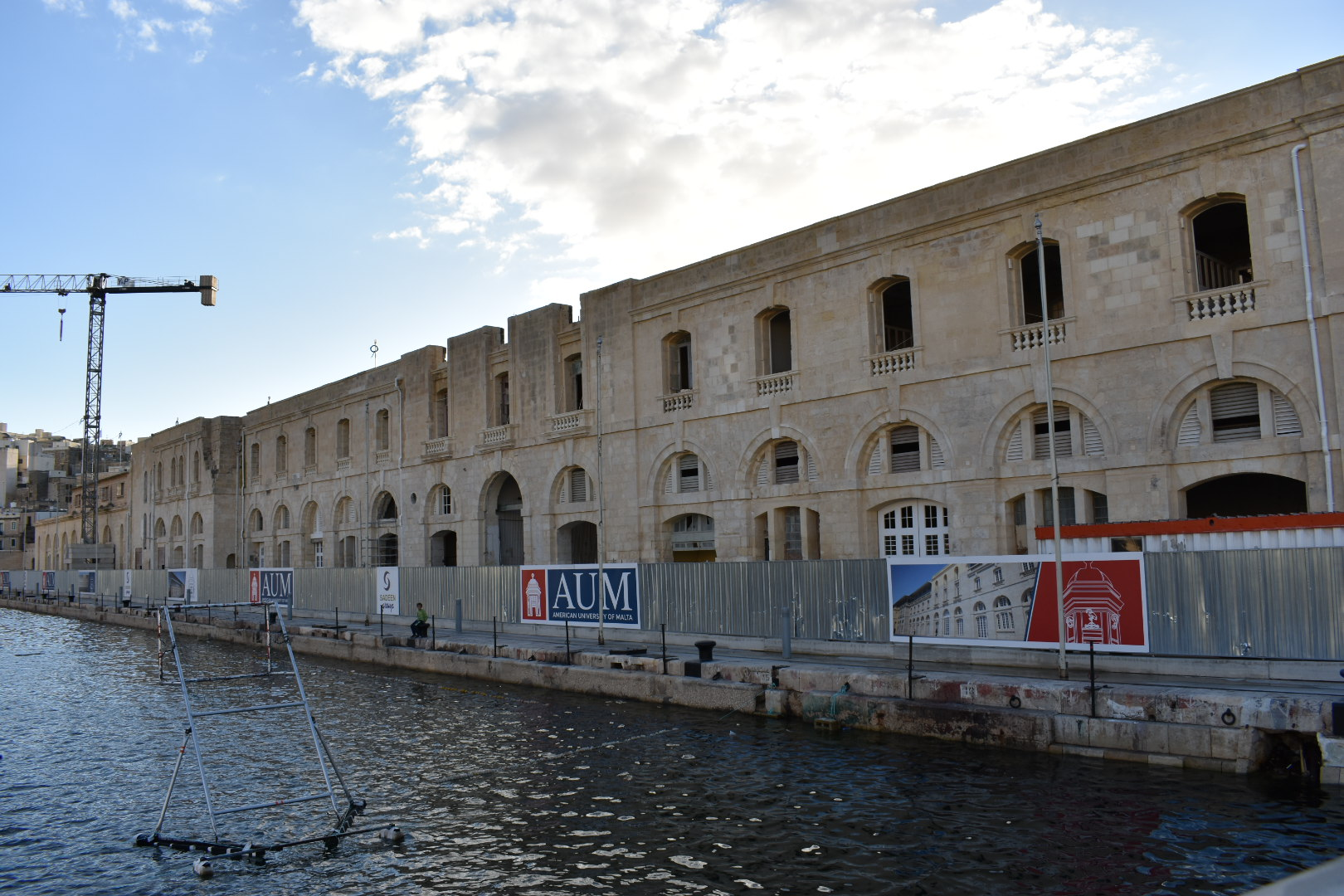
The British Building, renamed as Sadeen Building, in Cospicua being restored to house the AUM in November 2016

On 5 May 2015, Jordanian entrepreneur Hani Salah signed an agreement with the Government of Malta at the Auberge de Castille to establish a private educational institution called the American University of Malta (AUM). Initially, the university was planned to be located in Spain; however, then-Prime Minister of Malta, encouraged Hani Salah, owner of Sadeen, to establish the university in Malta.

The National Commission for Further and Higher Education (NCFHE) officially accredited the AUM on 30 June 2016, after a 14-month process that included financial and academic evaluations. DePaul University provided the original curricula of the AUM.

In January 2016, John Ryder was appointed as the Provost and Acting Vice President of AUM. Ryder's background includes a terminal degree in Philosophy and two years as president of Khazar University in Azerbaijan. AUM's goal was to accommodate up to 4,000 students, primarily from the Middle East, North Africa, and Europe. Although initial recruitment targets were adjusted, the university aims to establish schools in business, architecture and design, engineering, arts, sciences, and information technology.

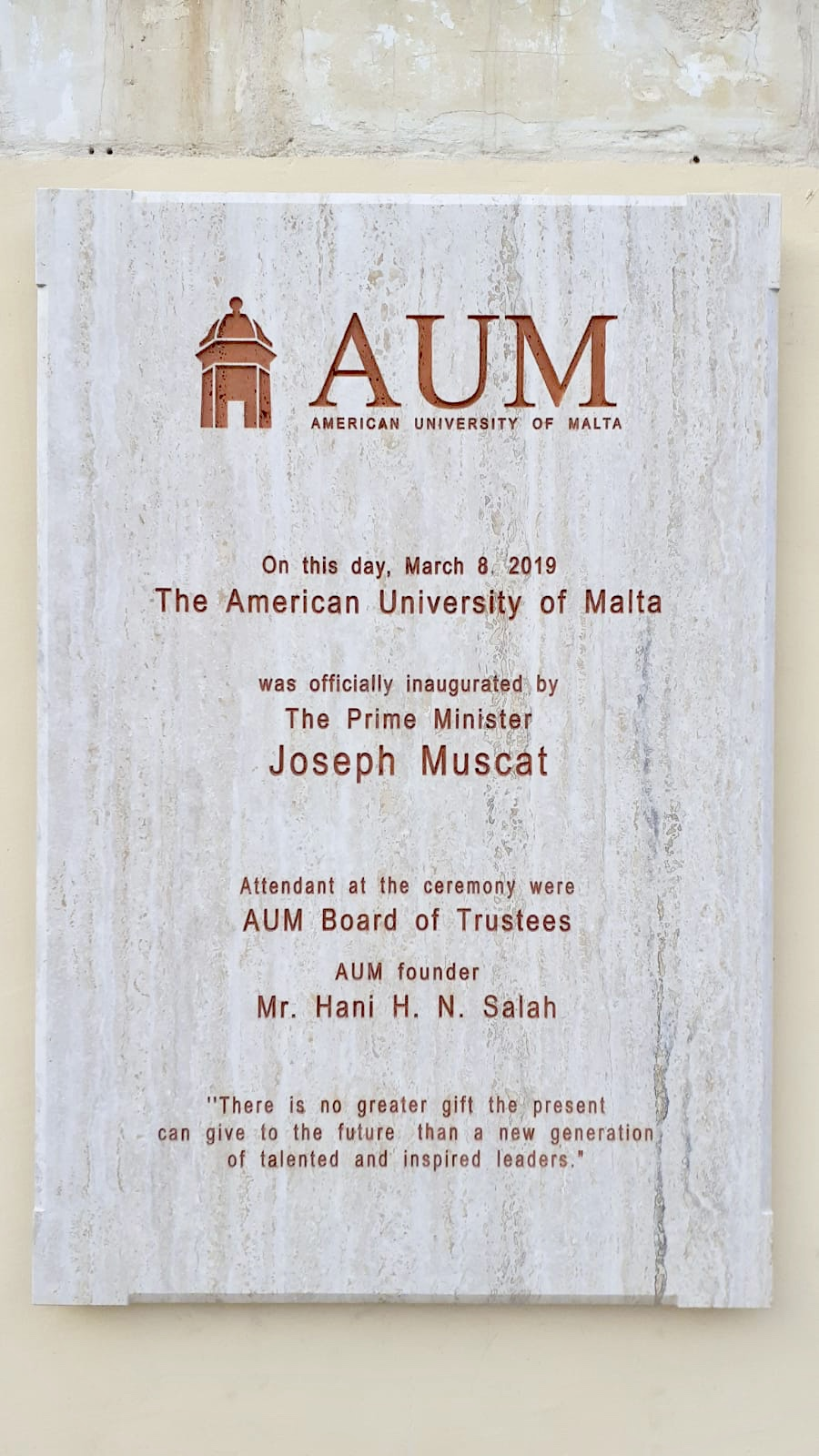
Inauguration plaque

DePaul University's involvement included providing the curriculum framework, with no financial or staffing commitments. Khaled El Zayyat, a former DePaul administrator, joined AUM as its first Vice President of Global Initiatives. El Zayyat, who had previously overseen graduate programs at DePaul, was responsible for hiring IT staff at AUM. Following the departure of an IT Administrator, David Aquilina, who had worked under El Zayyat, Aquilina was later employed by the Maltese government in a similar role.

The university was originally intended to create a social and economic boost to localities in the South Eastern Region of Malta, which is regarded as being less developed than the rest of the island. The project has an investment of over €115 million, and it was intended to create around 400 to 750 jobs. The project's estimated economic output was speculated to be about €48 to €85 million. As of September 2016, demand for property in Cospicua reportedly increased as a result of the university project. Concerns have been expressed about the potential impact of the university on the heritage and quality of life in the Bormla community and the Three Cities region.

The university originally planned to take in its first students in October 2016, with lectures at SmartCity Malta until the head campus was completed. The beginning of the first academic year was later moved to 28 August 2017, with lectures held at the Dock No. 1 campus in Cospicua.

=== Accreditation and licensing ===
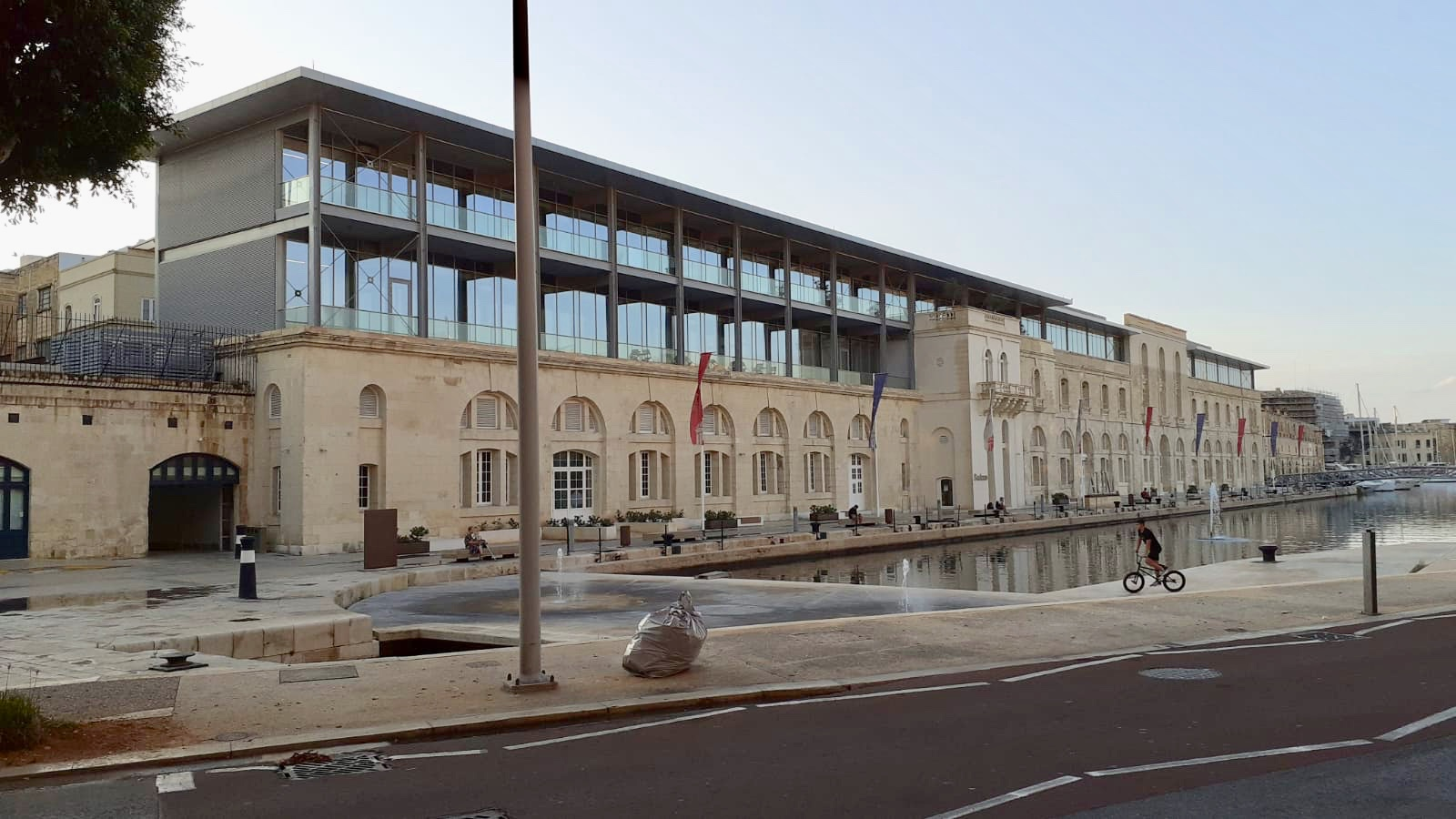
Sadeen Building in 2020

In December 2015, Leader of the Opposition Simon Busuttil stated that, given AUM's application as a 'Higher Education Institution,' its promotion as a 'University' was inappropriate. In January 2016, the National Commission for Further and Higher Education announced that Sadeen Education Investment Ltd had been given a licence to operate a Higher Education Institution under the name American Institute of Malta. This was the first step in the process to acquire a university licence. The commission has stated that a degree issued by the American Institute would have the same value as one issued by the University of Malta.

However, on 11 March 2016, Sadeen Education Investment Ltd was notified by a judicial letter that licensed higher education institutions are prohibited from using the word "university" in their advertising and publicity, unless they have been granted that status formally. On 6 May 2016, Economy Minister Chris Cardona said that he had "no doubt that this will be a University and not an institute. This is part of a process, but the project will result in a University".

The National Commission for Further and Higher Education (NCFHE) officially accredited the AUM on 30 June 2016, after a 14-month process which included financial and academic evaluations. The commission imposed a number of conditions on the AUM, including an annual audit by the Clemson University. Sadeen asked for a compromise on these conditions, but the commission insisted that they were not negotiable. After the conditions were accepted, the commission issued a 5-year university licence on 16 September 2016.

== Campuses ==
As of 2020, the American University of Malta operates from a renovated building at Dock no. 1 in Cospicua. Plans have been made to extend the campus into nearby buildings in Cospicua, with an additional proposed campus at Żonqor Point in Marsaskala. The latter was originally intended to be the university's primary location, but on 20 August 2015 it was announced that the Maltese government and Sadeen Group had agreed to split the university campus between the two sites.

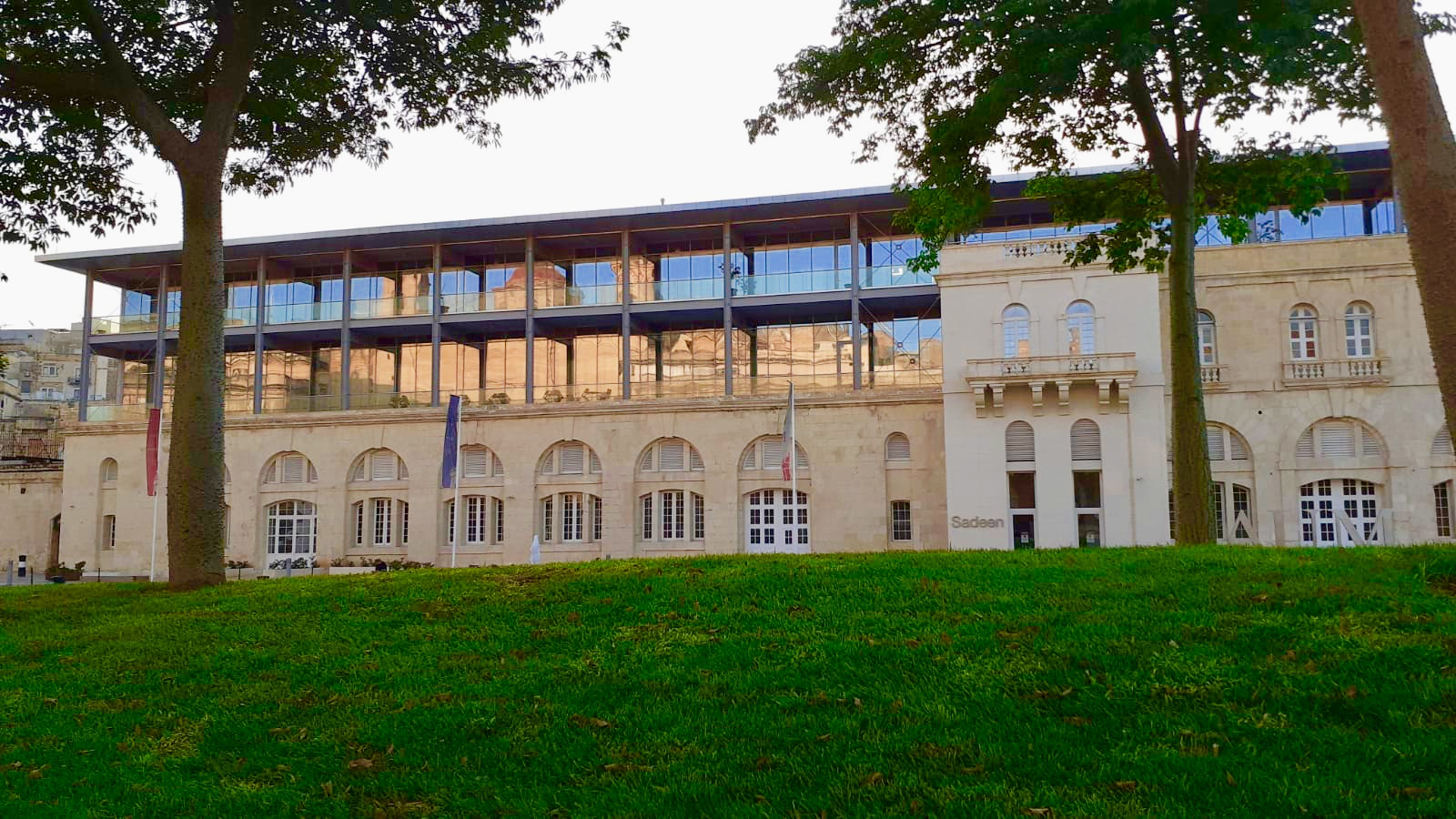
Modern extension, mostly visible on the left side of the British Building

The government has leased land in Cospicua and Żonqor to Sadeen Group for approximately €200,000 per year. The government approved the granting of land for the AUM after a 15-hour long debate in parliament on 15 December 2015.

=== Cospicua campus ===
==== British Building (Sadeen Building) ====
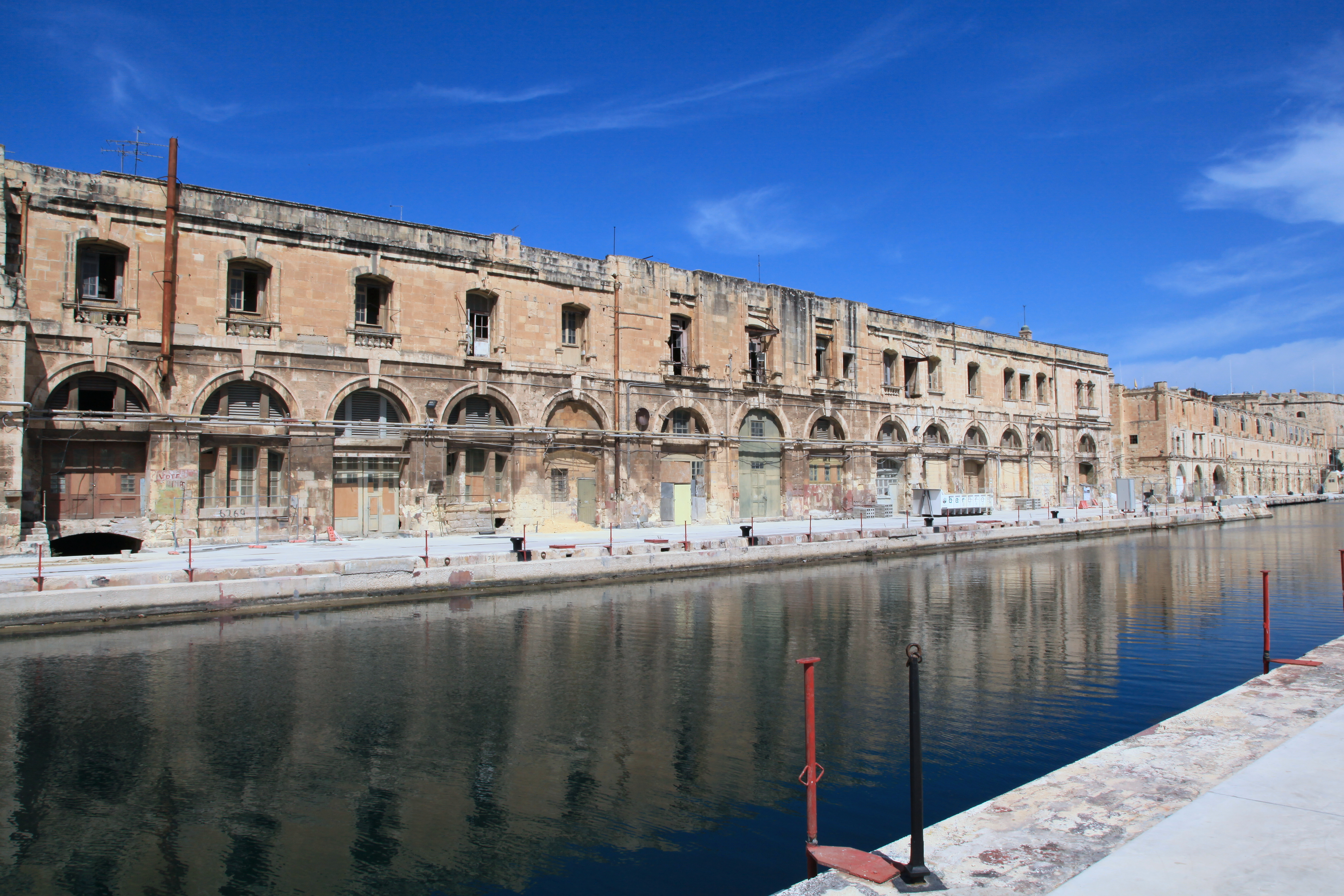
The British Building in 2014, before restoration

The British Building was built between 1841 and 1844 as a workshop within Dock no. 1, which was being constructed for the British Royal Navy. Its architect was William Scamp, who also designed the rest of the dockyard, and some alterations were carried out in the late 19th and early 20th centuries. The building was damaged by aerial bombardment during World War II, and repairs and alterations made after the war were unsympathetic to the building's aesthetics. An almost identical building which was located on the opposite side of the dry dock was demolished between 1972 and 1974. This is regarded as destruction of cultural heritage, but it led to the creation of an open space which was rehabilitated and opened to the public in 2014.

The Planning Authority approved the restoration of the building to house part of the AUM campus on 25 August 2016. The renovation was carried out by Edwin Mintoff Architects between November 2016 and March 2019, and the project included conservation of the existing building, reconstruction of the parts which were destroyed during the war as well as the construction of an intermediate level and additional floors with a contemporary glass-and-steel design. The conversion of the building won the Golden A' Design Award in February 2020. The building is now known as the Sadeen Building, and it houses the university's lecture halls, laboratories, administrative facilities and library.

==== Knights' Building and proposed extensions ====
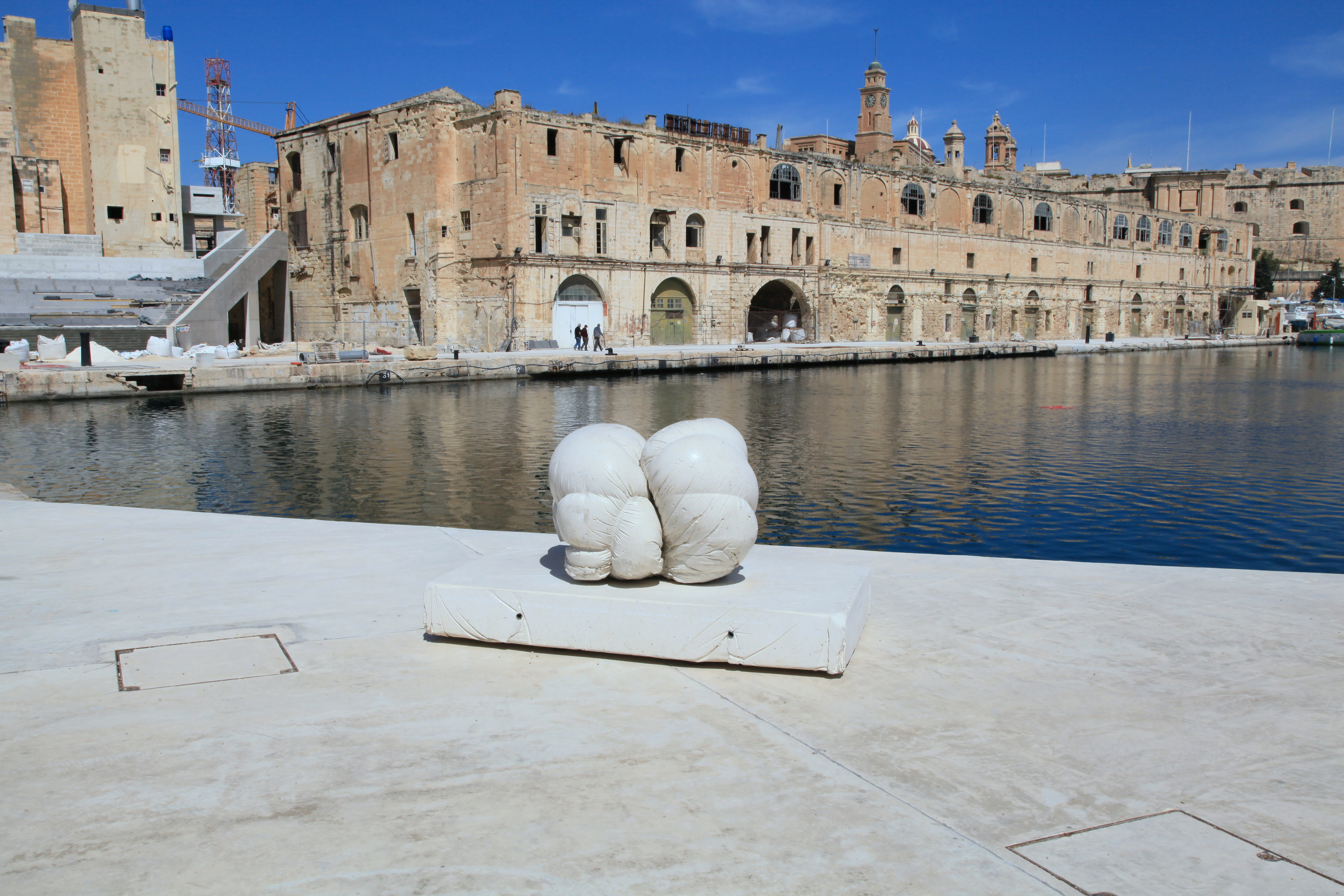
The Knights' Building in 2014

The Knights' Building was commissioned by Adrien de Wignacourt, Grand Master of the Order of St John, in 1689. In 1776, arcades were built over the existing building by Grand Master Emmanuel de Rohan-Polduc. When Malta was under British rule, the building's upper level was used as a sail loft and ropery. It was also damaged during World War II and it remained in a dilapidated state. Plans to restore the Knights' Building to house part of the AUM were announced in 2016, and the renovation was originally planned to be complete by 2017–18.

The project, which was also entrusted to Edwin Mintoff Architects, was to include alterations to the Knights' Building which consisted of the demolition of parts of its interior as well as the construction of an additional floor and a new wing. In addition, new buildings were to be constructed on nearby sites: an administrative building was to be built between the British and Knights' Buildings, and a building which housed student accommodation and a multistorey car park was to be built on the site of a nearby public car park.

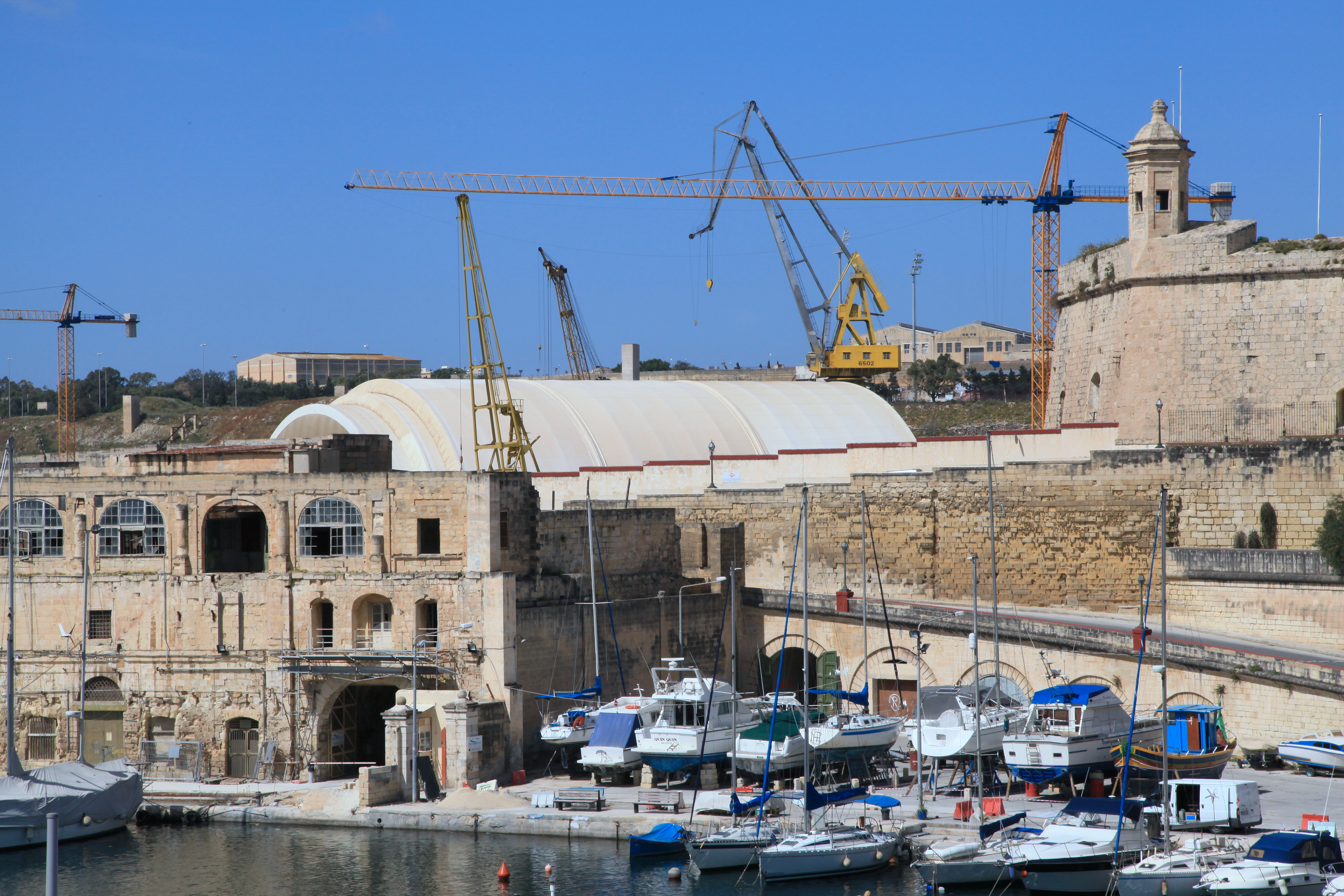
The Knights' Building (left), the site of the proposed new wing (centre) and the Senglea fortifications (right) in 2014

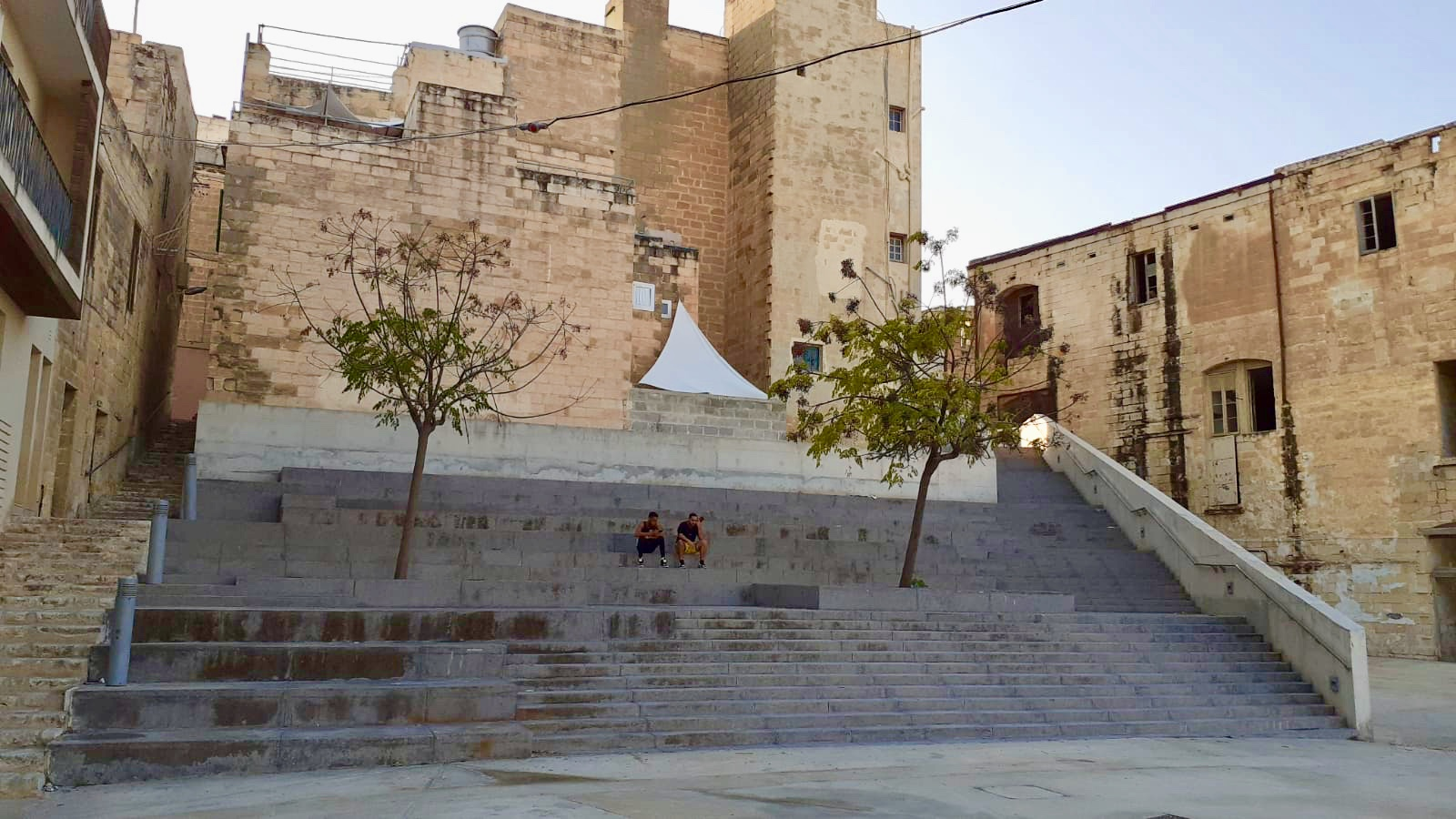
The stairs area between the two historic buildings

This proposal was opposed by local residents, the Nationalist Party, the Democratic Party, the Catholic Church and various NGOs. A group of residents from the Cottonera area formed the civil action group Azzjoni: Tuna Artna Lura (Maltese for Action: Give Us Back Our Land) which held protests and petitioned against the proposal. Opposition to the project was mainly because public open spaces would have been built up, and the proposed extensions would have obstructed views of the Senglea fortifications from Cospicua. The NGO Flimkien għal Ambjent Aħjar was also opposed to the internal demolition of the Knights' Building, and it stated that the project would have a negative impact on the quality of life of Cottonera residents. There were also concerns relating to the project's potential impact on traffic and parking spaces, and that the project was unnecessary given the small number of students enrolled at the AUM, with some residents being concerned that the proposed student accommodation would be converted into a hotel. Other critics of the extension included Yana Mintoff and Labour Party MP Glenn Bedingfield; the latter was opposed to the accommodation which would have a swimming pool on the roof.

On 26 September 2019, the Planning Authority board announced that it will reject the proposed extension to the university, citing the need to preserve cultural heritage, maintain public open space and ensure the continued view of the fortifications. The formal refusal of planning permission was made on 21 November 2019. Sadeen Group decided to appeal this decision, and the case is still ongoing as of 2020.

=== Proposed campus at Żonqor Point ===
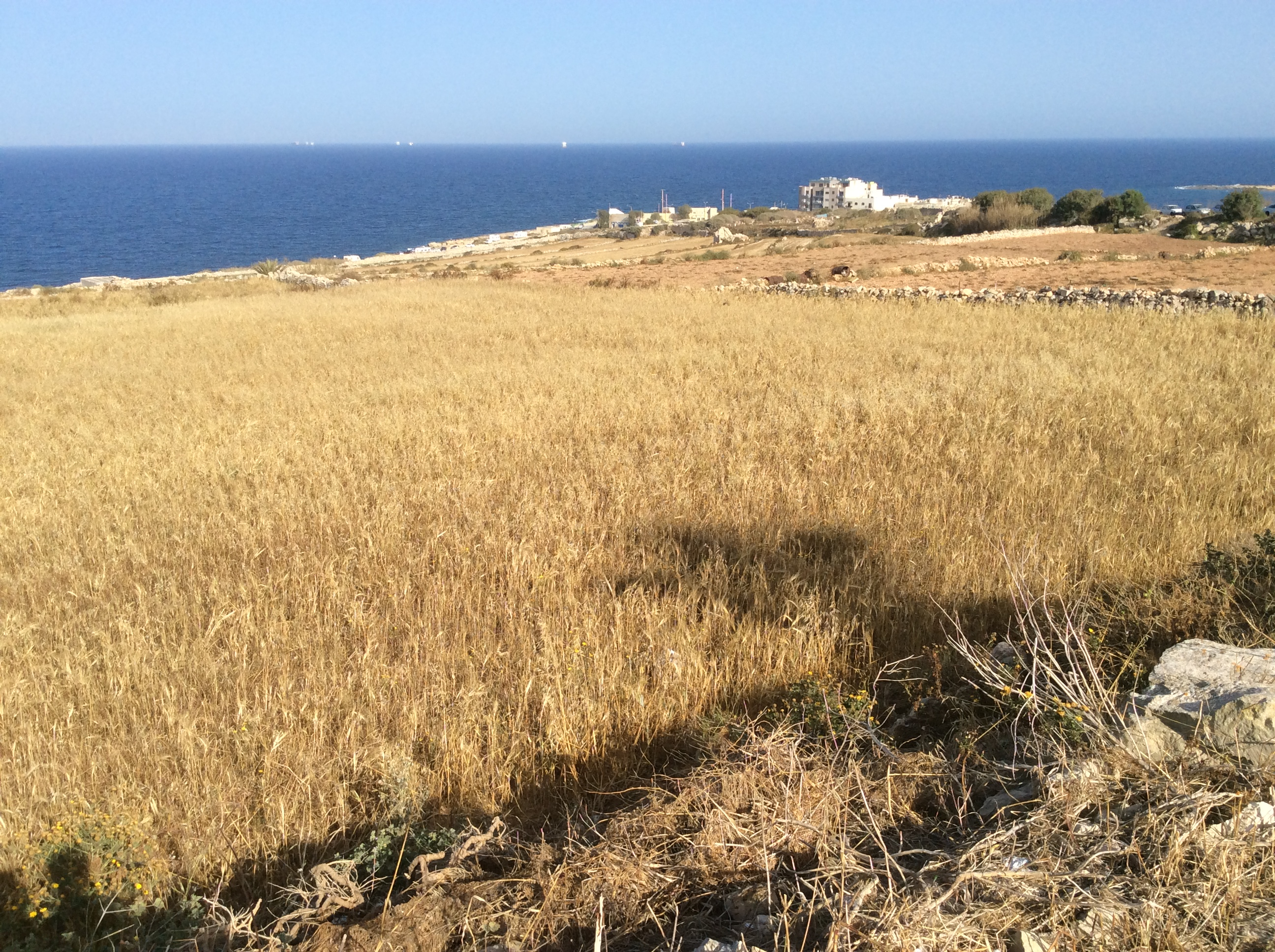
Żonqor Point, where the AUM campus was meant to be built

When the university project was announced in May 2015, the government offered Sadeen Group 90,000 m^{2} (970,000 sq ft) of Outside Development Zone (ODZ) land near Żonqor Point in Marsaskala on which to build the university. A natural park, partially funded by the university, would be set up nearby. An early proposal also included the incorporation of the 19th-century Fort Leonardo into the university campus. Prime Minister Joseph Muscat stated that constructing the university in Marsaskala would pressure the owners of the former Jerma Palace Hotel to redevelop the site, which has fallen into disrepair since being closed down in 2007.

The proposal to use ODZ land raised concerns among environmentalists, and multiple NGOs, the Alternattiva Demokratika (AD) political party, the Malta Developers Association, and the Church spoke out against the proposal. Residents of Marsaskala and southern Malta supported the university project by signing a petition in its favour. Muscat responded to the criticism by stating that the Malta Environment and Planning Authority would consider other sites in the southern part of the island, and a public consultation process was subsequently made to select an alternative site for the university campus.

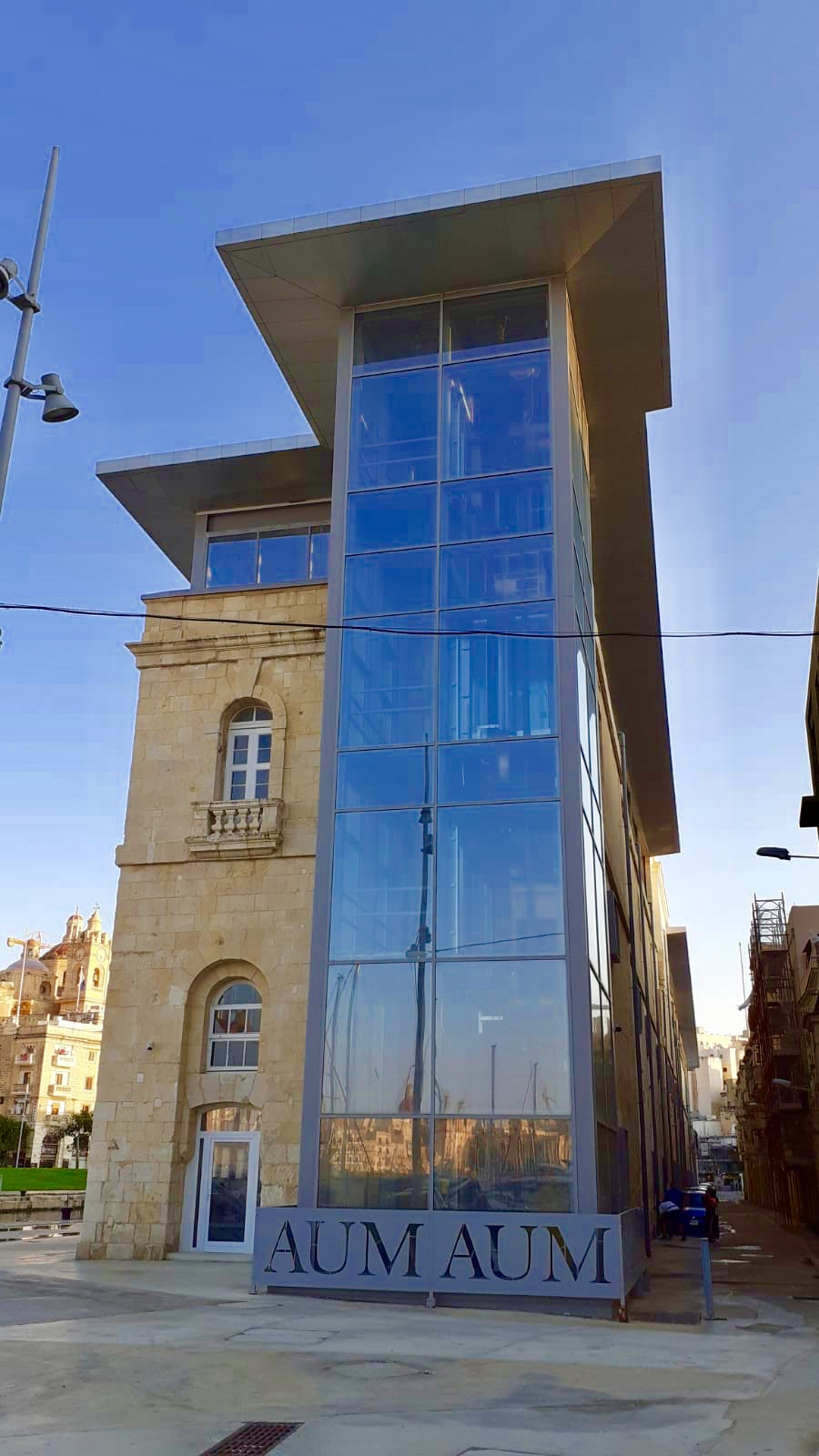
A small modern extension

Opponents of the Żonqor Point development set up the Front Ħarsien ODZ (Maltese for Front for the Protection of ODZ) on 23 May 2015, and its founding members included then-Labour MPs Marlene and Godfrey Farrugia and former AD politician Michael Briguglio. The group held a protest in Valletta against the development on 20 June, and it was attended by 3000 people. On 20 August, it was announced that the government and Sadeen Group had reached an agreement to split the university between Cospicua and a reduced site at Żonqor Point. The latter occupy the site of a water polo pitch and 18,000 m^{2} (190,000 sq ft) of adjoining ODZ fields, and it would consist of three faculties and student dormitories, with a maximum height of five stories. A new water polo pitch would also be built to replace the one demolished to make way for the university. Front Ħarsien ODZ and the University Students' Council spoke out against this proposal because it would still involve construction on ODZ land, although the former stated that it was better than the original proposal. The move was welcomed by the Cospicua Heritage Society, who said that the Three Cities and Kalkara would benefit from the project. In December 2015, Front Ħarsien ODZ criticized the government's granting of land to the university.

Sadeen Education Investment Ltd submitted a planning application to demolish the water polo pitch and construct the campus on 17 February 2017. The designs of the proposed campus are by the architect Ray Demicoli. In November 2017, after the university had started operating but had attracted significantly less students than expected, Education Minister Evarist Bartolo and Prime Minister Muscat stated that construction of the Żonqor campus would only begin once the Cospicua campus is ready and when it nears full capacity. Bartolo confirmed this once again in January 2018, and in the following month AUM President Lewis Walker stated that development at Żonqor would only begin when the university has at least 2,000 students at its Cospicua campus.

In February 2022, the title of the land at Zonqor was returned to the Government of Malta, who awarded it back to the Marsascala Aquatic Sports Club.

== Organization and administration ==
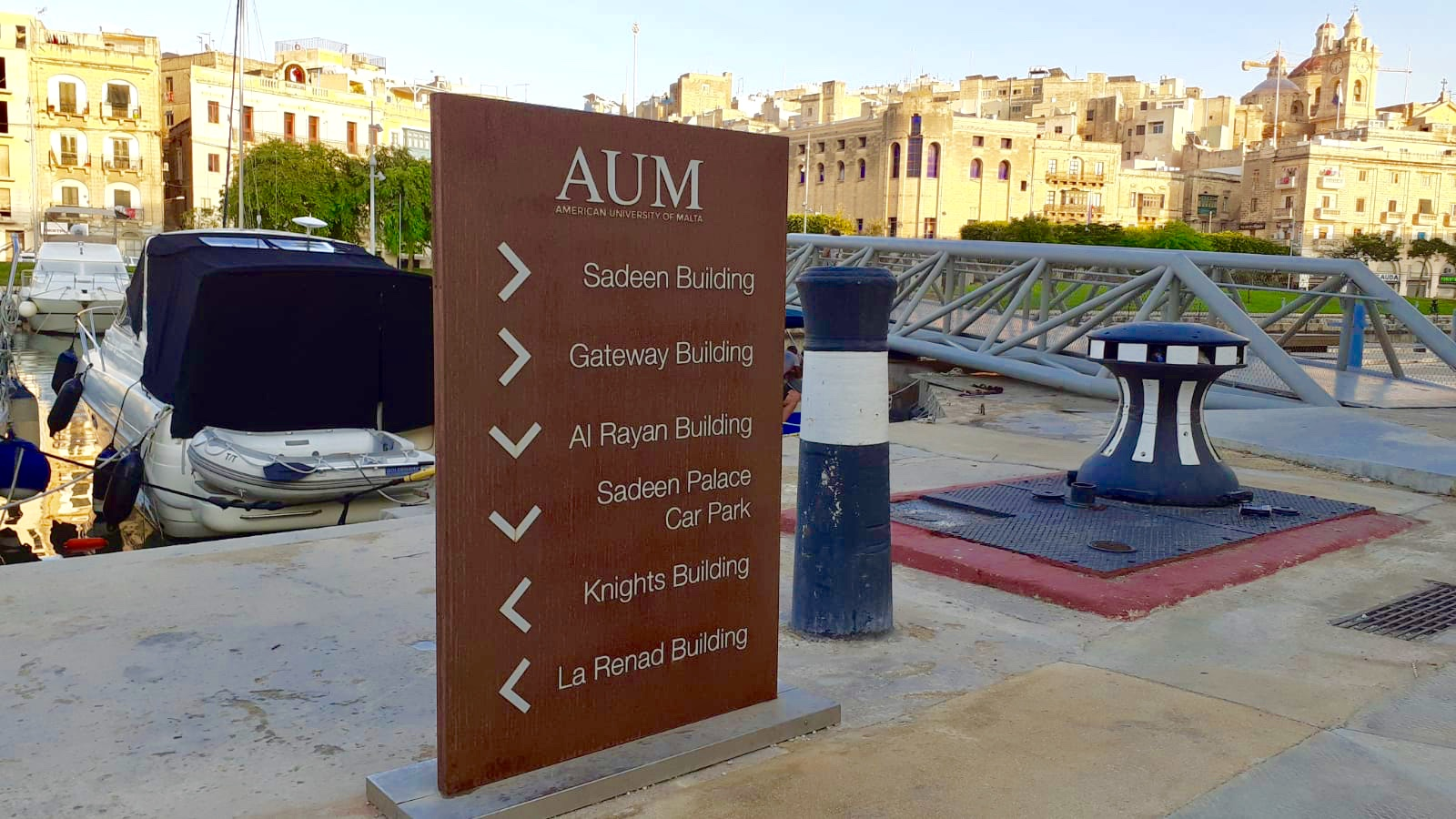
Walk path sign showing the way to the buildings on campus

As of 2022-23, the American University of Malta is governed by a board of trustees led by Prince Jean of Luxembourg as chairman and Hani Salah as vice-chairman. The university's administration is overseen by Provost Prof. Jim R. Bozeman.

As of 2023, the university has 20 faculty members.

== Academic profile ==
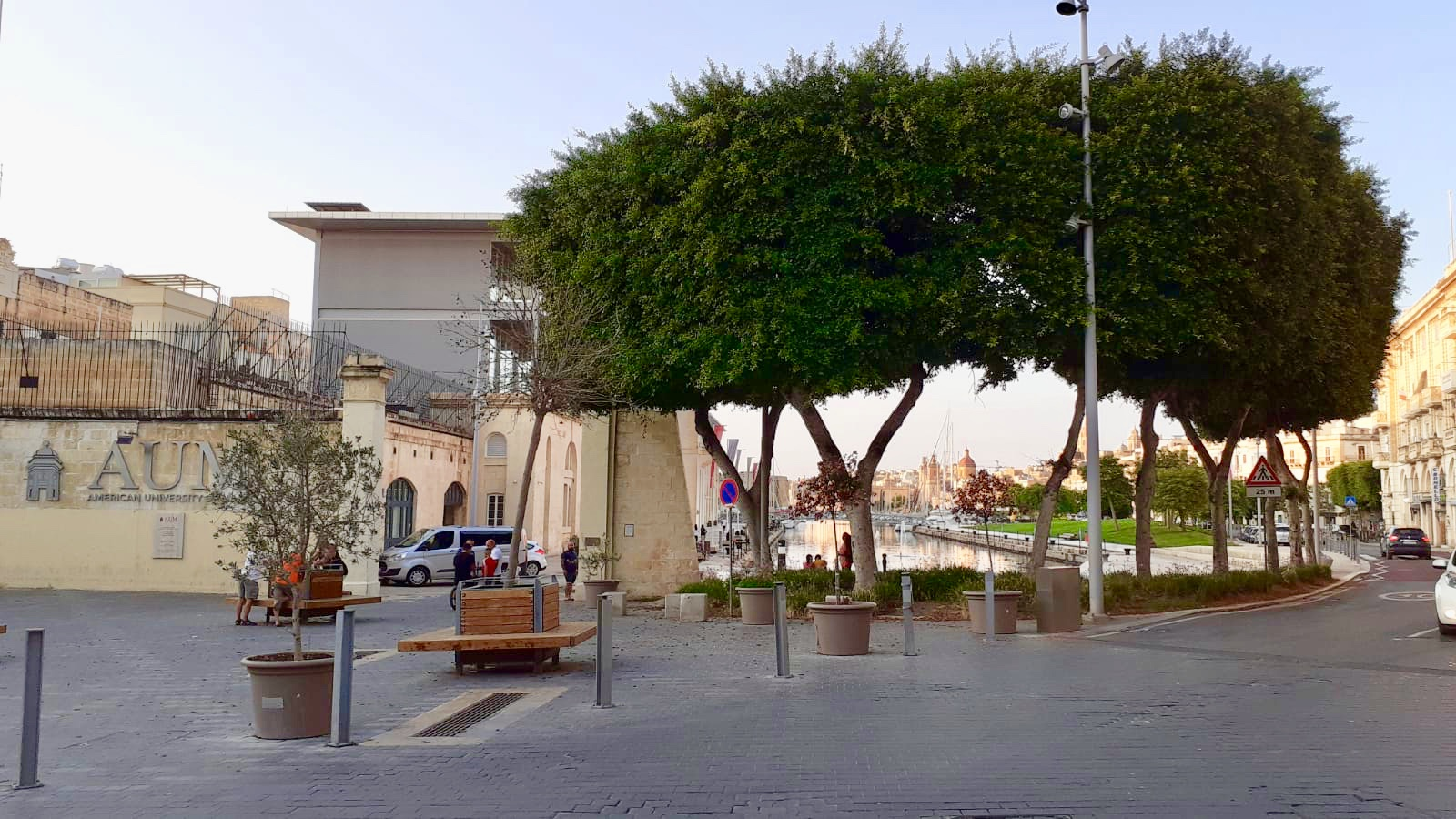
The Gateway Building on the left and Dock 1.

AUM holds a university license from the NCFHE (License Number: 2016-002). This license states that AUM is fully authorized to deliver academic degree programs at levels 6 (Bachelors), 7 (Masters), and 8 (Doctorate), according to the Malta Qualifications Framework and the European Qualification for Framework for Lifelong Learning.

AUM offers 10 undergraduate and 3 graduate degrees in the areas of Business, Engineering, Technology and Arts. The American standard for a liberal arts education combines a general and a specialized type of education. The general one focuses on a broad approach to education, while the specialized one is simply the major that takes an in-depth approach.

Students in all undergraduate academic programs at AUM must complete the General Education Program. Students are required to take a set of courses outside their major to develop their understanding of broad disciplinary areas and the connections between and among them. The General Education requirements are a total of 41–42 US/82- 84 ETCS credits.

=== Admissions ===
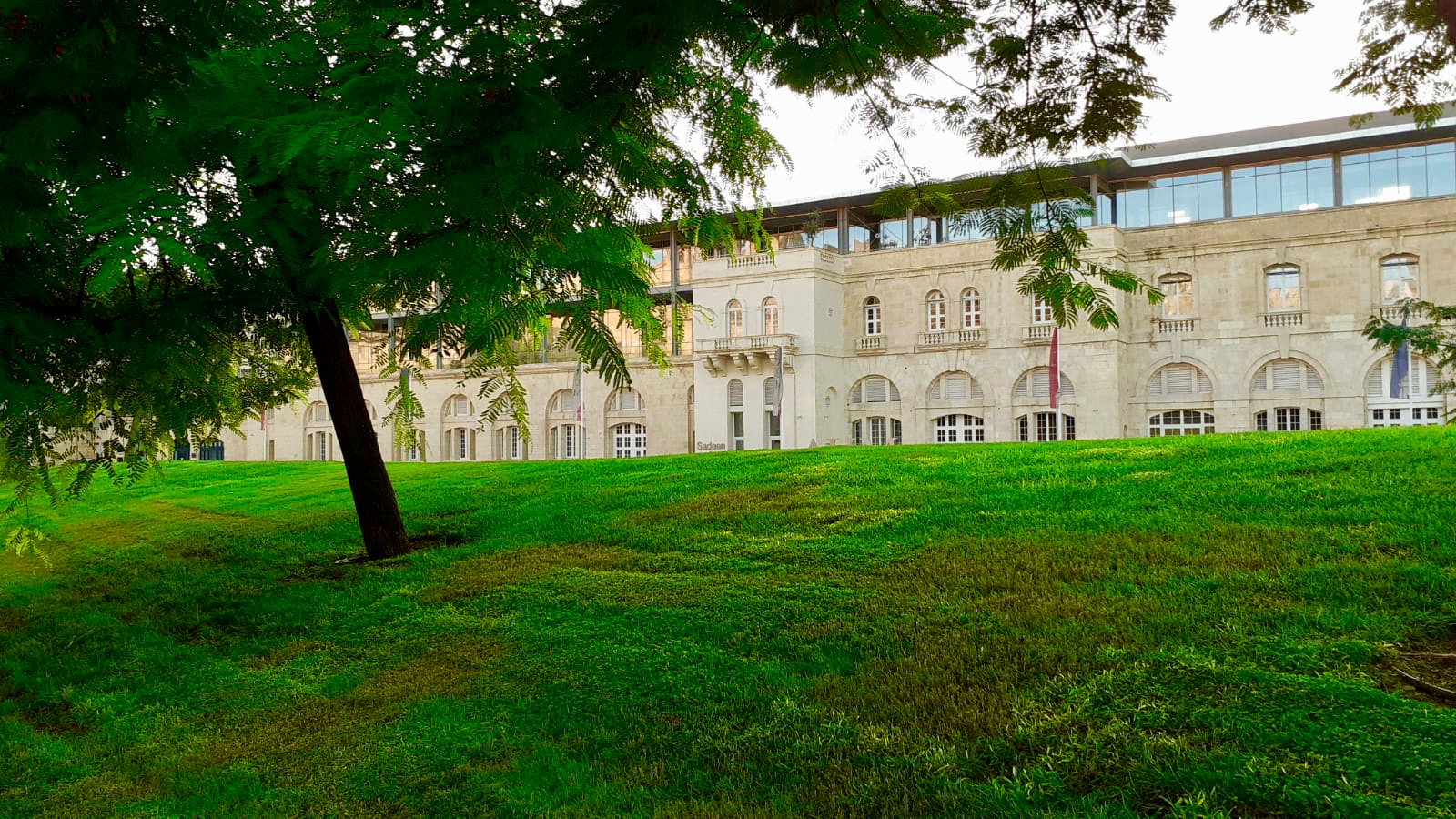
Landscape in the vicinity of the main campus

The American University of Malta is open to receiving both domestic Maltese students and international students from all over the world. All applicants can apply for their degree of choice online by submitting all the necessary documents. All programs at the AUM are taught in English. Candidates must provide proof of English proficiency to receive full admission to the university.

Candidates without the proper documentation or low proficiency may begin their studies through the English for Academic Purposes pathway program. The EAP program at the American University of Malta is designed to help students who meet all the requirements for admissions except for the language proficiency and need to improve their English language skills to begin their degree program. This program will help students improve their skills in Listening, Speaking, Reading and Writing to help them succeed once they start their degree.

== Student life ==
=== Housing ===
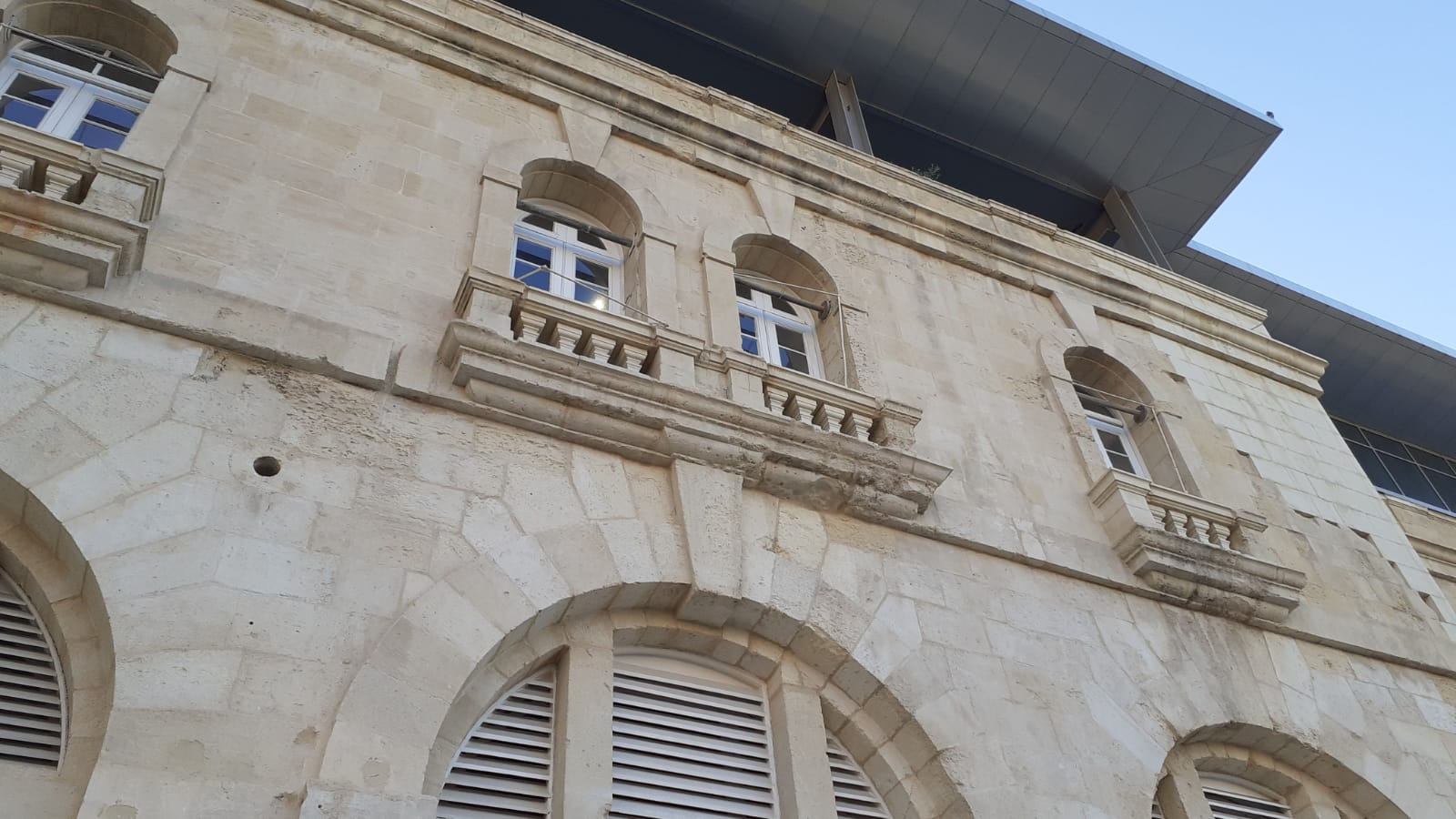
Architectural details of the British Building

The American University of Malta currently offers accommodation in apartments in Kalkara, a town located close to the campus in Cospicua. The apartments are co-ed, such that males and females can live in the same apartment but they cannot share a bedroom unless they are a married couple.

Sadeen Education Investment Ltd purchased Bowyer House, a hostel in Tarxien, to be used as the university's official student accommodation in September 2017, and this property is currently being renovated.

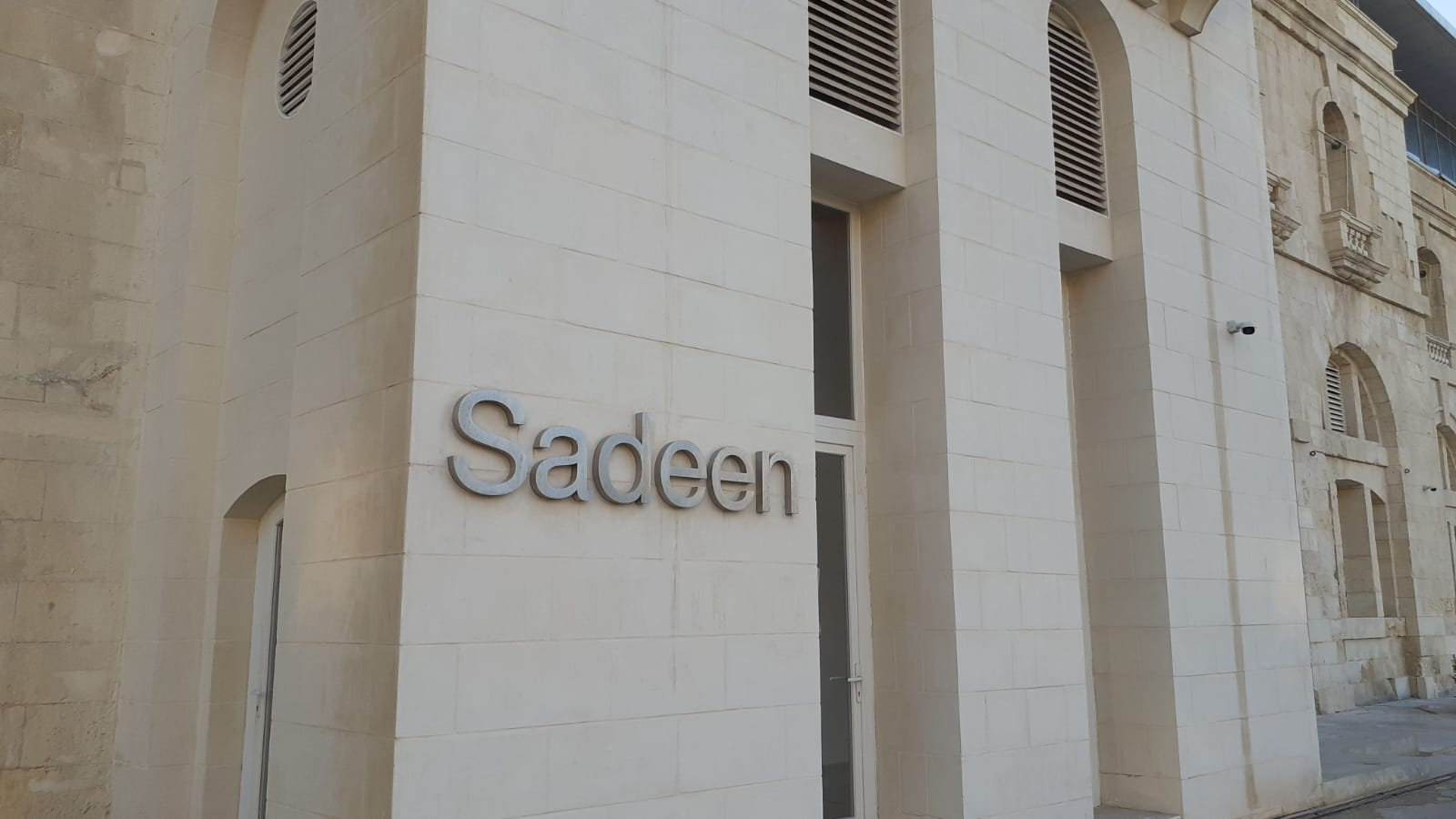
The British Building is now named for the Jordanian founder as Sadeen Building

=== Sports ===
The American University of Malta Cricket Club (AUM CC), also called the AUM Knights, is the university's cricket club, and it is approved by the Malta Cricket Association.

The university also has an esports team which is also known as the AUM Knights, and it offers esports scholarships.

== See also ==
- List of universities in Malta
- University of Malta
- Cospicua
