= Niknafs =

Niknafs is a family name. Notable people with the name include:

- Hassan Niknafs, Iranian Azerbaijani mechanical engineer and academic administrator
- Yashar Niknafs, American scientist and businessperson
- Ziaeddin Niknafs (born 1986), Iranian football defender
- Zobeir Niknafs (born 1993), Iranian football midfielder
