= John Ryder (scholar) =

American philosopher

- Born: September 29, 1951 (age 74); New York, New York
- Citizenship: United States
- Education: State University of New York
- Scientific career
- Fields: Philosophy
- Workplaces: Khazar University, State University of New York

John Ryder is a professor and former president (rector) of Khazar University in Baku, Azerbaijan. He is the former Provost at the American University of Malta.

== Education ==
He finished his bachelor's degree in May 1973 at the State University of New York (SUNY) College at Cortland, then continued his education at Stony Brook University (SUNY), receiving a master's degree in philosophy in May 1977. He became a Ph.D. candidate at the same university, and was awarded a doctorate in philosophy in August 1982.

== Positions held ==
He was a lecturer at the State University of New York (Cortland) from 1980 to 1985, then served as a professor at the same university from 1985 to 2002. He chaired the university's philosophy department from 1991 to 1996, and in 1995 to 1996 he was the co-founder and director of the Project for Eastern and Central Europe.

From 1996 to 2002, he served in the role of dean of the School of Arts and Sciences of the State University of New York (Cortland). He was the leader of 16 academic departments and 3 centers in which 160 faculty provided academic programs to 1700 students.

From 2002 to 2010, Ryder was the director of the Center on Russia and the United States. The center implemented various exchange and dual-degree programs for undergraduate and graduate students between the State University of New York and Moscow and St. Petersburg State Universities, Moscow State Institute of International Relations and other Russian universities.

In February 2002 he also became the director of the State University of New York Office of International Programs. The office, the main aim of which is to develop cooperative relationships with institutes around the world, was notably successful in planning and implementing dual-degree programs with higher education institutions in Turkey, Russia, China, Mexico and other countries.

In September 2010, Ryder was appointed to the position of rector of Khazar University. Ryder left Khazar at the end of his two-year term.

In July 2012, Ryder was appointed Provost and Deputy Vice Chancellor of Academic Affairs at the American University of Ras Al Khaimah (AURAK).

In January 2016 Ryder was named as head of the American University of Malta. In January 2018, while serving as provost of the American University of Malta, Ryder presided over the firing of all 13 of the faculty who were still in their probation period just weeks before the second semester began. Brian Leiter referred to Ryder as the “axeman” because of his significant role in this controversial decision. Weeks later he hired two replacement faculty who jeopardized the institution's accreditation, one a proven plagiarist and the other a holder of fraudulent credentials.

In July 2019, Ryder announced that he had decided to retire and would therefore resign from his position as provost of the AUM, stating that he had fulfilled the terms of his contract, but would have "loved not to have had some of the problems or [made some of the] mistakes" he did.
