= Ministry of Defense Industry =

Ministry of Defense Industry may refer to:

- Ministry of Defence Industry of Azerbaijan, an Azerbaijani government department
- Ministry of Defense Industry (Soviet Union), a Soviet government department
