= Madat Guliyev =

Colonel-General National Hero of Azerbaijan Madat Guliyev
- Mədət Quliyev
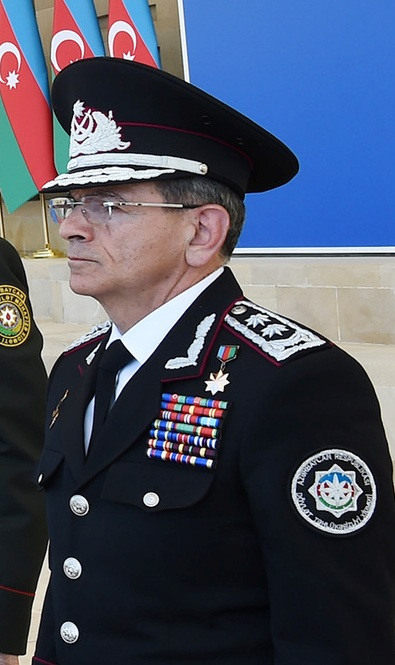
- Guliyev in 2017

Deputy Secretary of the Security Council of Azerbaijan
- Incumbent
- Assumed office 18 November 2023
- President: Ilham Aliyev
- Secretary: Ramil Usubov

Minister of Defence Industry
- In office 20 June 2019 – 18 November 2023
- President: Ilham Aliyev
- Prime Minister: Novruz Mammadov; Ali Asadov
- Preceded by: Yavar Jamalov
- Succeeded by: Vugar Mustafayev

Chief of the State Security Service
- In office 14 December 2015 – 20 June 2019
- President: Ilham Aliyev
- Prime Minister: Artur Rasizade; Novruz Mammadov
- Succeeded by: Ali Naghiyev

Deputy Minister of National Security
- In office 20 October 2015 – 14 December 2015
- President: Ilham Aliyev

First Deputy Minister of Justice
- In office 14 February 2011 – 20 October 2015
- President: Ilham Aliyev

Personal details
- Born: 27 September 1958 (age 68) Kirovabad, Azerbaijan SSR, Soviet Union (now Ganja, Azerbaijan)
- Citizenship: Azerbaijan
- Party: Non-partisan

Military service
- Rank: Colonel General

Madat Gazanfar oglu Guliyev (born 27 September 1958) is a National Hero of Azerbaijan, a martial artist, and a politician serving as Deputy Secretary of the Security Council of Azerbaijan since 2023. Guliyev previously served as the Minister of Defense Industry of Azerbaijan from 2019 to 2023, Chief of State Security Service of the Republic of Azerbaijan (2015–2019), the Head of the Penitentiary Service and the Deputy Minister of Justice (2011–2015). Guliyev has been wounded twice in the line of duty.

== Early life ==
Guliyev Madat Gazanfar oglu was born on September 27, 1958, in Ganja. His grandfather, Madat Mashadi Karam oglu Gulubayli (1889–1930), held the position of Chief of the Ganja City Police Department but was assassinated on November 28, 1930, as part of the Stalinist Repressions. Guliyev's father, Gazanfar Madat oglu Guliyev (1923–2013), was an engineer and Guliyev's mother, Zambag Necef qizi Eminbayli (1935–2023), was a scholar of Azerbaijani language and literature.

== Education ==
In 1965, Guliyev enrolled in secondary school #1 in Ganja and successfully completed his education at school #7 in 1975. In 1974, he participated as a member of Azerbaijan's National Judo Team. In 1978, Guliyev achieved the esteemed title of "Master of Sports of the USSR" in Judo and Sambo, and he obtained a 7th Dan black belt in Karate. He graduated from the Azerbaijan State Institute of Physical Training and Sport in 1980 and later pursued a law degree from the Police Academy of the Ministry of Internal Affairs of the Republic of Azerbaijan, which he completed in 1997. He also graduated from the Louisiana State Police Training Academy.

== Career ==
In 1983, Guliyev joined the Ministry of Internal Affairs of the Azerbaijani SSR. From 1992 to 1994, he held the position of Chief of the Combat Terrorism and Banditism Department. During this time, in 1993, he was shot during an encounter but continued with the operation, successfully neutralizing the criminals.

From 1994 to 1995, Guliyev served as the Chief of the Yevlakh-Gazakh Regional Department of the Combat Organized Crimes Directorate of the Ministry of Internal Affairs. In this role, he eradicated all Organized Crime Units (OCUs) and put an end to racketeering in Azerbaijan.

Between 2001 and 2002, he served as the Chief of Combat Organized Crimes and Racketeering.

From 2002 to 2004, Guliyev served as the Chief of Combat Narcotics in the Chief Directorate of the Ministry of Internal Affairs.

== High posts ==
From 2004 to 2006, Guliyev served as the Chief of Azerbaijan's National Central Bureau of Interpol. Between 2006 and 2011, he held the position of Chief of the Main Security Directorate of the Ministry of Internal Affairs. In 2011, Guliyev was appointed Deputy Minister of Justice and Chief of the Penitentiary Service of the Republic of Azerbaijan. He was made a Lieutenant General of Justice on 20 November 2012.

In 2015, he was appointed Deputy Minister of National Security and served as the acting Minister of National Security.

From 2015 to 2019, Guliyev served as the Chief of the State Security Agency. He was made a Colonel General on 26 September 2018. In 2019, he was appointed as the Minister of Defence Industry by a presidential decree dated June 20.

On November 18, 2023, he was dismissed from the position of Minister of Defense Industry of the Republic of Azerbaijan by the order of the President. By another order of the same day, he was appointed deputy secretary of the Security Council of the Republic of Azerbaijan.

== Personal life ==
He serves as Vice President of the Azerbaijan Automobile Federation and President of the Azerbaijan Cycling Federation since 2021. Guliyev is married and has four children. He is fluent in Russian, English, German and Turkish.

== Awards ==
The following are his more notable awards:

- National Hero of Azerbaijan - 26 December 1995, for exceptional merit and bravery in defence and strengthening of the Republic of Azerbaijan
- 3rd Degree For service to the Fatherland Order, 3rd Degree (20 November 2014)
- For service to the Fatherland Order, 2nd Degree (26 March 2018)
- European Service Order (2022)
- Atatürk International Award (2022)
- Medal of the Security and Intelligence Department of the Republic of Croatia.

Awards list
Azerbaijan

USSR

== See also ==
- Eldar Mahmudov
- President of Azerbaijan
