= List of universities in Malta =

This is a partial list of universities and colleges in the Republic of Malta. Tertiary education in Malta is divided into public and private universities as well as vocational schools. Private universities include locally established universities and campuses of foreign universities. Since January 2021, the overview of licensed institutions and accredited course, previously offered by NCFHE (National Commission for Further and Higher Education), is offered and maintained by MFHEA (Malta Further & Higher Education Authority).

== Public university ==
- University of Malta, Msida

== Private universities ==
- London School of Commerce, Valletta
- American University of Malta, Cospicua
- Barts and the London School of Medicine and Dentistry, Victoria
- European Graduate School, Valletta
- Global College Malta, SmartCity, Kalkara
- Triagon Academy, Valletta
- Signum Magnum College, Portomaso, Malta
- South Europe College

== Higher education institutes (HEI) ==
- College of Remote and Offshore Medicine (CoROM)
- EDU International Institute of Higher Education, Kalkara
- EIMS (European Institute for Medical Studies) Higher Education Institution, St. Julian's
- GBSB Global Business School, Birkirkara
- Institute of Tourism Studies (ITS), Luqa and Qala
- London School of Commerce, Floriana
- Malta College of Arts, Science and Technology, Paola
- Malta Institute of Taxation, Attard
- Open Institute of Technology
- Pegaso International HEI (in cooperation with Università degli Studi Pegaso, Naples, Italy), Kalkara
- St. Martin's Institute of Higher Education, Hamrun
- Zerah Business School, Floriana
- GIOYA Higher Education Institution, San Ġwann
