= Hassan Niknafs =

Iranian Azerbaijani academic administrator

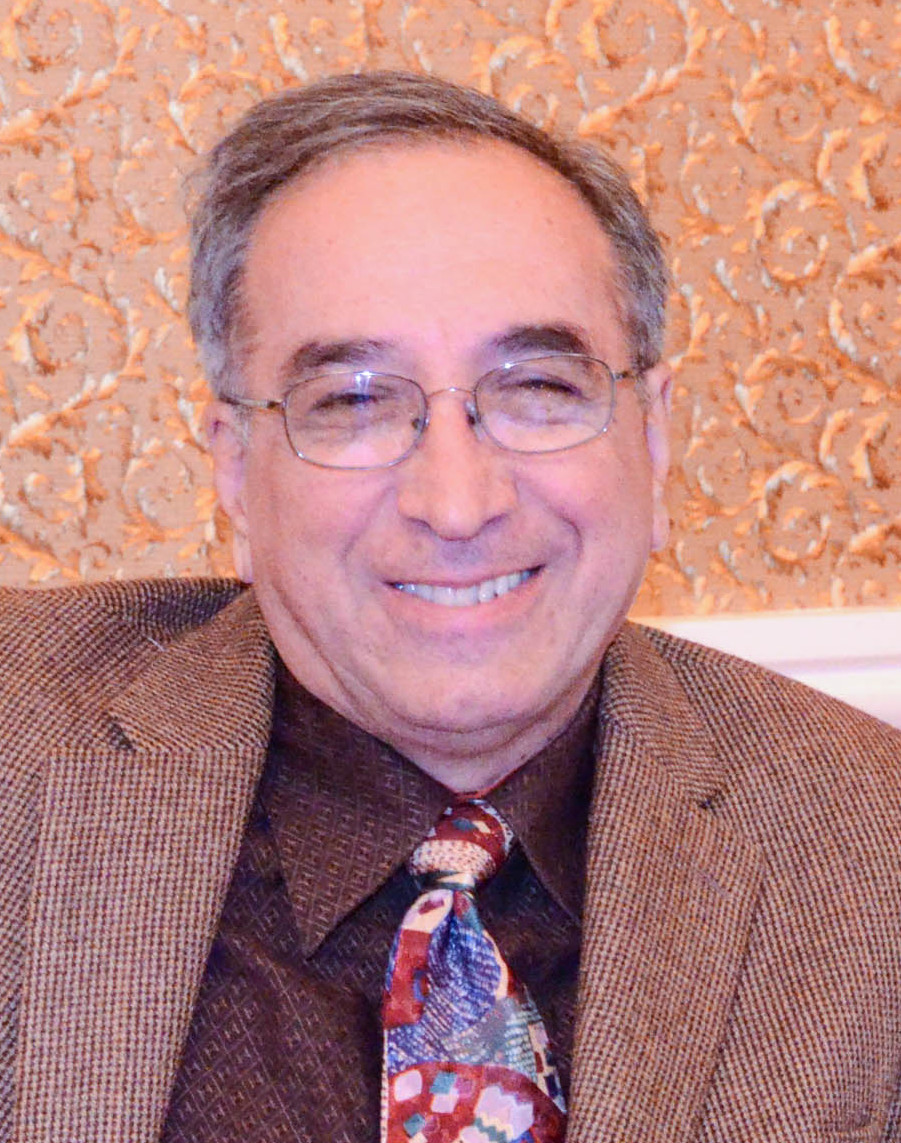
- Niknafs in 2014

President of Khazar University
- Incumbent
- Assumed office 2015

Personal details
- Education: Pahlavi University; Youngstown State University; University of Akron

Hassan Niknafs is an Iranian Azerbaijani mechanical engineer and academic administrator. He became president of Khazar University in 2015. Niknafs was dean of the school of engineering and applied sciences at Khazar University from 2013 to 2015.

== Education ==
Niknafs completed a BSc in chemical engineering at Pahlavi University in 1976. He earned a MSc in mechanical engineering at the Youngstown State University in 1979. Niknafs completed a Ph.D. in mechanical engineering at the University of Akron in 1994.

== Career ==
From 1979 to 1985, he was a project engineer for National Iranian Oil Company. In 1986–1988, he worked as a teaching assistant at Mechanical Engineering Department at the University of Akron. Then in 1988 he became a research and development engineer for Saint-Gobain NorPro Corporation, previously known as the Norton Chemical Process Products Corporation in Stow, OH. From 2001 to 2012, he taught applied math courses at the University of Akron. Then he became dean of the School of Engineering and Applied Sciences at Khazar University. In 2015, he was appointed president of Khazar University.

== Personal life ==
Niknafs' native language is Persian and his mother tongue is Azerbaijani. He is fluent in English.
