= Çöl Beşdəli =

- Municipality
- Location within Azerbaijan
- Coordinates: 39°52′53″N 48°47′17″E
- Country: Azerbaijan
- Rayon: Sabirabad

Population
  - Total: 1,296
- Time zone: UTC+4 (AZT)
  - Summer (DST): UTC+5 (AZT)

Çöl Beşdəli (also, Chël’beshdali, Chol’-Beshtali, and Chol’beshtaly) is a village and municipality in the Sabirabad Rayon of Azerbaijan. It has a population of 1,296.

== Notable natives ==
- Yavar Jamalov — Minister of Defense Industry of Azerbaijan (since 2006).
