= Vugar Mustafayev (minister) =

- Vüqar Mustafayev

Minister of Defense Industry
- Incumbent
- Assumed office November 18, 2023
- President: Ilham Aliyev
- Prime Minister: Ali Asadov
- Preceded by: Madat Guliyev

Personal details
- Born: 1986 (age 39–40) Baku, Azerbaijan Azerbaijan SSR, Soviet Union (now Azerbaijan)
- Citizenship: Azerbaijan
- Children: 2

Vugar Mustafayev (Azerbaijani: Vüqar Valeh oğlu Mustafayev; born 1986) is the minister of the Ministry of Defense Industry of Azerbaijan.

== Early life and education ==
Vugar Mustafayev was born in 1986 in Baku. In 2004, he entered the Engineering Economy and Management – Management specialty of the Academy of Public Administration under the President of the Republic of Azerbaijan for a bachelor's degree, and graduated with honors in 2008. From 2010 to 2013, he studied at the "Business Management (MBA)" master's program of Khazar University, majoring in finance and credit.

In addition to being a member of the Institute of Internal Auditors, an international association, since 2016, he has obtained the "Certified Internal Auditor (CIA)" – International Internal Auditor qualification, and since 2020 he has the international "IBM Data Science Specialization" – Data Science qualification.

He was in military service in the military unit No. N of the Internal Troops of the Ministry of Internal Affairs of Azerbaijan.

He is married and has two children.

== Career ==
In 2006–2008, during his undergraduate studies, he worked as a Training Coordinator and Finance and accounting specialist in various companies. In 2009–2012, he worked as a senior specialist in the company "Ernst & Young CIS B.V." operating in Azerbaijan. In 2012–2014, he worked as the Director of the Internal Audit Department at Azerfon LLC. Since 2014, he has worked in various management positions in PASHA Holding LLC and its related companies.

By the Decree of the President of the Republic of Azerbaijan dated March 15, 2023, he was appointed to the position of Deputy Minister of Defense Industry of the Republic of Azerbaijan.

By the Decree of the President of the Republic of Azerbaijan dated November 18, 2023, he was appointed as the Minister of Defense Industry of the Republic of Azerbaijan.
