= Soltan Mammadov =

Azerbaijani politician (born 1974)

Soltan Məmmədov Member of the National Assembly of Azerbaijan

Member of the Azerbaijan Parliament for Khazar raion
- Incumbent
- Assumed office 10 March 2020
- Preceded by: new constituency

Personal details
- Born: 1 April 1974 (age 52) Baku, Azerbaijan SSR, Soviet Union
- Party: Non-partisan
- Education: Azerbaijan State Oil and Industry University; Khazar University
- Committees: Labor and Social Policy Committee; Committee on Healthcare

Soltan Teymur oglu Mammadov (Azerbaijani: Soltan Teymur oğlu Məmmədov; born 1 April 1974) is an Azerbaijani politician who is a Member of the National Assembly of Azerbaijan (VI convocation).

== Life ==
Soltan Mammadov was born on April 1, 1974, in Baku. Graduated from the Faculty of Automation of Production Processes of the Azerbaijan State Oil and Industry University and the Faculty of Public Health Management of the Khazar University, he has a Ph.D. at technical sciences. He was awarded the “Taraggi” medal.

== Political activity ==
He is non-partisan. He is a member of the Labor and Social Policy Committee and the Committee on Healthcare of the Milli Mejlis. Head of the working group for the Azerbaijani-French inter-parliamentary relations, member of the working groups for the inter-parliamentary relation of Azerbaijan with the Federal Republic of Germany, United Arab Emirates, Bosnia and Herzegovina, Czech Republic, China, Georgia, Switzerland, Italy, Colombia and Japan. He is a substitute member of the Azerbaijani delegation to the Euronest Parliamentary Assembly.
