= Zayya =

Christian saint

Saint Zayya
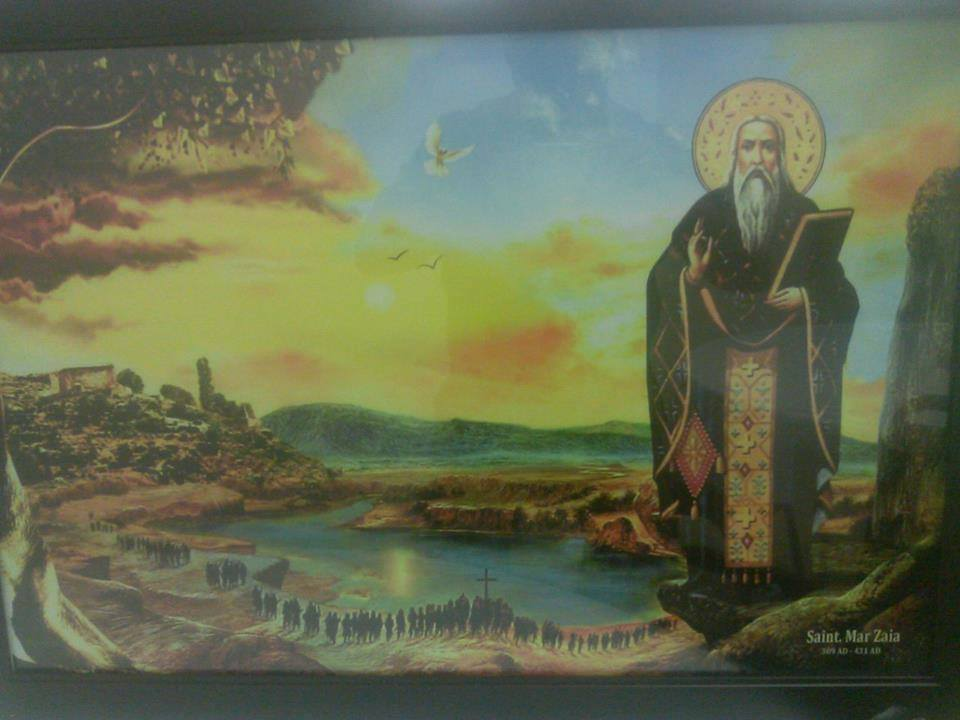
- Saint Zay'ā the Blessed

Blessed and Handsome
- Born: Thursday of Christ’s Ascension, 26 May (Old Style) 309 AD; Roman Palestine
- Died: Wednesday, 7 January (Old Style) 431 AD; Mātā d-‘Umrā d-Mār Zay'ā, Jilu (present-day Çevrecik, Hakkâri province, Turkey)
- Venerated in: Assyrian Church of the East; Ancient Church of the East; Chaldean Catholic Church; Chaldean Syrian Church; Syro-Malabar Catholic Church; Eastern Orthodox Church
- Major shrine: Sts. Zay'ā and Tāwor Cathedral, Mātā d-‘Umrā d-Mār Zay'ā, Jilu
- Feast: September 13
- Patronage: Jilu, travellers; protects against hail, famine, plague, anger, illness, disease and the Angel of Death.

Saint Zayya (Syriac: ܡܪܝ ܙܝܥܐ) was a travelling mystic, holy man and healer who made his way from Palestine to the mountains of northern Mesopotamia and spreading Christianity with his disciple St. Tawor. The Church of the East honours both Zayya and St. Tawor for their missionary efforts in northern Iraq and the region of Upper Dasen (modern Hakkâri province, Turkey) during the late 4th and early 5th centuries. He is also the patron saint of travellers and the Jilu district, where he is buried, and is invoked for protection from hail, famine, plague, anger, illness, disease and the Angel of Death. Zayya is often depicted in miniatures from manuscripts of the Book of Protection as an equestrian saint, spear in hand, and attacking the Angel of Death.

He is a Saint in the Assyrian Church of the East and all the apostolic churches.

== Veneration ==
According to the calendar of the Church of the East, the birth of St. Zay'ā is celebrated on May 26, and a three-day rogation (fast) precedes the commemoration of his death on the first Wednesday of January.

Traditionally, the Assyrians of Jilu celebrate the Feast (Syriac: Shahrā) of St. Zay'ā on September 13 every year on the Feast of the Cross. The reason given for this is that the Saint's other festivals fell on dates when the weather was too cold for pilgrims to be able to travel to the main shrine for the celebration. Often, the Jilu District was snowed in for six months of the year. Holding the Saint's Feast day on September 13, when the weather was more agreeable, not only meant that they could take advantage of the brighter light of moon at night, it also meant that those Jīlū men who planned on travelling before the first snows could pray for a safe and successful journey and make their vows to the Saint before departing.

Other feasts to the Saint are also celebrated by the Assyrians of Arbūsh (Tell-'Arbush) and Halmon (Tell-Jum'ah) in the Khabur district of Syria, as well as by Assyrians from the Amadiya district of Iraq, and some Assyrians from the Urmia region of Iran.

A prayer commonly attributed to St. Zay'ā is:

O almighty Lord God, examiner of the heart and kidneys, before you my God I worship, and from you I ask for mercy upon this land (Jīlū) and its inhabitants, and also upon every man that recounts or every one that writes and hangs upon himself your holy name, almighty Lord God, and my own name, your servant Zay'ā, and pleads and kneels before almighty Lord God; cause to pass from them, and may there not be in their houses, neither hail nor famine, neither plague nor anger, not the Angel of Destruction, and neither illness nor disease. Amen.

This prayer appears in a shorter form in the Saint's Vita, and also in different versions of the Book of Protection, from which amulets and talismans were copied.

== Shrines ==
Turkey

- Sts. Zay'ā and Tāwor Cathedral (Abandoned - Assyrian Church of the East), Mātā d-‘Umrā d-Mār Zay'ā, Jilu (present-day Çevrecik, Hakkari province, Turkey)

Iraq

- St. Zay'ā Cathedral (Assyrian Church of the East), Mechanics’ Quarter, Dora, Baghdad
- St. Zay'ā Church (Assyrian Church of the East), Sardarāwā, Sarsing District, Duhok Governorate
- St. Zay'ā Cave-Shrine, Duhoké, Sarsing District, Duhok Governorate
- St. Zay'ā Church (now a Mosque), 'Aqdish (Kādish), Amadiya District, Duhok Governorate
- St. Zay'ā Cathedral (Ruined - Assyrian Church of the East), Karrādat Maryam, Baghdad
- St. Zay'ā Church (Ruined - Assyrian Church of the East), Kamp al-Sikak (“Jilu Camp”), Baghdad
- St. Zay'ā Church (Ruined – Assyrian Church of the East), Khirsheniyah, Simel District, Duhok Governorate
- St. Zay'ā Church (Ruined - Chaldean Catholic Church), M‘althāyé (Malta Nasara), Duhok District, Duhok Governorate

Iran

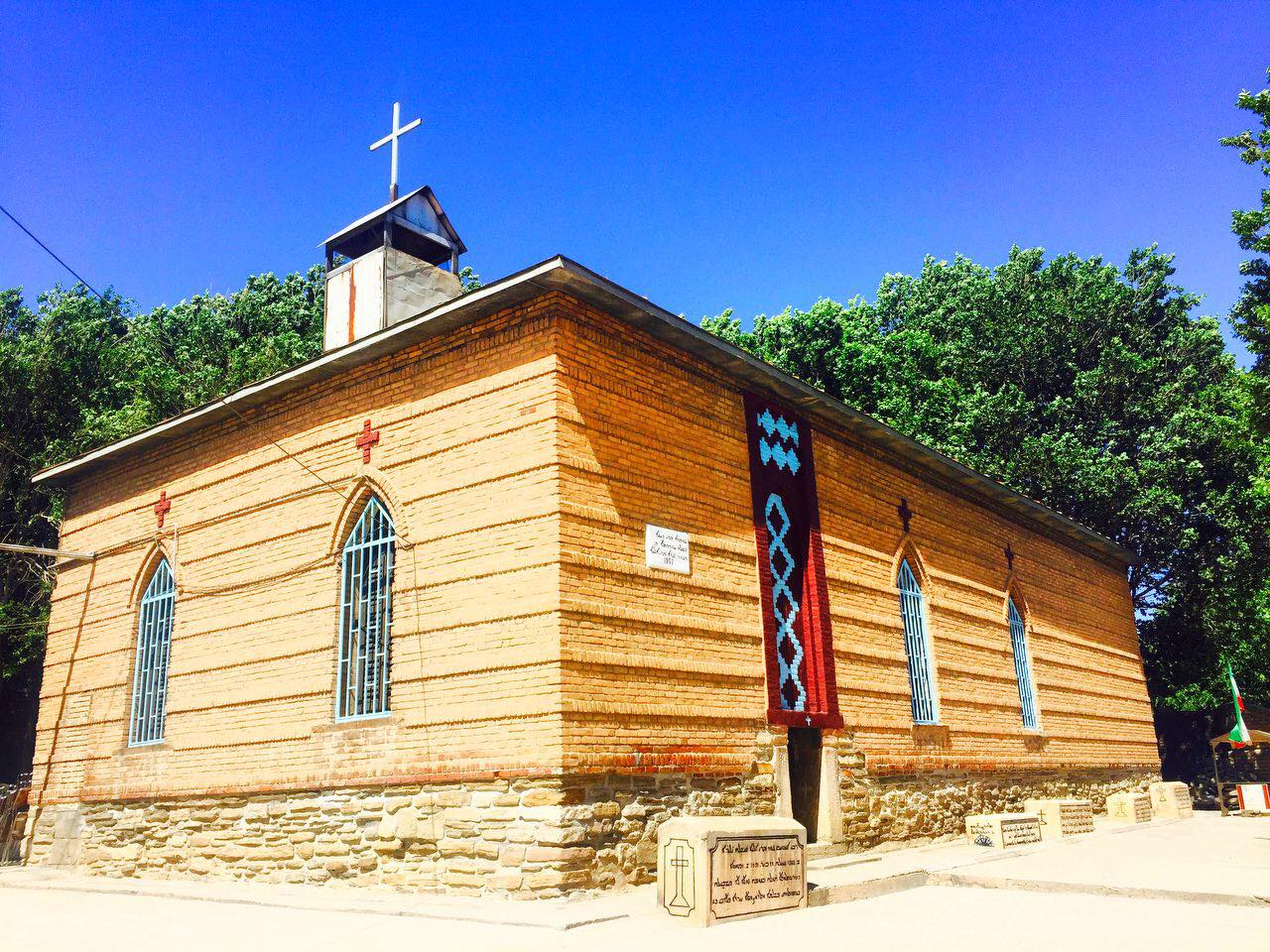
Assyrian church of Mar Zayya in Gug Tappeh, Iran.

- St. Zay'ā Cathedral (Assyrian Church of the East), Geogtāpā, Urmia County, West Azerbaijan Province
- St. Zay'ā Church (Assyrian Church of the East), Hassar d-Spurghān, Urmia County, West Azerbaijan Province
- St. Zay'ā Church (Chaldean Catholic Church), Khosrāwā, Salmas County, West Azerbaijan Province

Syria

- St. Zay'ā Church (New – Assyrian Church of the East), Tell-Gorān, Al-Hasakah Governorate
- St. Zay'ā Church (Old – Assyrian Church of the East), Tell-Gorān, Al-Hasakah Governorate
- St. Zay'ā Church (Chaldean Catholic Church), Tell-Sāameh, Al-Hasakah Governorate

Lebanon

- St. Zay'ā Church (Assyrian Church of the East), Ksārā, Zahlé District, Beqaa Governorate

Australia

- St. Zaia Cathedral (Ancient Church of the East) West Hoxton, NSW

U.S.A.

- St. Zaia Cathedral (Assyrian Church of the East), Modesto, CA

Canada

- St. Zaia Church (Assyrian Church of the East), London, ON

India

- St. Ziah Church (Assyrian Church of the East - Chaldean Syrian Church), Palakkad (Palghat), Thrissur District, Kerala

== See also ==
- Jilu
- Saints days
- Syriac Christianity
- Church of the East
- Assyrian Church of the East
- Ancient Church of the East
- Chaldean Catholic Church
