= Yavar Jamalov =

Azerbaijani politician

- Yavər Camalov
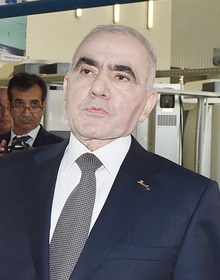
- Jamalov in 2017

Minister of Defense Industry of Azerbaijan
- In office March 2006 – 23 June 2018
- President: Ilham Aliyev
- Preceded by: office established

Personal details
- Born: 17 October 1949 Çöl Beşdəli, Sabirabad District, Azerbaijan SSR, Soviet Union
- Died: 23 June 2018 (aged 68) Baku, Azerbaijan

Yavar Jamalov Talyb oglu (Azerbaijani: Yavər Camalov Talıb oğlu; 17 October 1949 – 23 June 2018) was an Azerbaijani politician who served as the first Minister of Defense Industry of Azerbaijan.

== Early life ==
Jamalov was born on 17 October 1949 in Çöl Beşdəli village of Sabirabad Rayon, Azerbaijan. In 2003–2006, he worked as the Director of Azneft production company. In 1967–1972, he studied at the Azerbaijan Oil and Chemistry Institute.

== Political career ==
In March 2006, he was appointed the Minister of Defense Industry by President Ilham Aliyev. The ministry was established on 16 December 2005 on the basis of the State Special Machinery Manufacturing and Conservation Committee. Since taking the office, Jamalov has significantly improved Azerbaijan's military potential increasing domestic production of arms and weaponry and cooperating with more than 60 firms in 20 countries. Azerbaijan takes part in Special Operations Forces Exhibition every two years marketing Azerbaijan-made production.

== Awards ==
On 16 October 2009 Jamalov was awarded with Shohrat Order by President Aliyev for his service in economic development of the country.

== See also ==
- Azerbaijani Armed Forces
