= Khazar University =

University in Baku, Azerbaijan

- Xəzər Universitəsi
- Motto: “Always leading the way”
- Type: Private
- Chairman: Professor Hamlet Isakhanli
- Rector: Dr. Irada Khalilova (appointed 2019)
- Academic staff: 250
- Students: 2500
- Location: Baku, Azerbaijan
- Language: English
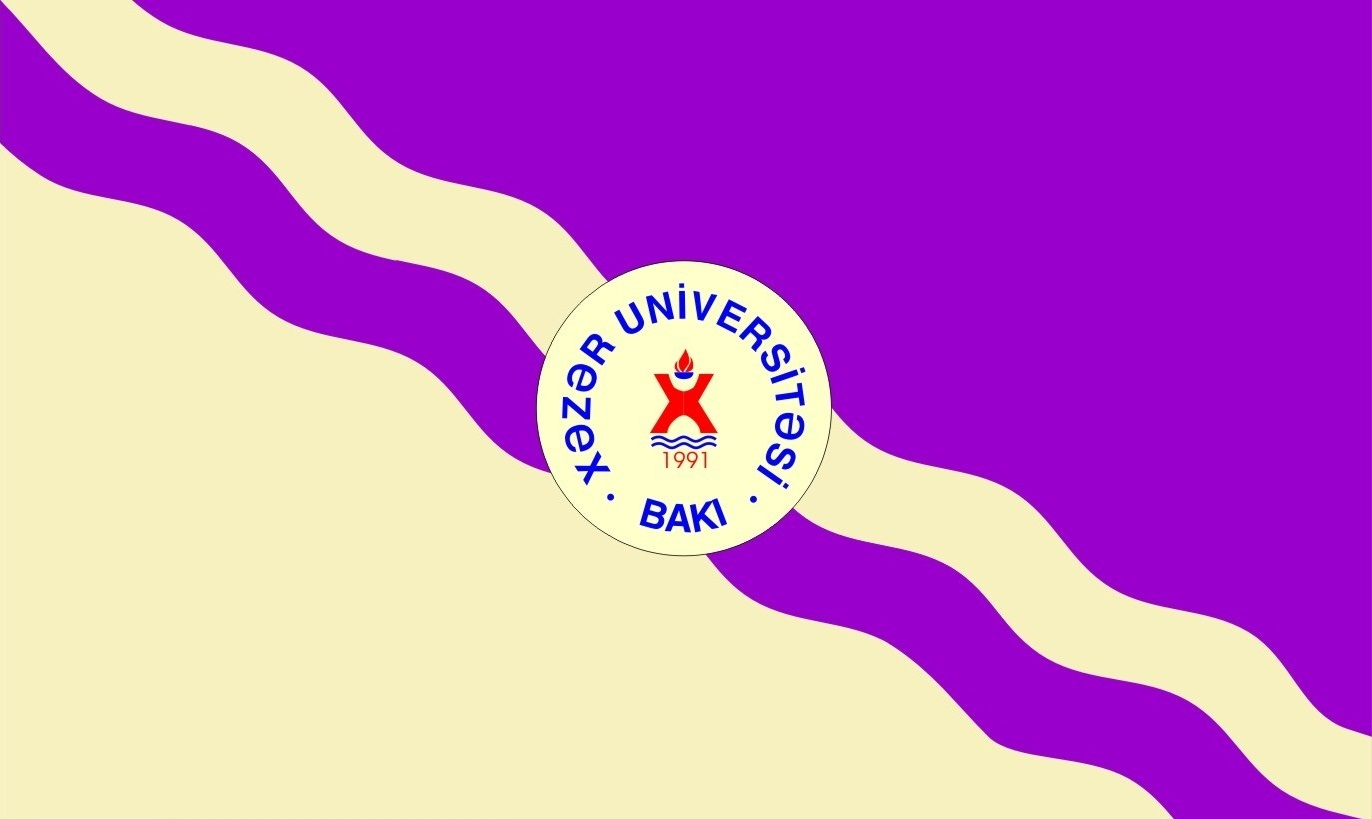

University rankings

Global – Overall
- QS World: 951-1000 (2026)

Regional – Overall
- QS Emerging Europe and Central Asia: 211-220 (2022)

Khazar University (Azerbaijani: Xəzər Universiteti, which directly translates as Caspian University) is a private university located in Baku, Azerbaijan.

== Campuses ==
Khazar University owns four campuses in the city of Baku and two campuses in regions of Azerbaijan.

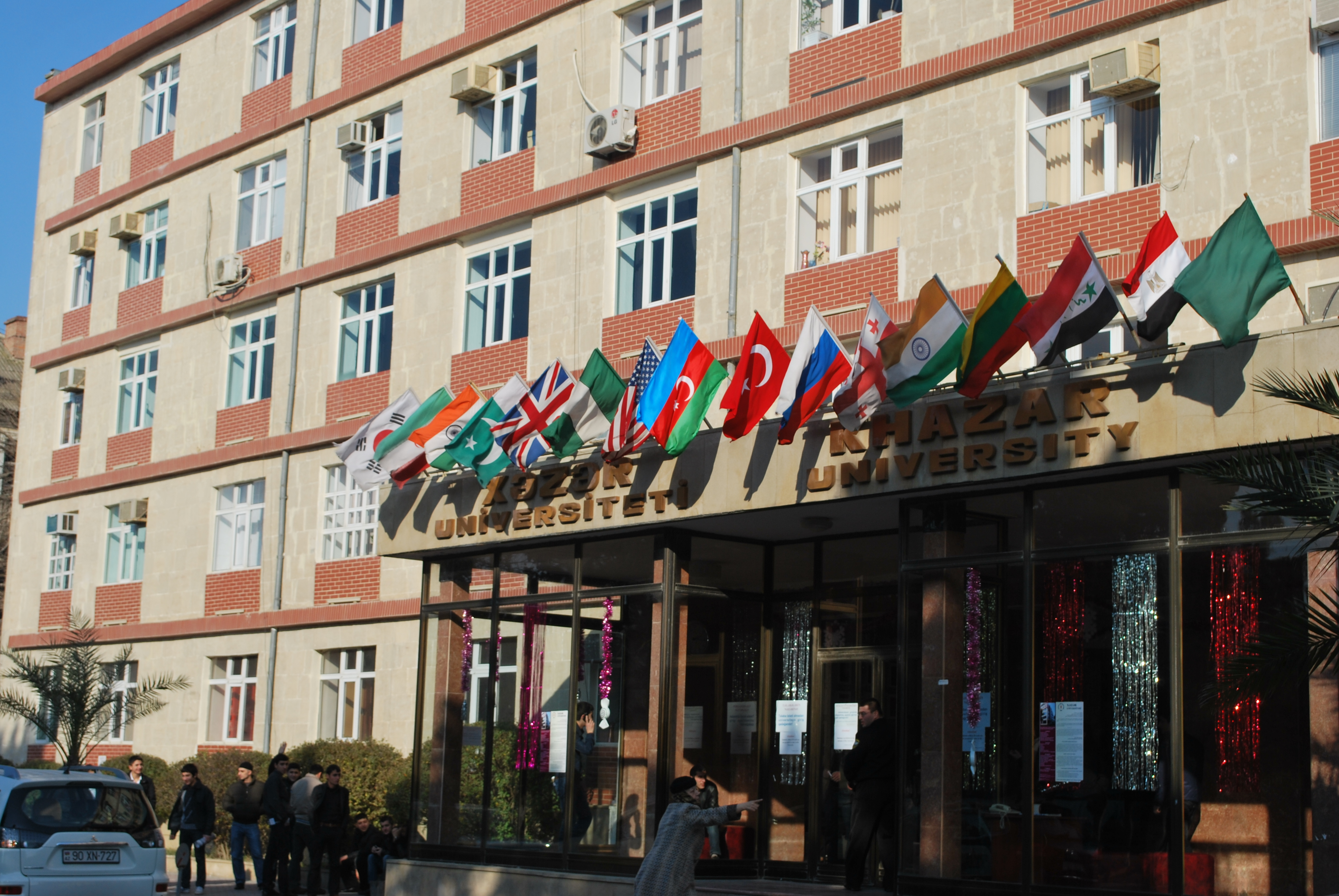
Neftchilar Campus

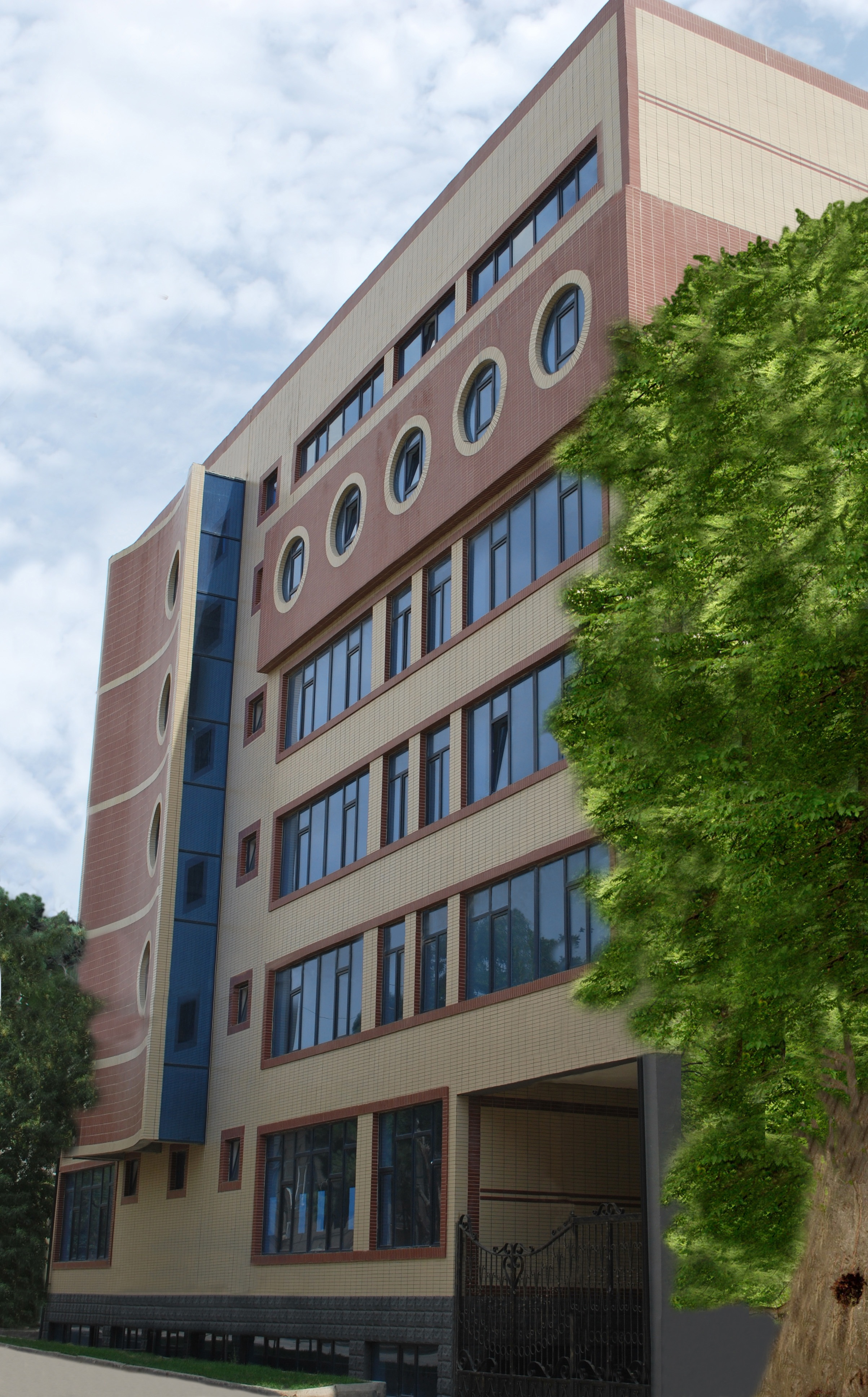
Neftchilar Campus

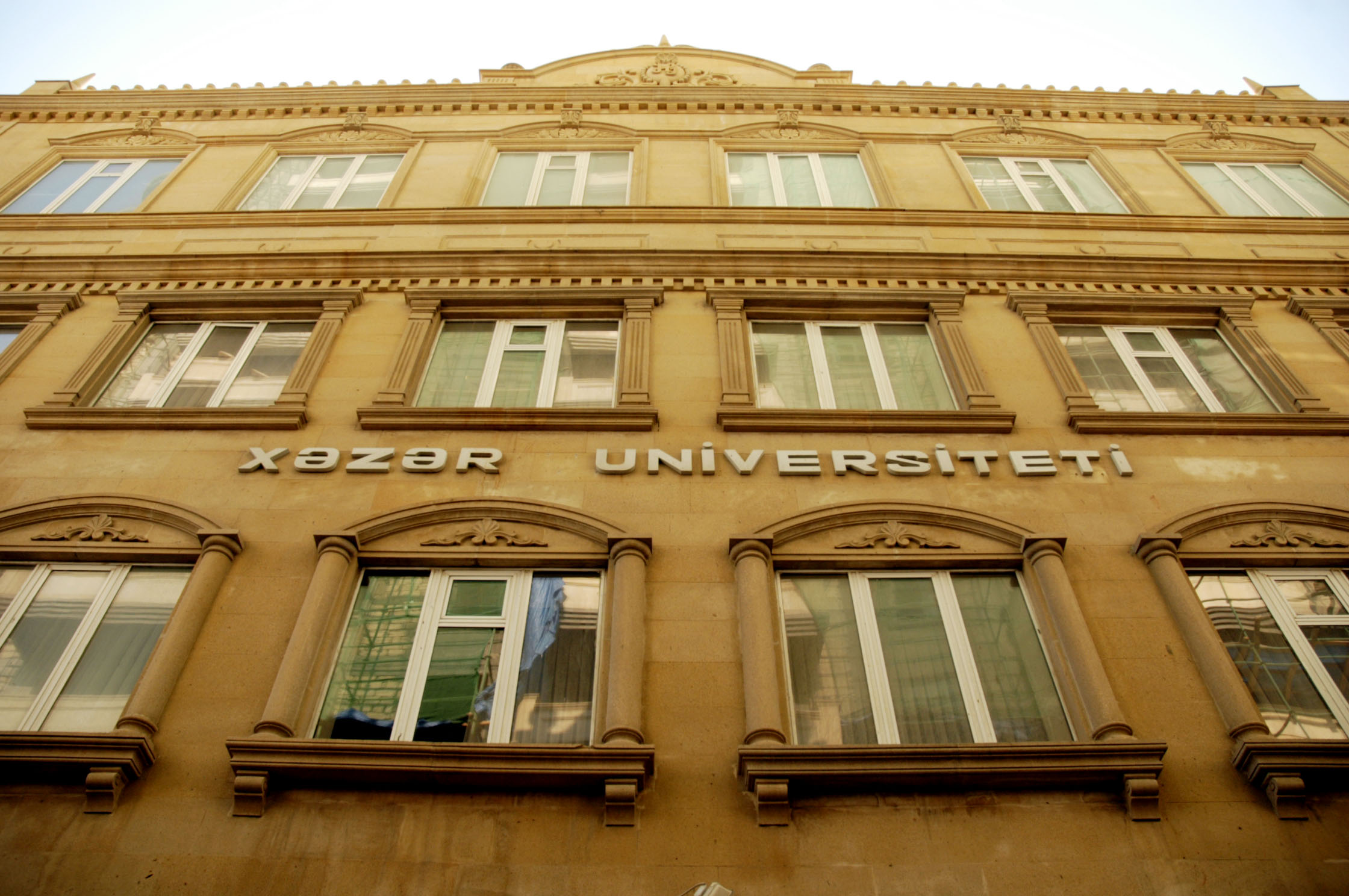
Downtown Campus
- Neftchilar Campus
- Downtown Campus
- Baku Dunya School Campus – Education complex for “Dunya” School, also Khazar University School of Education's Internship Center, Sports Center, Dormitory and Technopark
- Sumgayit Dunya School Campus
- Ganja Dunya School Campus
- Buzovna Conference and Leisure Center

== Background information ==
Khazar University was founded in March 1991 by Hamlet Isakhanli. The university became one of the first private universities in Eastern Europe, the Caucasus and Central Asia and the first in Azerbaijan to introduce Western-style, research-oriented higher education. Isakhanli formed Khazar in the interest of reforming the previous system of higher education under Soviet rule.

== Academic information ==
In Azerbaijan, Khazar University is providing Western-style education on all levels: undergraduate, graduate, and doctoral. Khazar University participates in foreign student exchange programs. It also runs a lab.

	There are five schools (colleges) operating within Khazar University:
1	School of Science and Engineering
2	School of Economics and Management
3	School of Humanities, Education and Social Sciences
4	Graduate School of Science, Art and Technology
5	Graduate School of Economics and Business

== Departments ==
=== History and Archaeology ===
The Department of History and Archaeology was established in June 1993 and was formerly known as the Department of History. It falls within the School of Humanities, Education and Social Sciences.

=== Political Sciences and Philosophy ===
==== Institute of Politics ====
The institute was formerly known as the Center for International and Strategic Studies.

Tofik Abaskuliyev at work at Khazar University

== Dictionary and Encyclopedia Center ==
The Khazar University Dictionary and Encyclopedia Center, located on the campus of Khazar University in Baku, Azerbaijan, it has been in operation since April 1996. The center is directed by Professor Tofik Abaskuliyev. The center's main functions are to perform linguistic and lexicological research and to prepare, evaluate and publish bilingual, multilingual and encyclopedic dictionaries.

== Notable alumni ==
- Vugar Mustafayev (minister), the minister of the Ministry of Defence Industry of Azerbaijan
- Soltan Mammadov, an Azerbaijani politician, member of the National Assembly of Azerbaijan
- Ceyhun Məmmədov (deputat), an Azerbaijani public and political figure, a deputy The Milli Majlis of the Republic of Azerbaijan
- Adnan Hajizadeh, blogger and youth activist
- Nargiz Birk-Petersen, television commentator
- Nigar Jamal, winner of Eurovision 2011

== Affiliations ==
The university is a member of the Caucasus University Association.
