= Ministry of Defence Industry of Azerbaijan =

Government ministry of Azerbaijan

Ministry of Defence of Azerbaijan
- Azərbaycan Respublikasının Müdafiə Sənayesi Nazirliyi
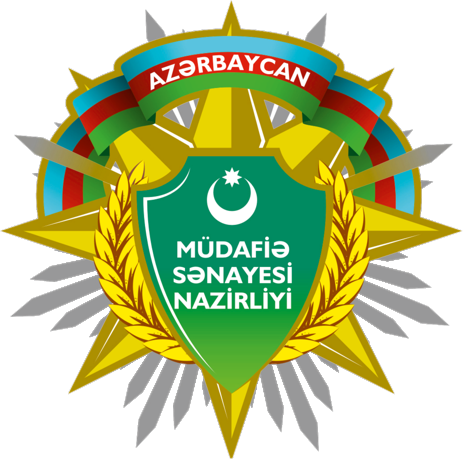

Agency overview
- Formed: December 16, 2005; 20 years ago
- Jurisdiction: Government of Azerbaijan
- Headquarters: 40, Metbuat Ave. Baku, AZ 1141, Azerbaijan Republic
- Minister responsible: Vugar Mustafayev
- Website: www.mdi.gov.az

The Ministry of Defence Industry of Azerbaijan (Azerbaijani: Azərbaycan Respublikasının Müdafiə Sənayesi Nazirliyi) is a governmental agency within the Cabinet of Azerbaijan in charge of design, manufacturing, regulation and maintenance of products in the fields of defense, radio electronics, instrument engineering.

The Ministry was established on December 16, 2005, by presidential decree. The new Ministry, incorporated the State Departments for Military Industry and the Armaments and the Military Science Center, both of which were formerly separate agencies within the Military of Azerbaijan. Yavar Jamalov was the first head of this ministry between March 2006 – 23 June 2018. Lieutenant general Madat Guliyev was appointed as the Minister of Defence Industry by decree of the Azerbaijani President dated 20 June 2019.

== Background ==
Azerbaijan has a desire to become a major arms exporter to the South Caucasus, Central Asia and Middle East. It was announced in January 2008 that the defence industry of Azerbaijan would begin to manufacture armoured personnel carriers and infantry fighting vehicles, as well as small calibre artillery guns. Whether this has actually taken place is unclear. The new ministry is cooperating with the defence sectors of Ukraine, Belarus and Pakistan. In 2008 several more military factories were created in Azerbaijan.

According to Sumarinly, the MDI has been in talks with various Israeli defense firms and two Turkish companies about the production of an armored vehicle based on the Russian T-55 tank’s chassis. MDI will also provide 30 South-African-designed Matador and Marauder armored vehicles to the army.

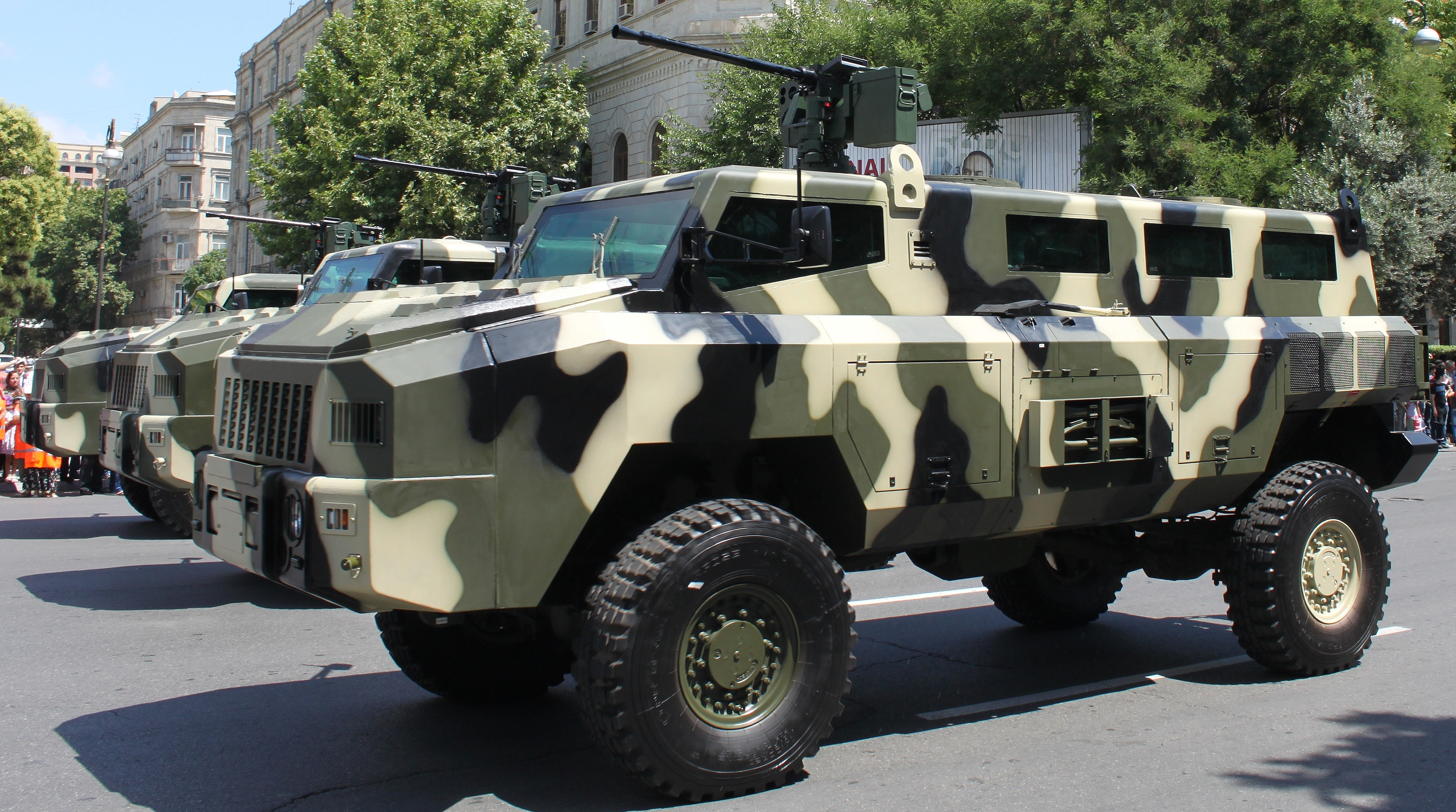

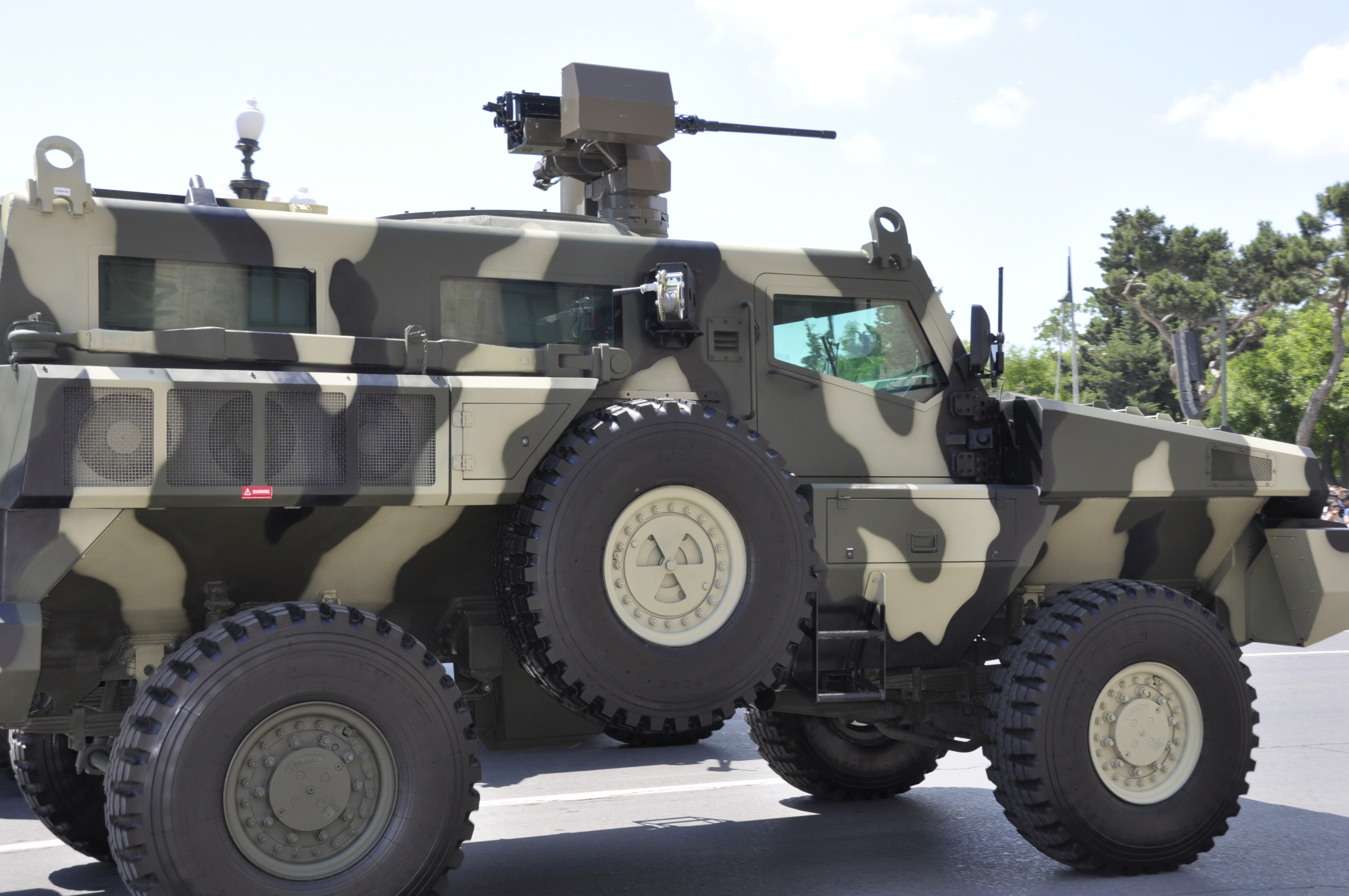
Matador and Marauder mine-protected vehicles at the military parade in Baku

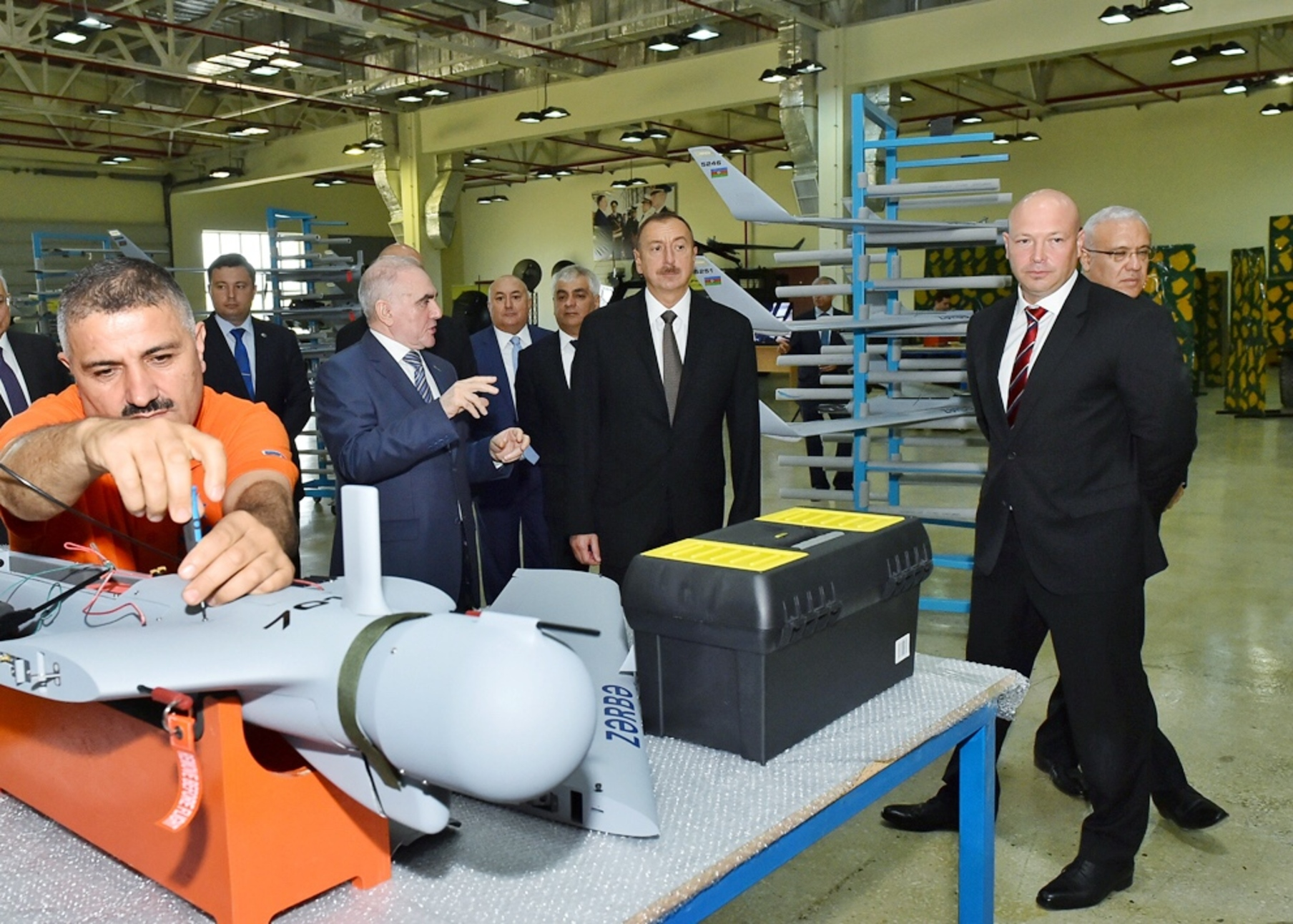
AZAD Systems Co production branch of the Defense Industry Ministry presents Zarba UAVs

In March 2011, the MDI presented its prototype of an Austrian-designed four-seater known as the Diamond DA-42 military passenger plane. The plane is assembled by AZAD Systems, an Azerbaijani state-owned firm.

Overall, Azerbaijani military production more than doubled between 2009 and 2010, and the product line expanded by 17 percent, according to MDI.

== Enterprises ==
Enterprises of the Ministry include:

- RPE Iglim, "Avia-Agregat" plant, RPE "Sanayejihaz" ("Prompribor"), RPE "Dalga” and "Alov"plant are the biggest suppliers for aviation and shipbuilding industries.
- Radiogurashdirma ("Radio engineering"), "Azon", "Peyk" and "Computer" plants are manufacturing products for communication means and radio-electronic industry.
- RPE Neftgazavtomat, "Telemekhanika" and Baku "Jihazgayirma" (Instrument Engineering) plants are involved in manufacture of devices and automation systems for monitoring technological processes in oil/gas production, refinery and chemical industries.
- RPE Automatic Lines is manufacturing non-standard equipment and products for application in electrotechnical &machine engineering industries.
- Avia-Agregat manufactures multi-purpose aviation equipment, various airdrome conditioners, universal container of board conductor, air-to-air radiators, fuel-oil, air-to-air heat exchangers, ventilators.
- AZAD Systems Co presented Zarba UAVs in 2016.

== Cooperation ==
The Ministry's enterprises cooperate with partners in many foreign countries in the following areas:

- Aviation
- Oil industry
- Instrument Engineering
- Navigation

Recently, the Turkish firms of ASELSAN and MKEK has signed a deal with Azerbaijan. ASELSAN has been awarded to co-produce monocular night vision sights and thermal scopes (sniper rifles etc.) with Azerbaijan.

Makina Kimya Endüstrisi Kurumu (MKE) has been awarded a contract worth $1.150.000 to produce weapons, ammunition, chemicals and other materials. Besides the contract, MKEK will also take part in the assistance of modernization of the Azeri defense industries.

Azerbaijani-made prototypes of Orbiter 2M Unmanned aerial vehicle are expected to undergo testing for up to two years. Full-scale production won't begin before 2013, under the existing timetable. Production of drones has started at Azad Systems, a joint venture between Azerbaijan's Defence Industry Ministry and Israeli manufacturer Aeronautics.

=== Research Production Enterprise Iglim ===
- Multi-purpose Airfield Conditioners: АК-04-9А; АК-1,6-9А
- Attendant's Container KBU 8-10
- Air-to-Air Radiators: VVR 01.7604.5100.00;
- VVR 5.12.7604.0020.00; VVR 2.11.7604.0400.00;
- Fuel-Oil Radiators: 5451Т; 5580Т; 5783 Т-1
- Fuel-Oil Heat Exchangers: 6212 Т; 6212Т-01; 6107 Т
- Air-to-Air Heat Exchanger 6246 Т
- Supercharger 5620
- Dehydrator 2394T
- Fans: 5617 Т; 4523
- Air Drier 6011
- Moisture separators: 2227; 6368; 5676А; 2788; 6377; 6917; 6678

On September 27, 2016, the 2nd Azerbaijan International Defence Exhibition “ADEX-2016” was held at Baku Expo Centre. The “Memorandum of Understanding” was signed between the Minister of Defence Industry Yavar Jamalov and the Minister of Defence Zakir Hasanov during the event. According to the agreement between the parties, the Armed Forces will be supplied with new unmanned aerial vehicles, which were produced at the Ministry's enterprises. The aerial vehicle included reconnaissance and observation drones and a new model of “Zarba".

The ministry of Defence Industry also cooperates with the following countries in the field of production and modernization of military equipment.

- Israel: modernization and production of military equipment
- Jordan: Cooperation
- Pakistan: the production of aerial bombs and artillery shells of various calibres
- Russia: the production of automatic machines.
- Turkey: production and modernization of military equipment, cooperation with defence industry enterprises - Aselsan, FNSS, Selex, MKEK and Roketsan
- Ukraine: modernization of military equipment
- South Africa: modernization and production of military equipment.
- Germany: cooperation with the defence concern Rheinmetall (Protocol of Intent)

== Air Force ==
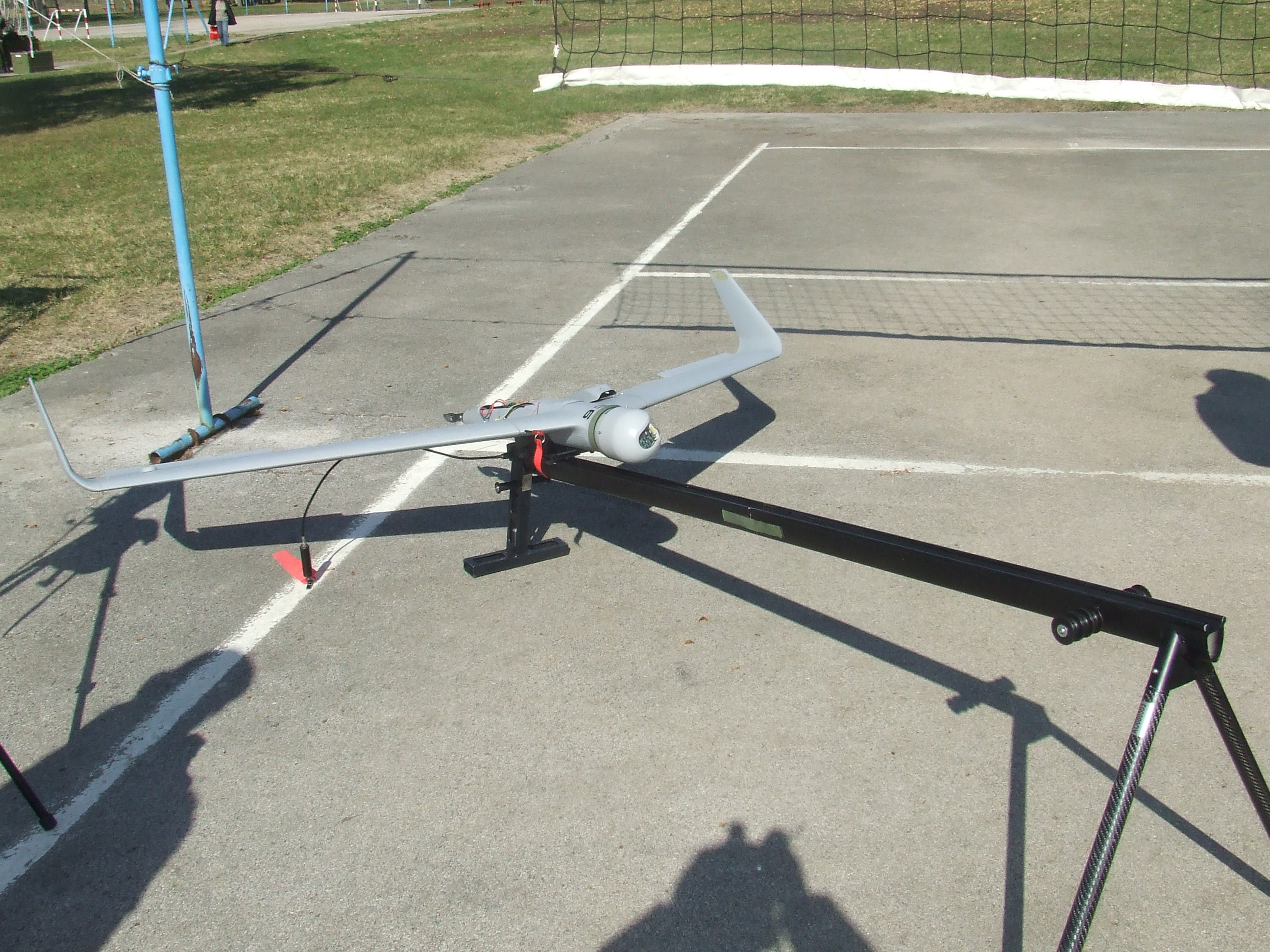
Orbiter-2M

The country also manufactures Israeli-designed spy planes. Among the licensed pilotless spy plane is the Orbiter-2M and the Aerostar. Both are manufactured at the government-owned Azad Systems Company plant near Baku. The head of the Defense Industry, Yaver Jamalov, said that by the end of 2011 a total of 60 UAVs would be produced.

== Navy ==
In May 2011, President of the State Oil Company of Azerbaijan Republic Rovnag Abdullayev stated that Azerbaijan will start the production of national warships after 2013.

== Current production ==
In 2008, Azerbaijan revealed the Istiglal IST-14.5. An anti-material rifle, which can be taken down into 2 separate components for easy transportation. The rifle is said to be operable in adverse weather such as rain and dirt, with temperature ranges from 50 to -50 degrees Celsius. The rifle is operated in several countries. In 2011, Azerbaijan began producing AK-74M assault rifles under a license from the Russian armaments manufacturer Izhmash. The assault rifles are being produced for the Azerbaijani Armed Forces under the name Khazri. In addition to production of Istiglal IST-14.5 and AK-74M, Azerbaijan has also been producing the following weapon systems:

- IST – 12.7 mm calibre sniper rifle
- UP-7.62 general-purpose machine gun.
- Inam, Zafar, and Zafar-K pistols (jointly with the Turkish TİSAŞ company)
- Qaya-1 and Qaya-2 RPG-7V2 hand-held anti-tank grenade launchers
- 60 mm mortar
- 82 mm mortar
- 107 mm reactive volley-fire system (gate mechanism and missiles)
- Matador and Marauder mine-protected armoured vehicles (jointly with the Paramount Group of South Africa)
- iLDIRIM mine-resistant ambush protected vehicle
- Small fire arms, munitions for artillery-type weaponry, mines, Qigilcim mine and bomb clearance system, helmets, ballistic protection, optical devices, collimator, thermal sighting system, multi-spectral covers, dosimeters for submariners and more.

== Potential future projects ==
Murad Bayar, the undersecretary for Turkish Defense Industries, said that Turkey aimed to manufacture new tanks for the Turkish Armed Forces. "Some of these tanks could be manufactured in Azerbaijan, and some can be produced in Turkey, joint production with Azerbaijan in line with this country`s needs in the future." Bayar told.

Azerbaijani-made prototypes of Orbiter 2M Unmanned aerial vehicle are expected to undergo testing for up to two years. Full-scale production won't begin before 2013, under the existing timetable. Production of drones has started at Azad Systems, a joint venture between Azerbaijan's Defence Industry Ministry and Israeli manufacturer Aeronautics.

According to the Azerbaijani APA agency in November 2010, "Azerbaijan is in the negotiations with some other countries on helicopter production." - said by the Minister of Defence Industry of Azerbaijan, Yavar Jamalov. He also mentioned that recently the Ukrainian Premier Minister offered Azerbaijan joint production of 100 helicopters and it is possible. According to him, the Ministry of Defence Industry of Azerbaijan is in the negotiations with some other countries as well as Ukraine.

== Modernization ==
In 2011, the reconstructed instrument-making plant of the Jihaz Production Association of the Ministry of Defence Industry was opened in Baku.

In 2011, production of unmanned aerial vehicles (UAVs) of the Aerostar and Orbiter-2M brands was continued.

In 2016, the industry started its own production of short-range missiles. Approximately 125 types of products are being developed, and projects for creating air-to-ground, air-to-air, and ground-to-ground missiles are being implemented.

On February 14, 2017, there was a demonstration of the national armoured vehicle “Tufan”, which is resistant to mines. About six months was spent for the development of this armoured vehicle.

On June 23, 2017, the opening ceremony of a plant for the production of various types of MSGL grenade rounds and 40 types grenade launchers of the Sharg Production Association of the Ministry was held in Shirvan. The main goal of this plant is to organize the production of four types of grenade rounds: fragmentation, cumulative fragmentation, lighting and smoke for 40x46 mm revolving grenade launchers capable of meeting the standards of the North Atlantic Treaty Organization (NATO).

The improvement of the Gürzə armoured vehicle continues by attaching new combat modules to it.
