= List of conflicts in territory of the former Soviet Union =

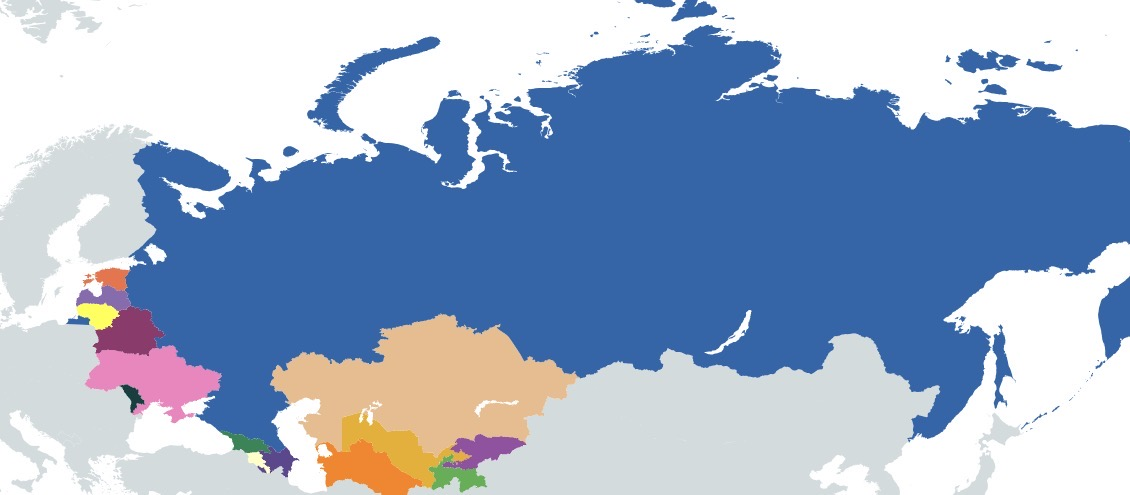
Map of the international boundaries after the dissolution of the Soviet Union in 1991

This article provides a list of conflicts that have occurred in the territory of the former Soviet Union. In 1991, the dissolution of the Soviet Union resulted in the emergence of 15 post-Soviet states: Armenia, Azerbaijan, Belarus, Estonia, Georgia, Kazakhstan, Kyrgyzstan, Latvia, Lithuania, Moldova, Russia, Tajikistan, Turkmenistan, Ukraine, and Uzbekistan.

== Background and causes ==
=== Soviet nationalities policy ===
The post-Soviet conflicts have their roots in the Soviet nationalities policy. The collapse of the Soviet Union saw the emergence of the 15 new states, although interethnic conflicts erupted in many of them shortly afterwards. The causes of these conflicts can be found in the legacy of the Soviet ethno-territorial federalism. The Soviet Union largely operated as an ethno-federation — designed to manage ethnic diversity in the centralized socialist state. Granting autonomies, legal classifications and bureaucratic segmentation institutionalized ethnic divisions. Even though the constituent units of the Soviet Union were actually deprived of meaningful sovereignty, the Soviet structures still created durable divisions along ethnic lines between groups and path dependencies which made the conflicts more likely.

The Soviet ethno-federal policies saw the creation of the union republics, the autonomous republics and autonomous oblasts. Their autonomy was only nominal, and all were subject to the strict central rule through the Communist Party. However, the arrangement still created the symbolic representation and mechanism for elite co-option, which led to the political and resource competition based on ethnic lines. The Korenizatsiia policy saw the emergence of the ethnic elites which operated through their own "ethnic machines". Even after Joseph Stalin reversed the Korenizatsiia, the structures still remained in place.

The Soviet Union conducted the process of national delimitation, which proceeded based on the political rather than ethnographic logic. In particular, the Moscow sought to prevent any group from consolidating independent power. The fragmentation brought by national delimitation created ambigious boundaries, cross-cutting identities and demographic inconsistencies. This laid foundation of the territorial disputes. The ethno-federal Soviet policies "planted the seeds of secession by creating quasi-sovereign units with symbolic and legal legitimacy, even in the absence of actual autonomy". After 1991, the autonomous structures became the rallying points for the separatist claims.

After the collapse of the Soviet Union, the post-Soviet republics inherited the Soviet ethno-federal framework, along with its unresolved contradictions. The collapse did not eliminate the system of institutionalized ethnicity, but decentralized it, leading to political actors reinterpreting the Soviet-era structures to pursue new goals. The institutions that "had once administered identity now became arenas of identity contestation". The Soviet-era autonomies served "as a ready-made institutional template for political mobilization and international appeals". The case of Nagorno-Karabakh showcased the contradictory policies of the Soviet system — a majority-Armenian region was placed within Azerbaijan, leading to both sides claiming legitimacy based on the different Soviet principles.

The Soviet ethnofederalism created territorial units which might not have been legally autonomous or administratively distinct but "were marked by the institutionalization of ethnicity and the presence of political elites capable of mobilizing that identity". However, the Soviet legacy did not produce conflict in all cases deterministically. For example, Tatarstan negotiated a treaty with Moscow to gain wide autonomy instead of pushing for independence. Thus, while the Soviet design did not make the conflict inevitable, it "structured the menu of options available to political actors". In particular, the likelihood of conflict depended on three conditions: ethnic mobilization, elite leadership, and external support. While the Soviet legacy provided preconditions for conflicts, these conditions alone were not sufficient, being dependent upon elite strategies, external actors, and state responses.

=== Russian interference ===
Since the collapse of the Soviet Union, Russia has used the post-Soviet conflicts as a tool in its hybrid warfare strategy to establish a sphere of influence over the former Soviet Union. The weak Soviet Union and then Russia first sought to prevent the Soviet republics from seceding, and then to impede their state-building when the collapse became inevitable after the August 1991 coup attempt. Russia has used the strategy to back the separatist movements in many cases to achieve its goals. Through this strategy, Russia weakened a number of post-Soviet states to the point of forcing them back into the Russian sphere of influence by joining the Commonwealth of Independent States. Russia also assumed the role of a mediator as the West in the 1990s was more concerned with the Yugoslav Wars and sought to keep Soviet nuclear arsenal under centralized Russian control. Russia is interested in perpetuating unresolved frozen conflicts to exert control over the territories involved. Possessing military and other instruments in these territories, Russia can manipulate the manifestations of the conflict to influence the situation towards the peace or war. Additionally, Russia uses the fragile security environment as its lever of influence.

=== State weakness and elite disunity ===
The weakness of newly emerged states following the collapse of the Soviet Union and elite disunity have been cited as other causes of conflict. The places that managed to preserve elite cohesion generally did not experience internal conflicts and managed to maintain or rebuild state capacity. By contrast, the places where elites were unable to preserve cohesion descended into violence. Elite disunity undermined the ability of post-Soviet states to properly address internal issues and preserve their monopoly on the use of force. This depended on the ability of the former nomenklatura and new elites to form coalitions, as well as the degree of internal fragmentation among the elites. State weakness encouraged separatist rebellions, especially given the institutionalization of ethnicity within the Soviet Union, as every movement that rebelled violently against the central government held titular subrepublican status. Meanwhile, state weakness rendered the usual asymmetry between states and rebel movements irrelevant in post-Soviet conflicts, making both function as "start-up firms."

== List ==
=== Central Asia ===
Conflict	Belligerents		Start	End	Detail	Fatalities
Tajikistani Civil War	Tajikistan; Popular Front of Tajikistan; Communist Party of Tajikistan; Socialist Party of Tajikistan; Russia; Uzbekistan; Kazakhstan; Kyrgyzstan; Supported by: Belarus (weapons supplies); UNMOT; Austria; Bangladesh; Bulgaria; Czech Republic; Denmark; Ghana; Hungary; Indonesia; Jordan; Nepal; Nigeria; Poland; Switzerland; Ukraine; Uruguay	United Tajik Opposition; Islamic Renaissance Party; Tajik Democratic Party; Party of People's Unity; Rastokhez Popular Movement; Lali Badakhshan; Afghanistan (until 1996); Jamiat-e Islami (until 1996); Supported by: al-Qaeda; (al-Qaeda) Islamic Movement of Uzbekistan; Taliban; Iran (alleged, denied by Iran)	5 May 1992	27 June 1997	Began when ethnic groups from the Gharm and Gorno-Badakhshan regions of Tajikistan, which were underrepresented in the ruling elite, rose up against the national government of President Rahmon Nabiyev, in which people from the Leninabad and Kulob regions dominated. The war ended with the signing of the General Agreement on the Establishment of Peace and National Accord in Tajikistan and the Moscow Protocol.	50,000–100,000 killed
Batken conflict	Kyrgyzstan; Russia (material support); Uzbekistan (military support)	Islamic Movement of Uzbekistan	30 July 1999	27 September 1999	Armed clashes between militants of the Islamic Movement of Uzbekistan (IMU) and the Armed Forces of Kyrgyzstan	1,182 killed
Andijan massacre	Government of Uzbekistan; National Security Service; Ministry of the Interior; People's Democratic Party of Uzbekistan; Armed Forces of the Republic of Uzbekistan; Uzbek Ground Forces	Protesters in Andijan; Alleged support: Hizb ut-Tahrir; Islamic Movement of Uzbekistan; Akromiya	13 May 2005		Protest and government massacre in the city of Andijan in Uzbekistan	187–1,500 killed
2010 Kyrgyz Revolution	Government of Kyrgyzstan; Armed Forces; Ministry of the Interior; State Committee for National Security; Ak Jol	SDPK; Respublika; Ata-Meken; Ar-Namys; Ata-Zhurt; United Kyrgyzstan	6 April 2010	15 April 2010	Also known as the People's April Revolution, the Melon Revolution or the April Events. Began with the ousting of Kyrgyz president Kurmanbek Bakiyev in the capital Bishkek. The violence ultimately led to the consolidation of a new parliamentary system in Kyrgyzstan.	400+ killed
2010 South Kyrgyzstan ethnic clashes	Kyrgyz provisional government; Supported by: Turkmenistan; Iran; Kazakhstan; China; Russia; Turkey; United States	Kyrgyzstani Kyrgyz gangs; Pro-Bakiyev Kyrgyz; Other pro-Bakiyev forces; Tajik PMCs; Tajikstani Tajiks; Russian Tajiks; Other mercenaries; Uzbekistani Kyrgyz^{1}; Sokh Uzbekistani Kyrgyz; Sogment Uzbekistani Kyrgyz; Islamic Movement of Uzbekistan (alleged); Kyrgyzstani Uzbeks; Pro-provisional government civilians; Uzbekistani Uzbek civilians^{1}; Sokh Uzbekistani Uzbeks; Sogment Uzbekistani Uzbeks; Uzbekistan (limited involv.)^{2}	19 May 2010	June 2010	Clashes between ethnic Kyrgyz and Uzbeks in southern Kyrgyzstan, primarily in the cities of Osh and Jalal-Abad, in the aftermath of the ouster of former President Kurmanbek Bakiyev on April 7.	393–893 killed
Insurgency in Gorno-Badakhshan (2010–2015)	Tajikistan; Armed Forces of Tajikistan	United Tajik Opposition; Islamic Movement of Uzbekistan; Islamic Renaissance Party of Tajikistan; Lali Badakhshan; Pamiris	19 September 2010	1 September 2015	Sporadic fighting in Tajikistan between rebel and government forces.	191–206 killed
Zhanaozen massacre	Government of Kazakhstan; Ministry of Internal Affairs; Internal Troops; Police; SOBR	Oil workers	16 December 2011	17 December 2011	Labor protest and government massacre in the city of Zhanaozen in Kazakhstan	14+ killed
2020 Dungan–Kazakh ethnic clashes	Ethnic Dungans	Ethnic Kazakhs	5 February 2020	8 February 2020	Clashes between ethnic Kazakhs and ethnic Dungans (a Muslim group with Chinese origins) in the village of Masanchi within the Korday District of Kazakhstan.	11 killed
2020 Kyrgyz Revolution	Government of Kyrgyzstan; Pro-government parties; Social Democratic Party of Kyrgyzstan; Birimdik; Mekenim Kyrgyzstan (factions); Kyrgyzstan party; Law enforcement	Protesters; People's Coordinating Council; Ata Meken Socialist Party; Bir Bol; Respublika; Reform Party; United Kyrgyzstan; Zamandash; Social Democrats; Chon Kazat; Iyman Nuru; Sadyr Japarov supporters; Mekenchil; Mekenim Kyrgyzstan (factions); Protesters	5 October 2020	15 October 2020	Revolution caused by alleged electoral fraud in the October 2020 Kyrgyz parliamentary election, government corruption, government response to the COVID-19 pandemic and arrest and conviction of former president Almazbek Atambayev on corruption charges.	1 killed
2021 Kyrgyzstan–Tajikistan clashes	Kyrgyzstan	Tajikistan	28 April 2021	1 May 2021	Clashes between Kyrgyzstan and Tajikistan over water dispute.	45 killed
2022 Kazakh unrest	Government of Kazakhstan; CSTO (Note: The Kazakh government claimed that the CSTO's operations were solely for peacekeeping purposes.)	Kazakh opposition Protesters	2 January 2022	11 January 2022	Protests across Kazakhstan that were sparked by an abrupt increase of gas prices, but have escalated into general protests. Kazakhstan's government has requested CSTO assistance in quelling the protests.	257 killed
2022 Karakalpak protests	Government of Uzbekistan; State Security Service; Ministry of the Interior; Uzbekistan Police; Armed Forces of the Republic of Uzbekistan; Uzbekistan National Guard; Supreme Council of Karakalpakstan	Karakalpakstan protesters	1 July 2022	3 July 2022	Over proposed amendments by President Shavkat Mirziyoyev to the Constitution of Uzbekistan which would have ended Karakalpakstan's status as an autonomous region of Uzbekistan and right to secede from Uzbekistan via referendum. A day after protests began in the Karakalpak capital of Nukus, Mirziyoyev withdrew the constitutional amendments. The Karakalpak government said that protesters had attempted to storm government buildings.	21 killed
2022 Kyrgyzstan–Tajikistan clashes	Kyrgyzstan	Tajikistan; Afghan mujahids (per Kyrgyzstan)	27 January 2022	20 September 2022	Clashes between Kyrgyzstan and Tajikistan	146 killed
Afghanistan–Tajikistan border skirmishes	Afghanistan; Tajikistan Jamaat Ansarullah; Other anti-Tajikistan militants	Tajikistan; National Resistance Front; Other anti-Taliban militants	15 May 2022	Present	Occasional skirmishes have occurred along the Afghanistan–Tajikistan border between the Taliban-led Afghan Armed Forces and Tajikistani Border Troops.	8–10 killed

=== Caucasus ===
==== North Caucasus ====
Map of the Caucasus, showing unrecognized breakaway states (Abkhazia and South Ossetia) within Georgia as a result of the Russo-Georgian War in 2008. These areas are regarded by the international community as being occupied by Russia.

Conflict	Belligerents		Start	End	Detail	Fatalities
East Prigorodny conflict	North Ossetia; Russian Federation	(Ingushetia) Ingush rebels	30 October 1992	6 November 1992	Inter-ethnic conflict in the Eastern part of the Prigorodny district.	600 killed
First Chechen War	Russian Government; Loyalist opposition	Chechen Republic of Ichkeria; Foreign volunteers: Foreign Mujahideen; UNA-UNSO; UNSO's "Argo" squad; Viking Brigade; Grey Wolves	11 December 1994	31 August 1996	Russian troops invaded after Chechnya declared independence, but withdrew in 1996 leading to a de facto Chechen independence.	46,500 killed
War in Dagestan (1999)	Russia; Armed Forces; Army; Navy; Air Force; VDV; Spetsnaz GRU; FSB; MVD; Militsiya; Internal Troops; OMON; SOBR; Dagestan; (Dagestan) Dagestani police and local militia	Islamic Djamaat of Dagestan; CPID; Chechnya; IIPB; SPIR; Religious Police	7 August 1999	14 September 1999	The Islamic International Brigade invaded the neighbouring Russian republic of Dagestan in support of the Shura of Dagestan separatist movement.	2,775 killed
Second Chechen War	Russia; Provisional Council (until 2000); Chechen Republic (from 2000)	Chechen Republic of Ichkeria (1999–2007); Caucasian Front (2005–2007); Caucasus Emirate (2007–2009); North Caucasian volunteers; Mujahideen; Grey Wolves	7 August 1999	16 April 2009	Russia restores federal control of Chechnya.	20,500 killed
Insurgency in Ingushetia	Russia; Ingushetia	Chechen Republic of Ichkeria (until Oct 2007); Caucasian Front (until Oct 2007); Caucasus Emirate (from Oct 2007); Vilayat Galgayche (from Oct 2007); (Ingushetia) Ingush opposition (2007–2008); ad hoc revenge groups	21 July 2007	19 May 2015	Separatist insurgency in Ingushetia.	871 killed
Insurgency in the North Caucasus	Russia: Astrakhan Oblast; Bashkortostan; Chechnya; Dagestan; Ingushetia; Kabardino-Balkaria; Karachay-Cherkessia; Moscow; North Ossetia–Alania; Novgorod Oblast; Saint Petersburg; Stavropol Krai; Volgograd Oblast; Kadyrovtsy; Other loyalists	Caucasus Emirate (2009–17): Vilayat Dagestan; Vilayat Galgayche; Vilayat Iriston (2009); Vilayat KBK (2009–17); Vilayat Nokhchicho; Riyad-us Saliheen Brigade (2009–16); Arab Mujahideen (2009–12); Turkish Mujahideen (2009–17); Imam Shamil Battalion (2017); Islamic State; Wilayat al-Qawqaz	16 April 2009	19 December 2017	Separatist insurgency in Chechnya, Dagestan, and other parts of the North Caucasus region.	3,500 killed
Islamic State insurgency in the North Caucasus	Russia: Chechnya; Dagestan; Ingushetia; Kabardino-Balkaria; Kalmykia; Karachay-Cherkessia; North Ossetia–Alania; Adygea; Krasnodar Krai; Rostov Oblast; Stavropol Krai; Volgograd Oblast; Moscow Oblast; Moscow; Azerbaijan: Qusar District; Georgia: Adjara; Tbilisi	Islamic State: Caucasus Province; Khorasan Province; Azerbaijan Province; al-Qaeda: Imam Shamil Battalion (2017-2019); Other Islamist groups and lone wolves	20 December 2017	Present	Ongoing terror activity of the Islamic State branch in the North Caucasus after the insurgency of the Caucasus Emirate.	250+ killed

==== South Caucasus ====
Conflict	Belligerents		Start	End	Detail	Fatalities
First Nagorno-Karabakh War	Azerbaijan (from 1991); Soviet Union (until 1991) (Note: Soviet authorities generally sided with Azerbaijan over Nagorno-Karabakh. Soviet troops were present in Nagorno-Karabakh for 2 1/2 years and supported Azerbaijani militias. Soviet troops directly intervened during Operation Ring in April–May 1991 on the Azerbaijani side.); Azerbaijan SSR; Foreign groups: Hezbe Wahdat; Hezb-e-Islami; Grey Wolves; Chechen volunteers; UNA-UNSO; Slavic mercenaries; Turkish volunteers	Nagorno-Karabakh (Note: Nagorno-Karabakh Autonomous Oblast (NKAO) until 1991.); Armenia (Note: Armenian Soviet Socialist Republic (Soviet Armenia) until 1990 (renamed Republic of Armenia)/1991 (declared independence).); Armenian Revolutionary Federation; Foreign groups: Kuban Cossacks; Ossetian volunteers; Slavic mercenaries	20 February 1988	12 May 1994	The secessionist conflict leads to de facto independence of Republic of Artsakh (Nagorno-Karabakh Republic).	28,000–38,000 killed
South Ossetia war (1991–1992)	(Georgia (country)) Georgia	South Ossetia; Russia; (1992)	5 January 1991	24 June 1992	The separatist conflict leads to South Ossetia's de facto independence from Georgia.	1,000 killed
Georgian Civil War: 1991–1992 Georgian coup d'état	(Georgia (country)) Zviadists: 22 Dec 1991 – 6 Jan 1992; (Georgia (country)) Government of Georgia; National Guard of Georgia; 6 Jan 1992 – Mar 1992; (Georgia (country)) National Disobedience Committee; Mar 1992 – Sep 1993; (Georgia (country)) Gamsakhurdia's government-in-exile; Partisans; Units of the National Guard; 2 Sep 1993 – 6 Nov 1993; (Georgia (country)) Zugdidi-based government of Gamsakhurdia 6 Nov 1993 – 31 Dec 1993 (Georgia (country)) Partisans; Supported by: Chechen Republic of Ichkeria	(Georgia (country)) Pro-Shevardnadze forces: 22 Dec 1991 – 6 Jan 1992; (Georgia (country)) Rebel factions of the National Guard; Mkhedrioni; Tetri Artsivi; Merab Kostava Society; Union of Afghans; 2 Jan 1992 – 10 Mar 1992; (Georgia (country)) Military Council; Interim Government; 10 Mar 1992 – Oct 1992; (Georgia (country)) State Council; Interim Government; Oct 1992 – 31 Dec 1993; (Georgia (country)) Government of Georgia; Georgian Armed Forces; Internal Troops of Georgia; National Guard of Georgia; Supported by: Russia	22 December 1991	31 December 1993	A civil war leads to the overthrow of the first President of Georgia Zviad Gamsakhurdia and his replacement with new President Eduard Shevardnadze.	2,000 killed
War in Abkhazia (1992–1993)	Georgia	Abkhazia; Confederation of Mountain Peoples of the Caucasus; Supported by: Russia (Note: See Russia's role in the conflict section for more details)	14 August 1992	30 September 1993 (Note: Ceasefire agreement was signed on 1 December 1993, although fighting continued during 1994.)	Abkhaz separatism leads to the de facto independence of Abkhazia from Georgia.	10,000–30,000 killed
1993 Azerbaijani coup d'état	Huseynov militia; Supported by: Russia	Azerbaijani Government; APFP	4 June 1993	15 June 1993	A mutiny against Azerbaijani President Abulfaz Elchibey replaces him with Heydar Aliyev	Unknown
1994 Azerbaijani coup attempt	Huseynov militia; Supported by: Russia	Government of Azerbaijan; Azerbaijani Armed Forces	3 October 1994	5 October 1994	The government troops thwart a coup led by Prime Minister Surat Huseynov against President Heydar Aliyev after he signed a deal with the Western consortium to explore three oil fields in the Caspian Sea, which angered Russia. Huseynov previously led a coup in 1993 to install Aliyev in power.	None
1995 Azerbaijani coup attempt	Special Purpose Police Unit; Turkish putschists; Supported by: Nationalist Movement Party	Government of Azerbaijan; Azerbaijani Armed Forces; Supported by: Government of Turkey; Russia	13 March 1995	17 March 1995	A failed attempt to reinstall former president Abulfaz Elchibey	31 killed
War in Abkhazia (1998)	Georgian insurgents; White Legion; Mkhedrioni; Forest Brothers	Abkhazia	18 May 1998	26 May 1998	Ethnic Georgians in Abkhazia launched an insurgency against the Abkhazian secessionist government.	100 killed
1998 Georgian attempted mutiny	Georgian Government; Georgian Army; Georgian Police	Mutineers from the Senaki Military Brigade; Zviadists	18 October 1998	19 October 1998	An abortive mutiny led by pro-Gamsakhurdia officers from the Senaki Military Brigade to remove new President Eduard Shevardnadze from power.	5 killed
2001 Kodori crisis	Chechen division under Gelayev; Georgian guerrillas	Abkhazia; Abkhaz military	4 October 2001	18 October 2001	Georgian guerrillas unsuccessfully try to regain control over Abkhazia with the help of Chechen fighters.	At least 40 killed
Pankisi Gorge crisis	(Georgia (country)) Georgia; Supported by: United States; Russia	(Chechen Republic of Ichkeria) Chechen militants; Mujahideen in Chechnya; Other jihadists	November 2000	October 2002 (Note: The International Crisis Behaviour Project at Duke University defines the crisis as having lasted from 27 July 2002, the date of an attack by Chechen separatists on Russian forces at Itum-Kale in Russia, to 7 October 2002, when Russia and Georgia agreed to joint patrols on their mutual border. This period also included Russian airstrikes on Georgian territory, Georgia's most consequential security operation in the Gorge, and the final exit of Ruslan Gelayev. There had been an armed separatist presence in the Gorge since 1999, and Russia's forceful objections begun, at the latest, in November 2002. Russia's first coercive measures against Georgia took place the next month.)	An incursion by Al-Qaeda forces into Georgia on behalf of Chechen rebels fighting in the North Caucasus. They were forced out in 2004 by Georgian forces with American and Russian backing.	Unknown
2004 South Ossetian clashes	(Georgia (country)) Georgia	South Ossetia; Russia	7 July 2004	5 November 2004	Clashes between Georgian and South Ossetian troops result in several deaths.	22 killed
2006 Kodori crisis	(Georgia (country)) Georgia; Interior Ministry; Georgian Police	(Georgia (country)) Monadire	22 July 2006	28 July 2006	Georgian police and special forces drive a local rebellious militia out of the Georgian-controlled Kodori Valley in Abkhazia.	1 killed
Russo-Georgian War	Russia; South Ossetia (Note: South Ossetia's status is disputed. It considers itself to be an independent state, but this is recognised by only a few other countries. The Georgian government and most of the world's other states consider South Ossetia de jure a part of Georgia's territory.); Abkhazia (Note: The political status of Abkhazia is disputed. Having unilaterally declared independence from Georgia in 1992, Abkhazia is formally recognised as an independent state by 4 UN member states (three other states previously recognised it but then withdrew their recognition), while the remainder of the international community recognizes it as de jure Georgian territory. Georgia continues to claim the area as its own territory, designating it as Russian-occupied territory.)	Georgia	1 August 2008	16 August 2008	A war between Georgia on one side and Russia, South Ossetia and Abkhazia on the other side confirms the de facto independence of Abkhazia and South Ossetia and leads to their recognition by Russia and Nicaragua.	500 killed
2009 Georgian mutiny	Georgian Army; Georgian Police	Mutineers from the Mukhrovani Separate Tank Battalion	5 May 2009	5 May 2009	An alleged abortive mutiny by a Georgian Army tank battalion based in Mukhrovani village with a goal of removing President Saakashvili from power.	None killed
2010 Mardakert clashes	Azerbaijan	Nagorno-Karabakh; Armenia	18 June 2010	1 September 2010	Sporadic border war on the Armenian–Azerbaijan border and at the line of contact between the Nagorno-Karabakh and Azerbaijan.	7–8 killed
2016 Nagorno-Karabakh conflict	Azerbaijan	Artsakh; Armenia	1 April 2016	5 April 2016	Armenian and Azerbaijani forces fight a four-day long conflict along the border of the unrecognized Republic of Artsakh. Azerbaijani forces make minor territorial gains, some of which are retaken by Armenian forces before the end of the conflict.	400–1,600 killed
July 2020 Armenian–Azerbaijani clashes	Azerbaijan	Armenia	12 July 2020	16 July 2020	Armenian and Azerbaijani forces engage in border clashes along the Tavush Province of Armenia and Tovuz District of Azerbaijan. The death of Azerbaijani major general Polad Hashimov sparks the July 2020 Azerbaijani protests. Turkey and Azerbaijan organize large-scale military exercises following the clashes, and tensions persist until the beginning of the Second Nagorno-Karabakh War 2 months later.	29–133 killed
Second Nagorno-Karabakh War	Azerbaijan; Turkey (alleged by Armenia); (Syrian opposition) Syrian mercenaries (Note: Denied by Azerbaijan and Turkey.)	Artsakh; Armenia	27 September 2020	10 November 2020	Azerbaijan retakes most of the territories previously controlled by the Republic of Artsakh. Russian peacekeepers introduced into the remaining disputed area.	7,000 killed
Armenia–Azerbaijan border crisis	Azerbaijan	Armenia	12 May 2021	Present	Border clashes between Azerbaijan and Armenia.	353 killed
Blockade of Nagorno-Karabakh	Azerbaijan	(Russia) Russian peacekeepers; Artsakh	12 December 2022	30 September 2023	Azerbaijan blockades the Republic of Artsakh.	Unknown
2023 Azerbaijani offensive in Nagorno-Karabakh	Azerbaijan	Artsakh	19 September 2023	20 September 2023	Azerbaijan launches an attack on the Republic of Artsakh after nine months of blockade. The Artsakh Defence Army disbands, the government of the Republic of Artsakh agrees to dissolve itself entirely by January 1, 2024, and almost the entire population of Artsakh flees to Armenia.	200 killed
Islamic State insurgency in Azerbaijan	Azerbaijan; Russia	Islamic State; Derbent Jamaat remnants	2 July 2019	Present	An low-level insurgency in Azerbaijan, mainly the Qusar District.	1-8 killed

=== Eastern Europe ===
Conflict	Belligerents		Start	End	Detail	Fatalities
Gagauzia conflict	Gagauz Republic	(Moldavian Soviet Socialist Republic) Moldavian SSR (until 1991); Moldova (from 1991)	12 November 1989	14 January 1995	Ended in the reintegration of Gagauzia into Moldova as an autonomous region.	Unknown
Transnistria War	Transnistria; Russia; Supported by: Ukraine	Moldova (Note: Soviet Socialist Republic of Moldova until 23 May 1991. Constituent republic of the Soviet Union until 27 August 1991.); Supported by: Romania	2 November 1990	21 July 1992	Separatism in Transnistria leads to its de-facto secession from Moldova with Russian backing.	1,000 killed
1993 Russian constitutional crisis	(Russia) Presidential forces: Main Administration of Protection; Ministry of the Interior; Ministry of Defence; Kantemir Division; Taman Division; Pro-Yeltsin demonstrators and organizations; (Russia) Federalists and anti-communists; Diplomatic support: Poland; Czech Republic; Romania; Slovakia; Hungary; Bulgaria; Estonia; Latvia; Lithuania; Moldova; Ukraine; Georgia; Armenia; Azerbaijan; Kazakhstan; Kyrgyzstan; Uzbekistan; Tajikistan; Australia; Canada; Germany; India; Israel; Italy; Japan; South Korea; New Zealand; United Kingdom; United States; European Economic Community; NATO	(Russia) Parliamentary forces; Congress of People's Deputies; Supreme Soviet; Anti-Yeltsin opposition; National Salvation Front; Russian National Unity; Labour Russia; Other opposition forces (Note: Supporters of Alexander Rutskoy, the Supreme Soviet and the Congress of People's Deputies frequently used those flags. The Russian tricolor itself only remained hoisted at the White House building (see video documentary).); Support: Transnistria (Note: Transnistria is a separatist and internationally unrecognized de facto state, regarded as Moldovan territory by all United Nations members.)	21 September 1993	4 October 1993	Political stand-off between the Russian president and the Russian parliament that was resolved by using military force.	147 killed
Euromaidan and the Revolution of Dignity	Government of Ukraine; Ministry of Internal Affairs; Berkut; Internal Troops; Militsiya; Security Service; Alpha Group; Pro-government groups; Pro-government civilian protestors (Note: Reports of some protesters attending under duress from superiors); Hired supporters; Titushky (Note: Titushky are provocators during protests.); Militant groups: Red Sector; Donbas People's Militia; Ukrainian Front; Don Cossacks; Night Wolves; Parties; Pro-government; Party of Regions; Supported by: Russia	Anti-government protesters; Maidan People's Union; AutoMaidan; Vidsich; Batkivshchyna; Svoboda; UDAR; Right Sector; UNA–UNSO; Other groups; Mejlis of the Crimean Tatar People; Democratic Alliance; United Left and Peasants; Spilna Sprava; Congress of Ukrainian Nationalists; Misanthropic Division; Unafilliated protesters; Defected police officers; Afghan War veterans; University students; Anti-government but anti-protest parties; Communist Party (Note: Early November 2012 Communist Party party leader Petro Symonenko stated that his party will not co-operate with other parties in the new parliament elected in the 2012 Ukrainian parliamentary election. Nevertheless, in at the time in parliament its parliamentary faction usually voted similarly to the Party of Regions parliamentary faction.); Socialist Party; Russian Bloc; Russian Unity; Progressive Socialist Party; Labour Ukraine; People's Democratic Party; Ukraine – Forward!	21 November 2013	22 February 2014	Euromaidan is the name given to civil unrest that started when the Ukrainian government cancelled an association agreement with the EU in favour of closer ties with Russia. The protests escalated and led to the Revolution of Dignity, which toppled the Ukrainian government.	121 killed
Russian invasion of Crimea	Russia	Ukraine	27 February 2014 (Note: There are "some contradictions and inherent problems" regarding the date on which the Russian operation began. The Ukrainian Government maintains, and the European Court of Human Rights agrees, that Russia controlled Crimea from 27 February 2014, when unmarked Russian special forces took control of its political institutions. The Russian Government later made 27 February "Special Operations Forces Day". In 2015, the Ukrainian parliament officially designated 20 February 2014 as "the beginning of the temporary occupation of Crimea and Sevastopol by Russia", citing the date inscribed on the Russian medal "For the Return of Crimea". In 2018, Russian Foreign Minister Sergey Lavrov claimed that the earlier "start date" on the medal was due to a "technical misunderstanding". President Putin stated in a film about the annexation that he ordered the operation to "restore" Crimea to Russia following an all-night emergency meeting on 22–23 February 2014.)	26 March 2014	In February 2014, Russia invaded Crimea. In March, following the takeover of Crimea by pro-Russian separatists and Russian Armed Forces, a referendum (not recognised by the new Ukrainian authorities) was held on the issue of reunification with Russia. This took place in the aftermath of the Revolution of Dignity. Russia then annexed Crimea on 18 March.	3 killed
2014 pro-Russian unrest in Ukraine	(Donetsk People's Republic) (Luhansk People's Republic) Pro-Russian separatists Russia	Ukraine	23 February 2014	2 May 2014	As a result of the revolution in Kyiv, a pro-Russian unrest in the eastern regions of the country escalated into mass protests and violence between those supporting and opposing the new authorities. In Crimea, the events served as a pretext for a Russian annexation of the region. In Donbas, the situation quickly escalated into a war. Protests in other regions included seizure of government buildings in Kharkiv and deadly clashes in Odesa.	Unknown
War in Donbas	Donetsk PR Luhansk PR Russia	Ukraine	12 April 2014	24 February 2022 (Note: War escalated as Russia invaded Ukraine on 24 February 2022, however the term "war in Donbas" is not generally used for events occurring after the invasion started.)	As a result of the unrest, a full-fledged war began in the Ukrainian Donetsk and Luhansk oblasts, known collectively as Donbas. The separatist republics were proclaimed and captured a strip of land on the border with Russia. Major combat ended with the signing of the second Minsk agreements in early 2015, with a stalemate lasting until the start of the full-scale invasion by Russia of February 2022.	14,000 killed
Russian invasion of Ukraine	Russia; Donetsk PR (Note: The Donetsk People's Republic and the Luhansk People's Republic were Russian puppet states, having declared their independence from Ukraine in May 2014. Several months into the invasion, Russia declared that it had formally annexed both entities in September 2022. They continue to exist as republics of Russia.); Luhansk PR; Belarus (Note: In 2022, Belarus allowed Russia to use its territory to launch the invasion and to launch missiles into Ukraine.); North Korea	Ukraine	24 February 2022	Present	On 24 February 2022, the War in Donbas escalated when Russian government forces began bombing Ukrainian cities. After the bombings, Russian troops launched an operation on Ukrainian soil and began sending in troops on Ukrainian territory, launching a 'full-scale' invasion. This invasion was supported militarily by the separatist Donetsk People's Republic and Luhansk People's Republic and non-militarily by Belarus. Ukraine received military aid from the United States, the European Union, the United Kingdom, Australia, Canada, and other countries from the Western world. On 30 September 2022, Russia, amid an ongoing invasion, annexed four oblasts of Ukraine – Luhansk, Donetsk, Zaporizhzhia and Kherson, which were not fully under Russian control at the time. The annexation is the largest in Europe since World War II, surpassing Russia's 2014 annexation of Crimea.	See fatalities
2023 Belgorod Oblast incursions	Russia	Russian opposition; Belarusian opposition; Polish militant groups; Chechen militant groups; Ukraine (alleged by Russia)	22 May 2023	17 December 2023	Pro-Ukrainian armed rebels invasion of Russia	Unknown
Wagner Group rebellion	Russia; Ministry of Defense; Armed Forces; FSB; National Guard; Kadyrovites	PMC Wagner	23 June 2023	24 June 2023	Mutiny of Wagner PMC against the Russian government	15–31 killed
March 2024 western Russia incursion	Russia	Ukraine; Russian opposition	12 March 2024	7 April 2024	Pro-Ukrainian Groups And Russian Opposition Groups Invading Western Russia In The Belgorod And Kursk Oblasts	Unknown (both sides casualties are highly inflated)
Kursk offensive (2024–2025)	Russia; North Korea (Note: From November 2024)	Ukraine	6 August 2024	16 March 2025	Ukrainian occupation of Kursk Oblast	Around 20,000-30,000 Killed and Wounded

== Sources ==
- Subotic, Milovan R.; Cioculescu, Șerban Filip (2023). "Frozen Conflicts as a Tool of the Russian Hybrid Warfare in the Post-Soviet Space". Strategic Intersections The New Architecture of International Security. ISBN 9788681121320.
- Marsili, Marco (2025). "Soviet Nationality Conflict: Structural Legacies and Ethnic Conflicts and in the Post-Soviet Space" (PDF). Review of Human Rights. 11 (1).

== See also ==
- List of wars: 1990–2002
- List of wars: 2003–present
  - Second Cold War
- Community for Democracy and Rights of Nations
