= Guerrilla phase of the Second Chechen War (2005) =

Part of a Russian war in the Caucasus

== Timeline ==
=== January ===
- January 2 - A three-day battle on a mountain near Gimry in Dagestan between some 3,000 Russian troops and a group of estimated eight armed rebels left three servicemen dead and more than 10 wounded, with no rebel losses.
- January 5 - A series of incidents over the previous two days killed 14 Russian soldiers and three policemen and wounded 15 others in Chechnya.
- January 8 - Four to five rebels were killed when the federal and republican forces stormed and destroyed a building in Nazran, Ingushetia.
- January 15 - Four Russian commandos and six rebels were killed in a siege and police raid in Dagestan; two people were wounded and one militant captured. Chechen rebel leader Aslan Maskhadov issued a special order to stop all offensive operations both inside and outside Chechnya until the end of February as a gesture of goodwill.
- January 25 - Seven Russian soldiers were killed and 11 wounded in attacks and explosions across Chechnya.
- January 27 - Seven people, including three women, died in the shoot-out between the Russian security forces and suspected Islamic militants in Nalchik, Kabardino-Balkaria. Russian military spokesman said that a "terrorist base" was destroyed and six militants, including two "Arab mercenaries," were killed in southeastern Chechnya. A local rebel leader was also killed in Grozny, while another militant was captured.
- January 29 - Nine Chechen presidential guards or Russian federal troops (conflicting reports) were killed by a series of remote-controlled landmine explosions on the Caucasus federal highway near the villages of Alkhan-Kala.

=== February ===
- February 1 - Three Russian servicemen were killed and one wounded in an attack near on a mountain road near the village of Gorgachi, while two militants were killed in Grozny.
- February 2 - The rebels ambushed motorcade of Major-General Magomed Omarov, Dagestan's deputy interior minister, and killed him in the shoot-out in capital Makhachkala.
- February 19 - A spokesman for the Russian Army said Yunadi Turchayev, the alleged amir of Grozny responsible for operations in and around the Chechen capital, and an unspecified number of his men were killed in a shootout in Grozny.
- February 20 - Three guerrillas were killed and five suspects detained during a two-day operation by security forces in an apartment building in Nalchik, Kabardino-Balkaria.
- February 21 - Nine Russian reconnaissance soldiers were killed in a blast in the village of Prigorodnoye on the outskirts of Grozny. While official sources attributed the incident to a battle with Chechen guerrillas, who at the time announced a unilateral ceasefire, Russian newspaper Novaya Gazeta wrote that some of the soldiers were drunk and one of them fired a grenade launcher in an abandoned factory.

=== March ===
- March 8 - Chechen separatist President Aslan Maskhadov was killed and several of his associates captured in Tolstoy-Yurt.
- March 10 - A Mi-8 helicopter belonging to the FSB was brought down by gunfire killing 15 servicemen, including spetsnaz operatives.
- March 13 - Reported death of Khanpasha Movsarov, alleged imam of the militant group in Grozny and coordinator of rebel operations in the capital.
- March 22 - A Mi-8 helicopter of the Russian Interior Ministry crashed near the village of Oktyabrskoye. Two people died in the hospital, according to Russian sources.
- March 23 - Chechen rebel field commander Rizvan Chitigov was killed by Chechen police forces in Shalinsky District. On the same day, police Lieutenant-Colonel Movsredin Kantayev, the head of an operational-investigative bureau of the Russian Interior Ministry, was found shot dead near the village of Petropavlovskaya.

=== April ===
- April 5 - Two guerrillas and a small child were killed in an operation carried out by Dagestani and Chechen security forces in the Dagestani town of Khasavyurt.
- April 15 - A fierce skirmish took place between Chechen guerrillas and Russian elite forces in Grozny's Leninsky city district. Reportedly six Chechen fighters from Doku Umarov's group were killed, while five spetsnaz soldiers were killed and two seriously wounded. There were some civilian casualties.
- April 20 - Federal forces and Chechen and Dagestani police conducted a joint operation in the Dagestani village of Batash, killing three alleged guerrillas.
- April 29 - Four guerrillas were killed in a shoot-out in Nalchik, Kabardino-Balkaria.

=== May ===
- May 15 - During a raid in a suburb of Grozny, Russian forces killed four militants, including Vakha Arsanov, former vice president of the Maskhadov's government. Also on same day, the Chechen guerrilla commander Danilbek Eskiyev was killed in the village of Gerzel in Gudermessky District, and six local guerrillas were killed in an overnight police operation in an apartment building in Cherkessk, capital of the Karachay–Cherkessia.
- May 17 - Senior insurgent leader Alash Daudov and three associates were killed by the FSB spetsnaz in Grozny. On the same day the Special Forces also announced the killing of Rasul Tambulatov, militant commander for Chechnya's Shelkovsky District, and the capture of five of his associates who they said were bomb specialists.
- May 23 - Two powerful roadside bombs blasted a column of the MVD troops, wounding 13 servicemen including two top commanders. During a search for the attackers a reconnaissance unit soldier was blown up by a mine in the nearby forest.

=== June ===
- June 9 - Seven policemen from the Russian region of Tver deployed in Chechnya were killed when guerrillas ambushed their vehicle on the Kurchaloy-Avtury road.
- June 28 - Magomedzagid Varisov, a political scientist and journalist, was killed near his home in Makhachkala. He "had received threats, was being followed and had unsuccessfully sought help from the local police" according to Committee to Protect Journalists who largely condemned the killing.

=== July ===
- July 1 - Eleven members of the elite Russian MVD Rus battalion were killed and twenty other wounded in the bomb attack in Makhachkala, Dagestan.
- July 4 - an attack by the Chechen rebel fighters armed with assault rifles, grenade launchers and rocket propelled grenades on a motorized column of the GRU Spetsnaz 16th Brigade from Tambov, composed of several trucks and one armoured personnel carrier killed at least six to seven servicemen and wounding as many as 12 to 20 others, according to the Russian sources.
- July 5 - Six Russian soldiers were killed and at least 10 to 25 others injured when gunmen attacked a military convoy in the Shali district of Chechnya. Pro-rebel web sites claimed more than 20 soldiers were killed.
- July 10 - At least one Interior Ministry serviceman was killed and nine were wounded in a grenade and gun attack on their vehicles in Grozny's Staropromyslovsky district (the rebels had claimed that 15-20 Russian servicemen were killed in the incident). A local policeman was shot dead in the Chechen village of Kargalinskaya.
- July 11 - Sharia Jamaat, the main Dagestani rebel group, confirmed the death of its commander, Rasul Makasharipov. 10 policemen were killed and 14 injured in attacks and a mine blast in Chechnya.
- July 16 - A military Mi-8 helicopter crashed in the highland Chechnya, killing eight servicemen.
- July 19 - Eleven policemen, a local FSB agent and three civilians were killed when a booby-trapped police vehicle was blown up in the northwestern Chechen village of Znamenskoye. Nearly thirty others were injured. The initial firefight was designed to draw more policemen to the scene and maximise casualties with an explosion.

=== August ===
- August 7 - Nine Russian soldiers were killed and nine more wounded in weekend clashes.
- August 14 - Colonel Aleksandr Kayak, the commander of the Urus-Martan area, his deputy, Lt.-Col. Sergey Donets, and three other soldiers were killed in a land mine explosion, when the Russian troops came to the aid of a local official whose home was under attack.
- August 25 - Dagestani Prime Minister Ibragim Malsagov was wounded in a double bomb attack on his motorcade in Nazran which killed his driver and wounded his bodyguard.
- August 25 - Six Russian soldiers had been killed and six wounded in the attacks and mine blast. Five Chechen policemen were also wounded, and one rebel was killed and another captured.
- August 30 - Three servicemen, including a Russian bomb expert, were killed and seven others wounded in a series of rebel attacks and mine blasts.

=== September ===
- September 2 - One killed and nine injured in a bomb attack on the military patrol in Makhachkala, the capital Dagestan.
- September 4 - Russian military said two rebels were killed and three soldiers wounded in a fight in Vedenski District. One servicemen was killed and eight wounded in three clashes in Chechnya. Three rebels were also captured.
- September 7 - Rebel commander Magomed Vagapov and two other guerrillas reportedly killed in Chechnya. In Dagestan three police officers were shot dead at a checkpoint on a road leading to Makhachkala.
- September 12 - Akhmed Avtorkhanov, former head of security for Ichkerian President Aslan Maskhadov, was killed in Chechnya.
- September 14 - Chechen police and guerrillas clashed in the town of Argun, with several dead on both sides including Shamil Muskiyev, deputy leader of the Chechen resistance. About ten people, mostly officers, were wounded when guerrillas attacked the building of the Interior Ministry of the Chechen Republic in the center of Grozny.
- September 15 - A gun battle between local and Russian police and Chechen separatists barricaded in a building in Argun led to the deaths of five police officers and five rebels. Meanwhile, three other servicemen were killed and six injured in a separate attacks.
- September 17 - Seven policemen were killed and five wounded in Chechnya, five of them in fighting in the villages of Dargo and Tezin-Kala.
- September 18 - According to conflicting reports, one to 11 servicemen were killed and up to 12 others wounded in Chechnya.
- September 20 - Three policemen were shot dead in the village of Karabulak, Ingushetia.
- September 24 - Six Russian soldiers and one Chechen policeman were killed and 11 others wounded in Chechnya in the previous 24 hours.
- September 26 - Nine Russian soldiers died in Chechnya, mostly fighting militants near the village of Bugovroi.
- September 29 - Two policemen and two children were shot dead in an attack by unknown perpetrators in Grozny.

=== October ===
- October 9 - Chechen guerrilla commander Ruslan Nasipov and one of his men were killed in Grozny. Four guerrillas and two policemen were killed in a clash in Makhachkala, Dagestan, Russian sources reported.
- October 13 - Large group of mostly-local militants attack Nalchik, the capital of Kabardino-Balkaria. More than 100 people, including at least 14 civilians and 35 policemen, were reported to have been killed and many were wounded.
- October 20 - Unknown militants attempted to assassinate Ibragim Temirbayev, the mayor of Argun, injuring four of his bodyguards.

=== November ===
- November 2–4 - Five policemen and a local FSB agent were shot dead in six separate gun attacks in Nazran, Ingushetia. Three servicemen were killed and three wounded in Chechnya, while a Chechen rebel was also captured and an alleged Dagestani rebel killed in Khasavyurt.

=== December ===
- December 16 - Saudi Arabia-born "Imam of the Chechen mujahideen" Abu Omar al-Saif was announced killed having been in November in Dagestan.
