= Derbent Jamaat =

Islamist Jihadist group based in the Russian republic of Dagestan

- Flag of the Caucasus Emirate
- Leaders: Rappani Khalilov †; Abdul Madzhid †; Magomed Vagabov †; Israpil Velijanov †; Kamaldin Kazimagomedov †; Hasan Abdullaev †
- Dates active: 2007 – 5 November 2016
- Active regions: Russian North Caucasus (Dagestan)
- Part of: Shariat Jamaat
- Wars: Insurgency in the North Caucasus; 2008 Abu Bakr Mosque Bombing; Operation Eagle

Derbent Jamaat (Russian: Дербентский джамаат), also known as the Forest Brothers (Russian: Лесные братья, Azerbaijani: Meşə qardaşları), and the Southern Group (Russian: Группировка «Южная»), was an Islamist Jihadist group based in the Russian republic of Dagestan, part of the Shariat Jamaat of the Caucasus Emirate. The group had engaged in attacks on law enforcement officers, organized terrorist attacks, distributed Wahhabi literature, and undertook propaganda and agitation activities in Dagestan and the neighboring country of Azerbaijan.

The group was created and headed by Rappani Khalilov until his death in September 2007. He was succeeded by emir Abdul Madzhid. Participant of the Chechen Wars, Madzhid was killed in September 2008 and was replaced by Israpil Velijanov. After the death of Velijanov in April 2011, the Derbent Jamaat became disoriented, though it remained active until its remaining members were killed in November 2016.

== History ==
The group was created and headed by Rappani Khalilov until his death in September 2007. Then, Ilgar Mollachiev, better known as emir Abdul Madzhid, a native of the Zagatala District of Azerbaijan was appointed the commander of the Derbent Jamaat. According to the Russian FSB's Dagestani department, Malachiev participated in the First and Second Chechen Wars, and underwent combat training in the detachments commanded by Saudi mujahideen Ibn al-Khattab and Abu al-Walid. In 2006, emir Dokka Umarov sent Malachiev to Dagestan to coordinate the activities of groups of militants.

In January 2008, the Russian forces launched their first operation on the Derbent Jamaat in Tabasaransky District. During the operation, six out of fifteen militants were killed, while the others managed to escape. In March of the same year, the Russian FSB's Dagestani department and forces of the Russian Ministry of Internal Affairs launched an operation against the group in Dagestanskiye Ogni, killing three militants. On 17 August, according to the Ministry of National Security of Azerbaijan, the group staged an attack on the Abu Bakr Mosque in Baku. Three people were killed and eleven more were injured when the perpetrators threw a grenade through a window of the mosque. The Azerbaijani security services then stated that seventeen militants of the group o to Azerbaijan through Russia to create a new jamaat in Sumgayit and they were arrested. The attack on the mosque was followed by an Azerbaijani response. Azerbaijani internal troops launched the Operation Eagle on 29 August. On that day, fighting erupted between the Azerbaijani servicemen and the group's militants in Qusar, resulting in the death of one Azerbaijani serviceman and the injury of another. Azerbaijani security services were able to locate and kill three of the militants on 6 September, but their leader, Abdul Madzhid, managed to escape.

On 7 September, the Russian FSB located and killed Abdul Madzhid, as well as two other militants. Then, Astarkhan Rustamkhanov, another commander of the group, was also killed by the Russian security forces. After his death, Zakir Novruzov became the group's leader. On 17 September, the Russian security forces killed another ten militants of the group in southern territories of Dagestan, while an FSB special forces serviceman was killed, and another law enforcement officer was wounded. Israpil Velijanov, also known as Emir Hassan, soon took command of the group and in late September, Russian OMON units attacked his forces in Tabasaransky District. The following clashes in Sirtich resulted in the deaths of three Russian OMON servicemen, while the militants managed to escape without any losses.

On 21 August 2010, the Russian FSB officers launched a raid on a safehouse of the Derbent Jamaat in Gunib. The Russian side initially offered the militants to surrender, but this was followed by a firefight, and all five militants, as well as their leader, Magomed Vagabov, were killed. On 18 April 2011, the Russian security forces located and killed Israpil Velijanov near Tashkapur in Levashinsky District of Dagestan. In 2016, the Russian security forces carried out a number of large-scale operations against the Dagestan Jamaat. On 17 July, 10 Derbent Jamaat militants, as well as their leader Hasan Abdullaev were killed Suleyman-Stalsky District, and another high-ranking commander, emir Kamaldin Kazimagomedov was killed on July 29. Russian security forces launched further operations to eliminate the group and its last member was killed in early November. According to then the head of Dagestan, Ramazan Abdulatipov, "all sabotage and terrorist groups operating in Dagestan" were destroyed.
