= Ramil Usubov =

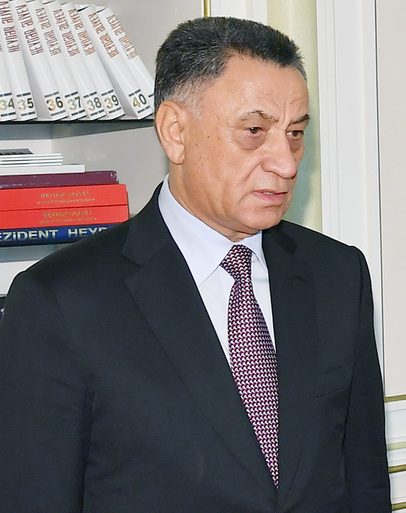
- Usubov in 2018

Secretary of Security Council of Azerbaijan
- Incumbent
- Assumed office June 20, 2019
- President: Ilham Aliyev

7th Minister of Internal Affairs
- In office April 29, 1994 – June 20, 2019
- President: Heydar Aliyev; Ilham Aliyev
- Preceded by: Vagif Novruzov
- Succeeded by: Vilayət Eyvazov

Minister of Internal Affairs of Nakhichevan Autonomous Republic
- In office August 11, 1993 – April 29, 1994
- President: Heydar Aliyev
- Preceded by: Himself under the Nakhichevan ASSR
- Succeeded by: Akhmed Akhmedov

Personal details
- Born: December 22, 1948 (age 77) Khojali Rayon, Azerbaijan SSR, USSR
- Party: CPSU (until 1991); New Azerbaijan Party

Military service
- Branch/service: Internal Troops of Azerbaijan
- Rank: Colonel General

Ramil Idris oglu Usubov (Azerbaijani: Ramil İdris oğlu Usubov, born 1948) is the incumbent Secretary of the Security Council of Azerbaijan. He previously served as the Minister of Internal Affairs of Azerbaijan from 1994 to 2019.

== Early life ==
Usubov was born in 1948 in Khojali Rayon of Azerbaijan. In 1970, he completed special school of Militsia named after N. Rzayev in Baku and graduated from Academy of Internal Affairs of USSR in 1980. Then he served in the Soviet Army and starting from 1970 worked in law enforcement. Usubov is married and has three children.

== Career ==
He worked in criminal investigation units and in 1975 was appointed the head of Criminal Investigation Department of Shusha Rayon of Azerbaijan. In 1980–1984, he served as the deputy chief of Internal Affairs Department of Nagorno Karabakh Autonomous Oblast of Azerbaijan. In 1984–1987, he was the chief of Ali Bayramli department of Internal Affairs. In 1987, Usubov was appointed Minister of Internal Affairs of Nakhichevan and from 1989 up until 1993, worked as the Chief of Criminal Investigation, Head of Department of Visas and Registration (OVIR) and Chief of Human Resources of Ministry of Internal Affairs of Azerbaijan.

=== Minister of Internal Affairs ===
On August 11, 1993, he was appointed as the Minister of Internal Affairs of Nakhichevan Autonomous Republic, and on April 29, 1994, he was appointed as Minister of Internal Affairs of Azerbaijan by Presidential decree No. 140. During a Victory Day event in Baku in 2000, President Heydar Aliyev dismissed rumors about Usubov's potential dismissal, saying that "General Ramil Usubov is a very valuable man and works well" while praising his work.

In 2009, he filed a libel suit against activist Leyla Yunus after she alleged that police officers had been involved in human trafficking of young girls. He demanded 100,000 manat in damages. Human Rights Watch protested the trial, stating that "a judgment against Yunus would set a terrible precedent for freedom of expression in Azerbaijan", while other international groups described the case as "one more example of the Azerbaijani government cracking down on free expression".

=== Secretary of the Security Council ===
By order of President Ilham Aliyev, on June 20, 2019, Usubov was appointed Secretary of the Security Council.

== Dates of ranks ==
Promotions
Insignia	Rank	Date
	Major General	May 3, 1994
	Lieutenant General	December 26, 1995
	Colonel General.	January 15, 2002

== Awards ==
- Azerbaijani Flag Order (December 24, 1998)
- Order of Merit of the Republic of Poland (1999)
- Sharaf Order (December 25, 2023)

== See also ==
- Ministers of Internal Affairs of Azerbaijan Republic
- Internal Troops of Azerbaijan
