= Security Council of Azerbaijan =

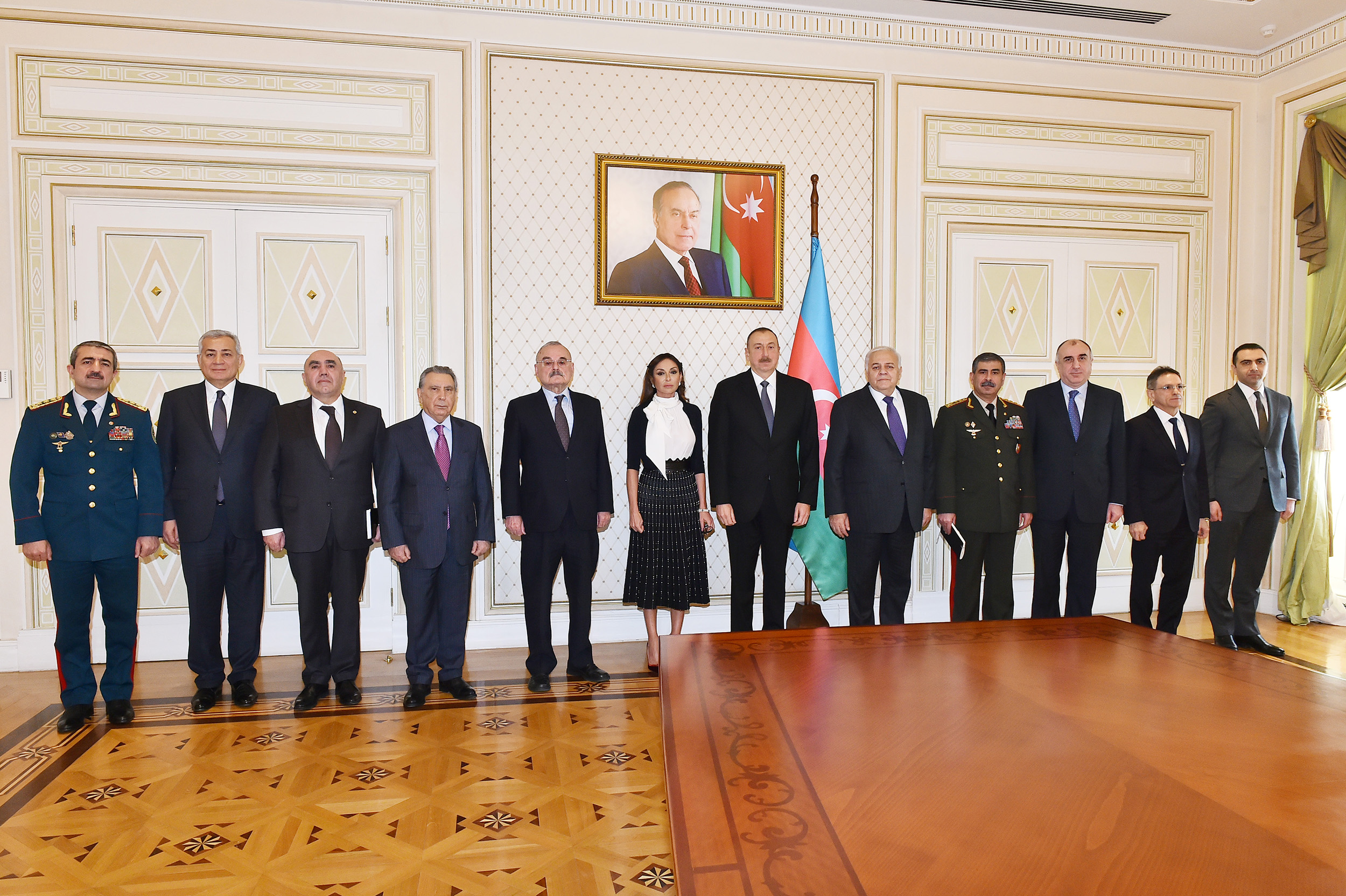
A meeting of the security council.

The Security Council of Azerbaijan (Azerbaijani: Azərbaycan Respublikasının Təhlükəsizlik Şurası) is an advisory body to the President of Azerbaijan. It ensures the creation of conditions for the President to exercise his constitutional powers in the field of security. It is governed by Article 109, Paragraph 27 of the Constitution of Azerbaijan. The chairman of the Security Council under the president of Azerbaijan is the president of Azerbaijan.

== History ==
It was established on May 14, 1991, by order of the first Azerbaijani President, Ayaz Mutallibov, under the name of the National Security Council under the President of the Republic of Azerbaijan. It was reestablished as the Security Council on 10 April 1997. On 11 September 2019, new regulations on the Service of the Secretary of the Security Council were approved by Decree No. 829 of the President.

== Organization ==
- Service of the Secretary
  - Department of Implementation Control and Personnel Issues
  - General Security Issues Department
  - Military Security Issues Department

== Membership ==
Image	Holder	Position
	Ilham Aliyev	President of Azerbaijan
	Mehriban Aliyeva	Vice President of Azerbaijan
	Ramil Usubov	Secretary of Security Council
	Madat Guliyev	Deputy Secretary of the Security Council
	Ali Asadov	Prime Minister of Azerbaijan
	Sahiba Gafarova	Chairman of the National Assembly
	Samir Nuriyev	Head of the Presidential Administration
	Fuad Alasgarov	Assistant to the President (Law Enforcement and Military Affairs)
	Kamran Aliyev	Prosecutor General
	Vilayat Eyvazov	Minister of Internal Affairs
	Zakir Hasanov	Minister of Defense
	Jeyhun Bayramov	Minister of Foreign Affairs
	Elchin Guliyev	Head of the State Border Service
	Ali Nağıyev	Head of the State Security Service
	Orkhan Sultanov	Head of the Foreign Intelligence Service

== Secretaries ==
Image	Name	Affiliation	Term Start	Term End	President
	Ramil Usubov	Ministry of Internal Affairs	June 20, 2019	Present	Ilham Aliyev
