= Omar Sheikhulayev =

Russian Islamist rebel (1975–2009)

Emir of the Dagestani Front
- In office 5 December 2008 – 5 February 2009
- Preceded by: Abdul Madzhid
- Succeeded by: Umalat Magomedov

Personal details
- Born: 5 June 1975 Untsukul Dagestan RSFSR USSR
- Died: 5 February 2009 (aged 33) outside Makhachkala Dagestan Russia
- Nickname: Emir Muaz

Military service
- Allegiance: Caucasus Emirate
- Commands: Vilayat Dagestan
- Battles/wars: Insurgency in the North Caucasus

Omar (Umar) Sheikhulayev (Russian: Умар Магомедович Шейхулаев, 5 June 1975 - 5 February 2009), also known as Emir Muaz, was the militant leader of the Vilayat Dagestan of the Caucasus Emirate, in the volatile southern Russian republic of Dagestan.

== Biography ==
Omar was a close associate of Rappani Khalilov and Rasul Makasharipov. In December 2008 Dokku Umarov appointed him leader of the Shariat Jamaat as a successor to the slain Ilgas Malachiyev. He was accused of killing Deputy Chief of Staff of the North Regional Command of Internal Troops of the Russian Federation, Major General Lipinsky.

He was killed on 5 February 2009 in a fierce shoot-out with the Russian security forces outside of Makhachkala.
