= Daudov =

Daudov (masculine, Russian: Даудов) or Daudova (feminine, Russian: Даудова) is a Russian surname. Notable people with the surname include:

- Ibragimkhalil Daudov (1960–2012), Dagestani militant
- Magomed Daudov (born 1980), Russian statesman, politician, and military commander
- Marat Daudov (born 1989), Ukrainian football player
