= Veteran of Police Medal (Azerbaijan) =

- Type: Medal
- Date: April 20, 2006
- Country: Azerbaijan
- Reward(s): Ministry of Internal Affairs (Azerbaijan)
- Status: Active

The Veteran of Police Medal is a state award (medal) of Azerbaijan. It was established in April 20, 2006.

== Description ==
The "Police Veteran" medal is made of bronze. It has an outer diameter of 32 mm, and the shape of an eight-pointed star with silver embossing. Inside the middle circle, the emblem of the internal affairs bodies is depicted. The inscription "Veteran police" is written along the upper arc, with a wreath of oak leaves carved along the lower semicircle. Convex rays starting from the center are depicted inside the circle above the horizontal diameter.

The reverse side of the medal has a smooth surface, and the words "Azerbaijan" are engraved along the upper arc, "Republic" along the lower arc, and the outline of the Republic of Azerbaijan is engraved in the center.

The medal is attached to a silver metal plate measuring 20 mm x 42 mm, with a ring and an element that allows it to be attached to clothing via the ring. The front panel consists of two parts. The upper part is covered with a black stripe divided into blue, red and green vertical stripes of equal width corresponding to the colors of the flag of the Republic of Azerbaijan.

In the center of the lower part of the plate, a crescent and an eight-pointed star are depicted, from which the rays flow from the center to the edges. The length of the upper part of the board is 32 mm at the edges and 34 mm in the middle, and the length of the lower part is 10 mm at the edges and 8 mm in the middle.

The medal is fitted with a 20mm x 10mm die containing an element for attachment to clothing, made of metal and covered with the same black ribbon.
