= Islamic State insurgency in Azerbaijan =

Ongoing insurgency

- Part of aftermath of the insurgency in the North Caucasus
- Map of Azerbaijan
Date	1 August 2024 – Present
Location	Azerbaijan (Mostly Qusar District)
Status	Ongoing

Belligerents
Azerbaijan; Russia (only February 2025)	Islamic State Derbent Jamaat remnants

Commanders and leaders
(Azerbaijan) Unknown	(Islamic State) Unknown

Units involved
Azerbaijani Government; State Security Service; Ministry of Emergency Situations; Law enforcement in Azerbaijan	Islamic State; Azerbaijan Province; Khorasan Province; Derbent Jamaat remnants

Casualties and losses
Per the Islamic State: (Azerbaijan) 7 killed; (Azerbaijan) 1 wounded	(Islamic State) 10 killed

The Islamic State insurgency in Azerbaijan is an ongoing low-level insurgency in Azerbaijan, mainly the Qusar District. The conflict is between the Azerbaijani Government and Islamists that pledged allegiance to the Islamic State.

== Background ==
On 2 July 2019, a video was published from Azerbaijan featuring three fighters armed with Kalashnikov style rifles pledging their allegiance to Abu Bakr al-Baghdadi. The video was released by IS, without explicitly referring it to Azerbaijan as one of its Provinces.

On 27 October 2019, Abu Ibrahim al-Hashimi al-Qurashi received pledges of allegiance from various provinces and regions in Azerbaijan, with photos of fighters from Azerbaijan pledging allegiance to him.

== Timeline ==
=== 2024 ===
In August 2024, Azerbaijan released a video showing military vehicles confronting militants, who were believed to be remnants of the “Forest Brothers”/"Derbent Jamaat", a defunct jihadist group in Azerbaijan.

On 5 September 2024, a former employee of the Ministry of Emergency Situations, Akhmedov Ramik Radikoglu, was killed in a shootout after he reportedly discovered an Islamic State weapons cache.

On 19 September 2024, the al-Naba newsletter reported on a clash that it said had been carried out by a two-person militant cell in the forests near Qusar, Azerbaijan. According to the publication, the incident began when the militants shot and killed a police officer who had approached their position. Azerbaijani security forces later arrived with reinforcements and surrounded the area, leading to an exchange of fire. The report claimed that seven soldiers, including an officer, were killed or wounded in the fighting.

=== 2025 ===
In February 2025, Azerbaijan and Russia announced a week-long border operation called “Border Shield,” intended to secure Azerbaijan’s northern regions and dismantle terrorist groups.

In May 2025, Azerbaijan extradited four people who had allegedly visited Islamic State – Khorasan Province (ISKP) training camps near the Pakistan-Afghanistan border, two others for arrested for funding ISKP. In October 2025, an Azerbaijani court sentenced an ISKP member to thirteen years in prison for planning an arson attack on a synagogue in Baku, Azerbaijan.

=== 2026 ===
On 27 January 2026, Azerbaijan's State Security Service announced that it had arrested three militants affiliated with ISKP who were allegedly planning an attack on the Israeli embassy in Baku.
