= 2008 Abu Bakr Mosque Bombing (Baku) =

Terrorist incident in Azerbaijan

Coordinates: 40.385806°N 49.850500°E

- Location: Baku, Azerbaijan
- Date: August 17, 2008
- Target: Abu Bakr Mosque
- Attack type: Terrorist bombing
- Weapon: Grenade
- Deaths: 3
- Injuries: 11
- Perpetrator: Derbent Jamaat
- Motive: Jihadism

The 2008 Abu Bakr Mosque Bombing took place on August 17, 2008, when a grenade was thrown through a window of the Abu Bakr mosque (Əbübəkr Məscidi) in central Baku, Azerbaijan, during the evening prayer. Three people were killed and eleven more were injured. The Azerbaijani security forces accused the Russia-based Jihadist group, Derbent Jamaat, for the attack and launched the Operation Eagle.

== Background ==
According to the annual Country Report on Terrorism in 2008 of the US Department of State, "Azerbaijan is a logical route for extremists with ties to terrorist organizations".

According to Reuters, the mosque is used both by Sunni and Wahhabi Muslims. And while Azerbaijan has launched several investigations into Wahhabism in the last few months, law enforcement agencies determined that Wahhabists convicted of an attempted terrorist act in the town of Sumgait had links to al-Qaeda. Whilst the activities of Wahabbists in Azerbaijan are considered controversial, the government has declared Wahabbi groups would not be banned.

The U.S. and Israeli embassies in Azerbaijan expressed concern about the incident.

== Investigation ==
A special committee was created to handle the investigation. The mosque remained closed during the investigation.

The Ministry of National Security of Azerbaijan accused the Russia-based Derbent Jamaat leaders Ilgar Mollachiyev from Zagatala, and Samir Mehdiyev (Suleiman) and a group of others of organizing the attack on Abu Bakr Mosque in Baku. In 2007, 17 members of the group were arrested in Sumgayit. As the Ministry reported, "According to their plan, a Sumgayit Jamaat (a secret extremist group) had to be created. They planned a number of robberies in Baku in order to collect funds for a holy war (Jihad)." The attack was followed by the Operation Eagle, launched by the Azerbaijani security services.
