= Internal Troops of Azerbaijan =

Internal Troops of Azerbaijan Azərbaycan Respublikası Daxili Qoşunları
- Emblem of the Internal Troops of Azerbaijan

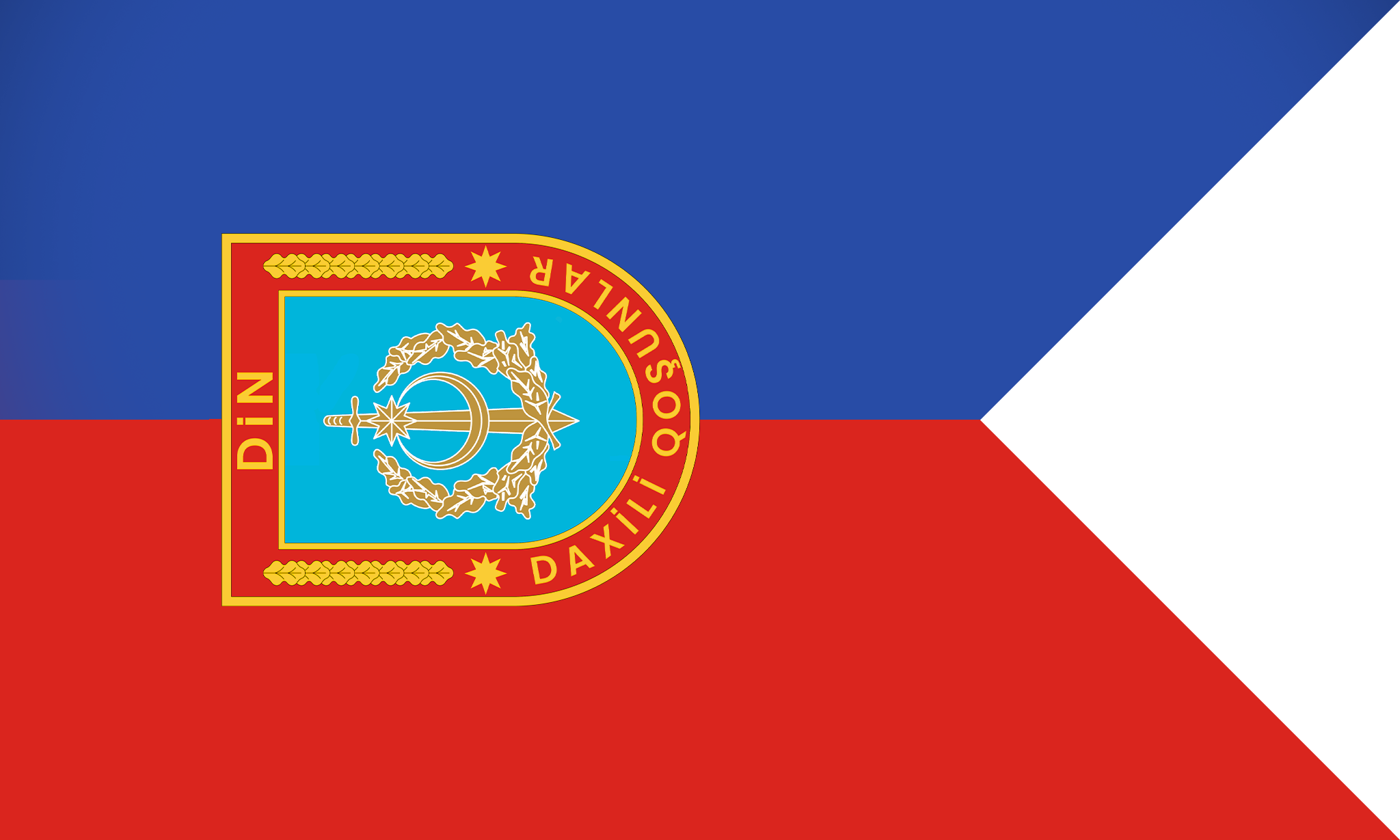
- Flag of the Internal Troops of Azerbaijan
- Motto: Daxili Qoşunlarda xidmətinlə fəxr et! Be proud of your service in the Internal Troops!

Agency overview
- Formed: March 12, 1992

Jurisdictional structure
- Operations jurisdiction: Azerbaijan
- General nature: Gendarmerie

Operational structure
- Headquarters: Baku
- Agency executive: Lieutenant General Shahin Mammadov, Commander of Internal Troops
- Parent agency: Ministry of Internal Affairs

Website
- dq.mia.gov.az
- Engagements: First Nagorno-Karabakh War; 2003 Azerbaijani protests; Operation Eagle; 2012 Guba Riots; 2020 Nagorno-Karabakh war
- The Internal Troops anthem is called Soldier of the Internal Troops.

The Internal Troops of Azerbaijan (Azerbaijani: Azərbaycan Respublikası Daxili Qoşunları), also known as Interior Troops or Interior Guard, is the uniformed gendarmerie-like force in Azerbaijan. Internal Troops are subordinated to the Ministry of Internal Affairs of Azerbaijan (the police authority of the country). The Internal Troops are the descendant of the Soviet Union's Internal Troops, and are used to deal with internal emergencies such as natural disasters, restoring public order, internal armed conflicts and to safeguard important facilities. During wartime, the Internal Troops fall under the jurisdiction of the Azerbaijani Land Forces and fulfill tasks of local defense and security. Other law enforcement bodies in Azerbaijan include the Azerbaijani National Guard and the State Border Service and its Coast Guard subcomponent. Founded in 1933, the Mubariz Keshikde newspaper informs the public about the activities of the internal troops.

== History ==
In 1991, Azerbaijani Internal Troops was founded based on the decree of the president and later in 1994 activity areas of Internal Troops were determined by the law of the country on the Status of Internal Troops. 12 March is defined as a "Day of Internal Troops" by presidential decree dated 9 March 1995.

== Roles ==
According to law, the Internal Troops perform the following tasks:

- Together with other internal affairs bodies in cities and other settlements act to protect the public, ensuring public safety during mass events including:
  - Important state and public events, and transportation of important persons;
  - Take part in the search and apprehension of intruders into protected areas;
- To supply the Department of the Ministry of Internal Affairs with personnel to provide protection for storehouses and military bases;
- To supply the Department of the Ministry of Internal Affairs with personnel to provide help in natural disasters and other similar situations;
- Aid in preventing mass riots in residential areas;
- To provide help to prevent mass riots in prisons;
- To search and apprehend fugitive convicts and arrested persons;
- If necessary, take part in the defense of the area.

Its equipment includes Heckler & Koch MP5 submachine guns.

== Structure ==
=== Main Department of Internal Troops ===
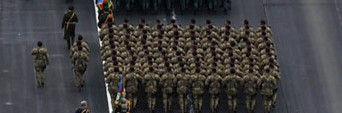
The Internal Troops at the Baku Victory Parade of 2020.

This department is considered as a main structural unit in order to preserve governmental and civil interests of the country. In accordance with the article 11 of the law on the Issues of Internal Troops, the main department of the Internal Troops is led by the commander of internal troops. Internal Troops of Azerbaijan cooperates with the same bodies of several countries such as China, and Turkey.

The period for the military service is eighteen months but for undergraduates, this period is defined as a year.

==== Military Council ====
Military Council acts within the Main Department of Internal Troops on the basis of statue accepted by the president. The council consists of the commander of internal troops, chief of headquarter and deputy directors of commander. However, other officials of the main department include the military council.

==== Hospital ====
The Military Hospital of the Internal Troops was established in 1993. The hospital has 12 departments: On 15 December 2005, the hospital has changed its location. All servicemen who apply to the Military Hospital of the Internal Troops, as well as their family members, undergo an initial clinical examination, and emergency medical care can be provided.

==== Band ====
The Band of the Internal Troops of Azerbaijan is the official military band of the Internal Troops. Currently, the band has 115 members and includes song and dance ensemble. On 17 November 1994, the Main Department ordered the establishment of the band. The current artistic director is Lieutenant Colonel Ilgar Novruzov, a graduate of the Baku Academy of Music. He is also the author and composer of the anthem of the Internal Troops.

=== Combined Arms Brigade of the Internal Troops ===
On 10 April 1995, the Nakhchivan "N" Battalion of the Internal Troops was established, being upgraded to a regiment in 2002. In 2014, the Nakhchivan Special Operations Brigade of the Internal Troops was established. It currently forms part of the Nakhchivan Garrison.

== Commander of the Internal Troops ==
The Commander of Internal Troops is a deputy director of the Ministry of Internal Affairs and the chairman of the staff of internal troops. The main responsibilities of the commander are leading the internal troops, providing the preparation of mobilization and effective implementation of officers’ duties. Furthermore, according to the article 10, the commander is considered as a decision maker relating to the issues of internal troops.

=== List of commanders ===
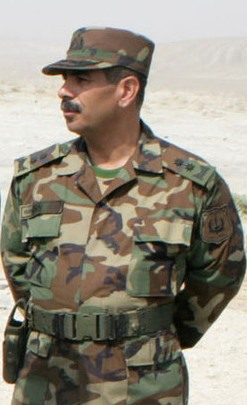
No.	Name	Picture	Term start	Term end
1	Lieutenant General Zakir Hasanov		2003	2013
2	Lieutenant General Shahin Mammedov		2013	Present

== Educational institutions ==
=== Higher Military School of the Internal Troops ===
Higher Military School of the Internal Troops of Azerbaijan was created in accordance with the presidential decree dated 25 February 2011 on the base of the Vocational Military School of the Internal Troops. Regulation of the military school was confirmed by the presidential decree in 2012. The Higher Military School of the Internal Troops is situated in Baku and led by Ilqar Mammadov.

Military School is responsible for preparing special-military educated personnel, improving specialties of military officers and implementing scientific-investigation issues. Educational duration is four years and trainings and subjects are defined relating to the European Credit Transfer System (ECTS) that guarantees academic recognition of studies abroad. The High Military School gives two specialties to the graduates such as, military and civil specialty. "High Special-Military Educated Military Officer" is a military specialty and "Physical Education and Initial Preparation Teacher" is a civil specialty. At the same time graduates gain both bachelor's degree and lieutenant military rank.

=== Gala Training Regiment ===
The training regiment acts on the basis of the training center of internal troops since 2003. NATO standards are applied to the educational system. Three types of training courses are arranged at the regiment such as, half-yearly preparation courses, quarterly improvement courses for officer and Warrant officers and a month academy courses. More than 930 military officers and warrant officers have passed military courses at the Gala Training Regiment respectively, 527 and 406 Servicemen.

== See also ==
- OPON
