= Umalat Magomedov =

Russian rebel (1979–2009)

Emir of the Dagestani Front
- In office 12 April 2009 – 31 December 2009
- Preceded by: Omar Sheikhulayev
- Succeeded by: Magomed Vagabov

Personal details
- Born: 1979 Khasavyurt, Dagestan ASSR, RSFSR, USSR
- Died: 31 December 2009 (aged 30) Khasavyurt, Dagestan, Russia
- Nickname: Emir Al Bara

Military service
- Allegiance: Caucasus Emirate
- Commands: Vilayat Dagestan
- Battles/wars: Insurgency in the North Caucasus

Umalat Magomedov, also known as Emir Al Bara, was the leader of the militant Vilayat Dagestan organisation in the southern Russian Republic of Dagestan.

== Biography ==
He was appointed emir by Dokka Umarov, leader of the Caucasus Emirate, in April 2009 after the death of Omar Sheikhulayev. He was killed by Russian security forces on 31 December 2009.

The widow of Umalat Magomedov, a 17-year-old called Dzhanet Abdullayeva (also known as Abdurakhmanova) was one of the two suicide bombers who carried out the 2010 Moscow Metro bombings.
