= January 2005 Dagestan Raids =

Battle of the Second Chechen War

January 15, 2005 sieges in Daghestan
- Part of Second Chechen War
Date	January 15, 2005
Location	Makhachkala and Kaspiysk, Daghestan
Result	Russian tactical victory

Belligerents
Russia: Dagestan	Shariat Jamaat

Commanders and leaders
(Russia) Arzulum Ilyasov †	Magomedzagir Akayev †

Strength
?	8

Casualties and losses
4 killed 1 wounded	6 killed 1 wounded and captured

January 15, 2005 sieges were two raids of the Russian security forces on a militant Islamist group's safehouses in Daghestan. At least four Russian commandos and six rebels died in the clashes, while one was captured. The group, called Shariat Jamaat, previously killed 29 members of the Daghestani department for fighting extremism and criminal terrorism, including its chief Akhberdilav Akilov.

== Sieges ==
=== Siege of Makhachkala ===
In the first incident, the government forces surrounded a group of five rebel fighters in a two-story house on the outskirts of Makhachkala, capital of Dagestan. For 17 hours, the rebels battled Russian special forces supported by armoured vehicles and a helicopter, killing one of elite Alpha Group commandos and wounding another. In the end a tank belonging to the Russian Marines smashed the remains of the burned and gutted house. The authorities claimed that among the five bodies recovered from the ruins was the Jennet leader Rasul Makasharipov, but it turned out to be incorrect when Makasharipov resurfaced four days later.

5 Islamists were killed.

=== Ambush of Kaspiysk ===
In a separate clash this day, special police task force stormed another house in Dagestan's port of Kaspiysk to arrest a separate group of militants. Three SOBR officers were killed in the attempt, including group commander Colonel Arzulum Ilyasov. One rebel was killed (50-year-old commander Magomedzagir Akayev) and one wounded and captured, while the third one escaped (according to some reports two were captured). 17-29 Islamists were killed, 9-21 captured, none wounded.
