= Ibragimkhalil Daudov =

Islamic militant leader (1960–2012)

Emir of the Dagestani Front
- In office 9 May 2011 – 14 February 2012
- Preceded by: Israpil Velijanov
- Succeeded by: Rustam Asildarov

Personal details
- Born: 11 November 1960 Dagestan, RSFSR, USSR
- Died: 14 February 2012 (aged 51) Dagestan, Russia
- Nickname: Emir Salikh

Military service
- Allegiance: Caucasus Emirate
- Commands: Vilayat Dagestan
- Battles/wars: Insurgency in the North Caucasus

Ibragimkhalil Daudov (11 November 1960 – 14 February 2012), also known as Emir Salikh, was the leader of the militant Vilayat Dagestan in Dagestan after the death of Israpil Velijanov.

== Biography ==
Ibragimkhalil reportedly joined Vilayat Dagestan in 2008. After serving time in Azerbaijan for possession of weapons, Daudov returned to his native village of Gubden, where he was placed under police surveillance. After his house caught fire, the villagers found a hidden weapons cache on the premises. Ibragimkhalil took with him his three sons and joined the militant group led by Magomed Vagabov. He eventually went on to become the leader of the group from 9 May 2011 until his death.

Russian investigators say Daudov brought his wife and another woman to Moscow in 2009 to carry out a suicide attack on people celebrating New Year's Eve near the Kremlin, but their bomb exploded hours earlier in a Moscow suburb. Daudov's wife was killed in the explosion and several people were arrested.

On 10 February 2012, Russian security forces attacked a house that contained a number of militants including Ibragimkhalil. On 14 February 2012, Ibragimkhalil Daudov was found dead in a river near the village of Gurbuki. He had apparently escaped from the scene of the earlier operation but died of his wounds and exposure. All three of his sons were killed fighting the security forces; Mohammed Daudov in the summer of 2009, Magomedshapi Daudov in April 2010 and Magamedhabib Daudov in February 2012 in the same operation that resulted in the death of their father.
