= Law enforcement in Azerbaijan =

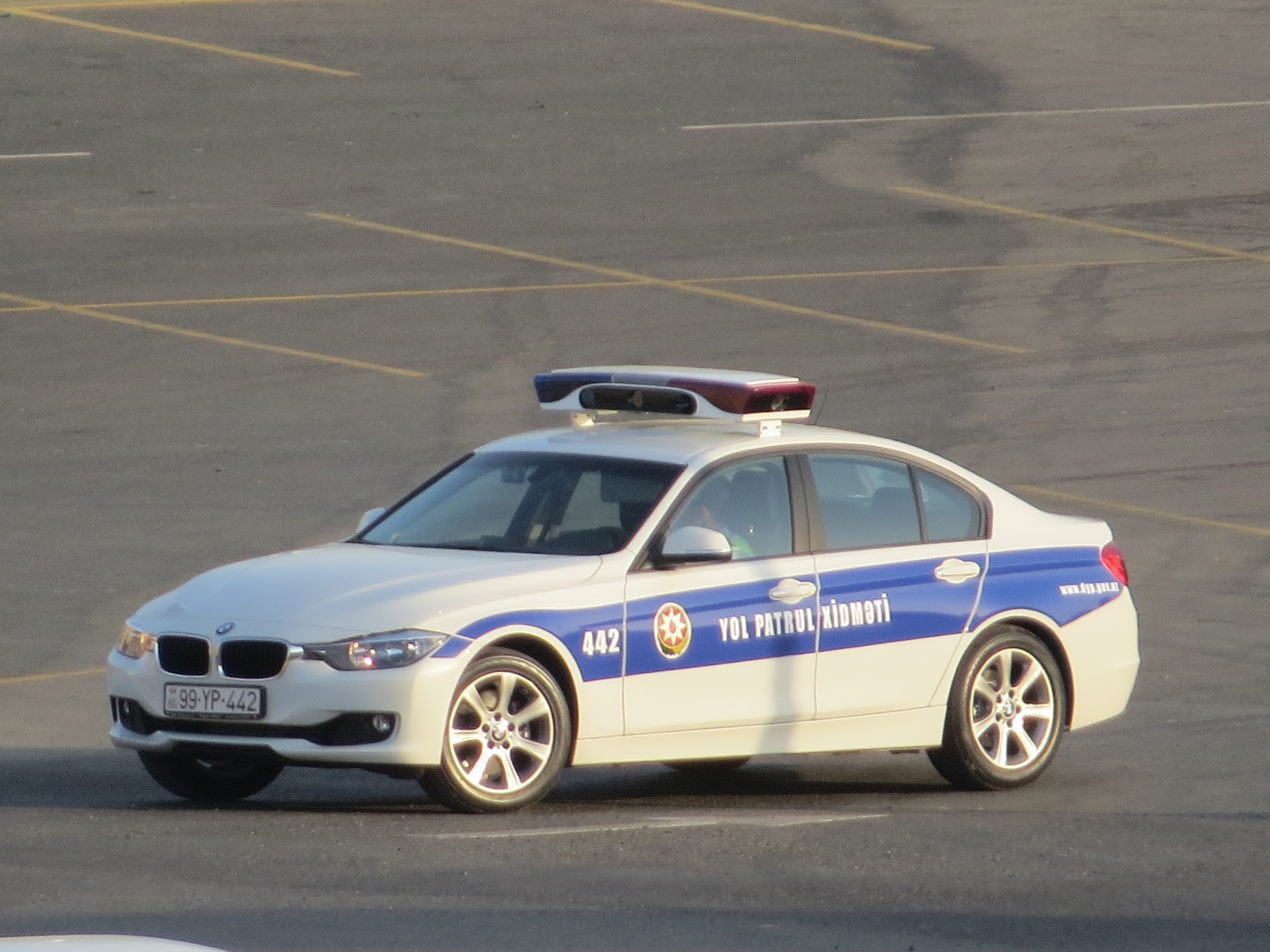
Traffic police car in Baku

Law enforcement in Azerbaijan comes under the control of the Ministry of Internal Affairs, which administers the National Police of the Republic of Azerbaijan. Admitted to the Organization for Security and Co-operation in Europe (OSCE) on 30 January 1992, with an OSCE office opening in Baku on 16 November 1999. It is a member of Interpol.

== Law enforcement agencies ==
The Prosecutor's Office and the Ministry of Internal Affairs of the Republic of Azerbaijan are the main law enforcement agencies, which have a broad range of responsibilities. Other law enforcement agencies in Azerbaijan are Customs Committee, Ministry of Taxes, Ministry of Justice, Ministry of Emergency Situations, and State Border Service. Internal investigation offices of these agencies are responsible for dealing with crimes in specific areas.

=== The Prosecutor’s Office ===
The Prosecutor's office is a part of judicial system in Azerbaijan. In 1999, with the Law “On Prosecutor’s Office” the responsibilities of the office included:

- investigating criminal acts;
- participating in the procedures conducted by the courts;
- protecting public accusations in the criminal procedures;
- supervising the implementation and operation of laws;

The Law recognizes the Prosecutor's Office as a single and centralized body. The Prosecutor's Office reports to Prosecutor General.

=== The Ministry of Internal Affairs ===
The Ministry of Internal Affairs of the Republic of Azerbaijan is the central executive body for law enforcement. The responsibilities of the ministry include filing criminal investigation, protection of public order and security, and prevention of criminal offences. The institutional structure and the regulations of the Ministry was approved on June 30, 2001, by the Presidential decree. On November 24, 1992, the Republic of Azerbaijan agreed with the Interpol, and the National Central Bureau (NBC) for Azerbaijan was established within the Ministry of Internal Affairs in 1993. The Department of Internal Security was established on June 30, 2004, by the decree of the President of Azerbaijan. The department deals with the activities that are incompatible with police service, exposure of facts about corruption and corrupt officers, and conduction corporate control with the Ministry.

==== Main Organized Crime Department ====
Following the decree of the President of the Republic of Azerbaijan “On Intensified Combat against Crime and Reinforcement of Law and Order”, which was adopted on August 9, 1994, Organized Crime Department was established within the Ministry. On June 30, 2004, the level of Organized Crime Department was upgraded and became the main department by the Decree No. 83 “On Institutional Amendments at the Ministry of Internal Affairs”.

In 2004, the Department on Combating Traffic in Human Beings was established with the Main Organized Crime Department.

Responsibilities of the Department include:

- fight against robbery, extortion, kidnapping, hostage-taking;
- fight against human trafficking;
- collecting and storing the information regarding organized crime, studying the performance of local police services, data analysis;
- exposing, detecting, and neutralizing organized criminal groups;
- information collecting about criminal groups engaged in transnational crimes;
- studying the preconditions regarding the foundation of organized criminal groups and giving draft proposals to the Ministry of Internal Affairs

== INTERPOL Baku ==
The Interpol National Central Bureau (NBC) in the Republic of Azerbaijan was established in 1993. The purpose of NBC Baku is to maintain the quick and coherent exchange of criminal intelligence between law enforcement agencies in Azerbaijan and their counterparts in other Interpol member countries and work with them to localize fugitives and missing persons and identify criminals by using INTERPOL criminal databases.

The departments in INTERPOL Baku are followings:

- Analysis;
- Supplies;
- Technical Support;
- General Crime;
- Registry.

The number of staff in INTERPOL Baku is 44 persons and 30 of them are national police officers. The Ministry of Internal Affairs appoints the head of National Central Bureau in Azerbaijan.

== Organisation ==
The National Police force is under the authority of the Ministry of Internal Affairs, and regulated by the Internal Investigation Department. The latter supervises the police's compliance with the law, human rights, and civil liberties, and checks for violations of such and any other illegal activities. Directly subordinate to the Ministers, the IID watches over the activities of the police, with several divisions dedicated to complaints and organization difficulties, always as malfeasance matters.

The police force itself also consists of a large number of divisions and departments, ranging from both specialized and regular police divisions, education, training, medical, a National Central Bureau of Interpol, criminal intelligence, administration, investigation and inquest departments, drug abuse control departments, operations and statistics, transportation, traffic police, human resources, communication and planning departments and press services, financial, logistics and civil defense.

=== Nakhchivan Autonomous Republic ===
The National Police of the Republic of Azerbaijan are also responsible for enforcing the law in the Nakhchivan Autonomous Republic via a specialised department of Azerbaijan's Ministry of the Interior and the Nakhchivan City Police Department.

=== Ranks ===
Officers

Rank group	General / flag officers			Senior officers			Junior officers
Police of Azerbaijan
Police of Azerbaijan	Police colonel general Polis general-polkovniki	Police lieutenant general Polis general-leytenantı	Police major general Polis general-mayoru	Police colonel Polis polkovniki	Police lieutenant colonel Polis polkovnik-leytenantı	Police major Polis mayoru	Police captain Polis kapitanı	Police senior lieutenant Polis baş leytenantı	Police lieutenant Polis leytenantı	Police sub-lieutenant Polis kiçik leytenantı	Police cadet Polis kursantı

Enlisted

Rank group	Senior NCOs		Junior NCOs	Enlisted
Police of Azerbaijan
Police of Azerbaijan	Police senior sergeant Polis baş serjantı	Police sergeant Polis serjantı	Police junior sergeant Polis kiçik serjantı	Police private Polis sıravi

== Training ==
The Azerbaijan National Police Academy was founded in 1921 in Baku as a training establishment for police officers and commanders and remained there until 1936 when it was relocated to the village of Mardakan. With the country under the sphere of Soviet influence, 1957 saw the police school was renamed the USSR Ministry of Internal Affairs Baku Special Police School, which awarded students law degrees after a two-year course. From 1957 until 1961, the school also trained personnel from Georgia, Daghestan, Kabardino-Balkaria, Altay, Irkutsk, Krasnodar, Kuibyshev, Novosibirsk, Kemerovo and Saratov. Following support from Heydar Aliyev, then leader of Azerbaijan, the police school became an Academy on May 23, 1992, and now resides in Baku, providing training for personnel of the Ministry of Internal Affairs and the National Police Force, as well as offering training programs for foreign organizations on request.

Applicants for full or part-time education in the academy are given several criteria by the police force which must be met before they can be successful. These criteria include physical characteristics (height and fitness) and academic (secondary school graduates, knowledge of literature, history, geography, and languages). Successful students who graduate from the five-year course are awarded qualifications in law and a promotion to lieutenant in the police force.

== Crime rates ==
Azerbaijan's Ministry of Internal Affairs' three-month analysis in 2006 illustrated that Azerbaijan suffers from extensive narcotics-related crime (one crime from every five criminal events is related to narcotics). The MIA's figures state that this drug trafficking across Azerbaijan's borders is a significant problem, and led to the creation of the National Program for Combating Drug Abuse, Illegal Traffic in Narcotic Drugs, Psychotropic Substances and Precursors. Azerbaijan is a party to a number of United Nations anti-drug-trafficking conventions from the years of 1961, 1971 and 1988, however the MIA states that it fails to intercept 90% of drugs that cross the border, and recorded 10965 drug-related cases from 2000 to 2004, seizing 747 kg of narcotics, as well as 10,000 tablets and more than 3,000 ampoules of psychotropic substances. 1221 cultivations of illicit substances, and 2000 tons of cannabis were also destroyed in the same period.

Despite the growing drugs problem, from 1993 to 2004 Azerbaijan enjoyed an overall drop from 246 to 185 crimes per 100,000 of the population which is a drop of 18145 to 16810 recorded crimes, and a rise from 79.5% to 94.2% in the number of cases solved. Murders in Azerbaijan decreased from 478 to 201 per 100,000 and thefts from 4943 to 1775 per 100,000. The theft of motor vehicles and firearms crimes also dropped similarly, however, robbery increased from 216 to 672 per 100,000 through the period. Azerbaijan experienced a major shooting spree on April 30, 2009, when either one or two gunmen entered the Azerbaijan State Oil Academy, killing 13 and injuring another 13.

== See also ==
- Police Academy (Azerbaijan)
- Ministry of Internal Affairs (Azerbaijan)
- Prosecutor General's Office of Azerbaijan
- Interpol
