= Special Purpose Police Unit =

Defunct Azerbaijani special police force

- Xüsusi Təyinatlı Polis Dəstəsi (Azerbaijani); Отряд милиции особого назначения (Russian)
- Active: 1990 – March 17, 1995
- Country: Azerbaijan
- Agency: Ministry of Internal Affairs
- Type: Police tactical unit
- Operations jurisdiction: National
- Headquarters: Baku
- Common name: OPON

Commanders
- Current commander: General Rovshan Javadov
- Notable commanders: Commander of Aghdam detachment Allahverdi Baghirov

Notables
- Significant operation(s): First Nagorno-Karabakh War; Operation Ring

The Special Purpose Police Unit (Azerbaijani: Xüsusi Təyinatlı Polis Dəstəsi (XTPD); Russian: Отряд милиции особого назначения, OMON) or OPON (Otrjad Policiji Osobovo Naznačenija) was a police tactical detachment unit within the Ministry of Internal Affairs of Azerbaijan Republic in the early 1990s formed during the First Nagorno-Karabakh War. The first body of the unit consisted of 3,000 policemen.

The unit's missions primarily involve anti-irregular military, apprehension of armed and dangerous criminals, counterterrorism and hostage rescue crisis management, executive protection, high-risk tactical law enforcement situations, operating in difficult to access terrain, protecting high-level meeting areas, providing security in areas at risk of attack or terrorism, quick raid to capture or kill (if necessary) high-value targets, special reconnaissance in difficult to access and dangerous areas, support crowd control and riot control, support military operations, and tactical special operations.

The initial name of OMON was changed to OPON after the Azerbaijani Declaration of Independence. The unit was dissolved by the government after an OPON revolt led by Colonel Rovshan Javadov on March 13, 1995. On March 17, 1995, security forces of Azerbaijan sieged and stormed the OPON headquarters in the outskirts of Baku where Javadov, along with over 50 others, was killed.

== See also ==
- Rapid Police Unit
- Azerbaijani Armed Forces
- Internal Troops of Azerbaijan
