= 2002 Kaspiysk bombing =

Terrorist attack in Russia

- 2002 Kaspiysk bombing (Republic of Dagestan)
- Location: 42°31′48″N 47°22′48″E; Kaspiysk, Dagestan, Russia
- Date: 9 May 2002
- Target: Victory Day Parade
- Attack type: Land mine-based bombing
- Deaths: 44
- Injuries: 133
- Perpetrator: Blamed on Rappani Khalilov

The 2002 Kaspiysk bombing occurred on 9 May 2002, an attack which ripped through the military parade to commemorate the 57th anniversary of Soviet victory in the Second World War on Lenin Street in the city of Kaspiysk, Dagestan.

Forty four people, including at least 19 soldiers were killed and 133 wounded in the explosion. The explosive device represented MON-50 directional landmine enhanced for greater destructive capability.

== Related events ==
On May 16 Kaspiysk police announced that another terrorist attack had been prevented. Three terrorists were caught while planting a MON-100 mine, similar to that detonated on May 9. During the arrest, the suspects presented papers from Dagestan's Ministry of Internal affairs and said that police had no right to arrest them. Further investigation was blocked by the Russian state security service FSB, and the director of the service, Nikolai Patrushev announced that "the arrested parties had no connection with terrorists". Further fate of these suspects, one of whom was identified as Rashid Dzabrailov, remains unknown.

== Investigation ==
According to the indictment brought after the investigation, the explosion was organized by the Dagestani militant Rappani Khalilov. Khalilov allegedly sent his envoy named Kazim Abdurakhmanov to Dagestan to organize the bombing. Abdurakhmanov offered Abdulkhalim Abdulkarimov to join the plot, and Abdulkarimov agreed. Another militant, Dzhamal Turulayev, ordered Murad Abdurazakov to build the remotely controlled land mine-based bomb. The bomb was delivered to the potential explosion spot by Khanali Umakhanov. Abdulkarimov was videotaping the bomb installation, while Turulayev triggered the explosion by remote control.

However, on 1 July 2005, the jury found Abdulkhalim Abdulkarimov and Murad Abdurazakov not guilty of participating in the bombing. They were found guilty on other charges, such as participating in illegal armed formations, possessing weapons and counterfeiting documents, and they were sentenced to 14 years (Abdurazakov) and 11 years (Abdulkarimov) of imprisonment.

Khanali Umakhanov was also found not guilty of most of the charges he was facing in court (including terrorism) on 20 October 2005. He was found guilty of transporting the remote control device that triggered the bomb and sentenced to four years in prison, but the jury decided he did not know how the device was going to get used. The sentence was later reduced to two years on appeal and he was released. After release, he sued the Russian government for being tortured when in custody and unlawful prosecution. On 10 October 2007 the court found the government liable and awarded him 5,000,000 rubles (approx. USD 200,000) in punitive damages. The award was reduced to 3,000,000 rubles on appeal.

Six Russian soldiers from units deployed at Buinaksk in Dagestan were also arrested for allegedly selling an anti-personnel mine to the men who carried out the attack. They were put on trial in January 2003.

As of May 2023, none of the other people who were still wanted by the law enforcement in connection with the plot (including Turulayev and Abdurakhmanov) have been arrested. The alleged mastermind, Rappani Khalilov, was killed in Dagestan on 18 September 2007.
