= Abdul Madzhid (Dagestan rebel) =

Caucasian Emir (1974–2008)

Ilgar Mollachiev
- Abdul Madzhid

Emir of the Dagestani Front
- In office 1 October 2007 – 7 September 2008
- Preceded by: Rappani Khalilov
- Succeeded by: Omar Sheikhulayev

Personal details
- Born: 1974 Zaqatala, Azerbaijan, USSR
- Died: 7 September 2008 (aged 34) Magaramkentsky District, Dagestan, Russia
- Nickname: Emir Abdul Madzhid

Military service
- Allegiance: Caucasus Emirate
- Commands: Dagestan Front
- Battles/wars: Second Chechen War; Dagestan War; Insurgency in the North Caucasus

Ilgar Mollachiev (1974 – 7 September 2008), better known as Emir Abdul Madzhid (Majid), was the militant leader of the Shariat Jamaat of the Caucasian Front in the Second Chechen War, in the volatile southern Russian republic of Dagestan. He was the deputy of Rappani Khalilov until Khalilov's death in September 2007. He was then appointed the new leader of the Shariat Jamaat by the orders of Dokka Umarov. His nationality was Tsakhur.

== Biography ==
According to Kavkaz Center, Abdul Madzhid began his wartime career fighting in volunteer units under Aslan Maskhadov and other separatist commanders at the onset of the Second Chechen war. Although the precise time is not known Abdul Madzhid did train in camps run by Ibn al-Khattab; this helped him legitimize himself as a rebel leader in Dagestan with both Chechen separatist and foreign mujahideen leaders. After fighting many battles in Chechnya and gaining the support of top rebel leaders, he decided to go back to Dagestan to fight the Russians in his homeland and lend local rebels his training and tactics. In 2005 he joined Shariat Jamaat where he became good friends with Rappani Khalilov and where he quickly gained popularity in the rebel ranks as a charismatic commander and an expert in guerrilla warfare.

Madzhid was credited for bringing order to the resistance cells spread across the republic of Dagestan after they became decentralized due to Rappani Khalilov's death. After Khalilov's death, Abdul Madzhid was appointed the new leader of the Shariat Jamaat on the orders of Dokka Umarov, President of the Chechen Republic of Ichkeria and leader of the Caucasus Emirate. In one of his first addresses as Amir, Abdul Madzhid repeated his and Shariat Jammats oath to only attack security and military targets and to avoid civilian deaths at all cost, much like the commitment his two successors Rasul Makasharipov and Khaliov made. Even though he was born in Dagestan, Madzhid was closely connected with rebel groups fighting in the borderlands of Chechnya, which made it possible for him to find support among the Chechens and gave him an advantage in his new role as Jamaat leader.

Abdul Madzhid was responsible for creating a new jamaat located in northern Azerbaijan.

On September 7, 2008, Abdul Madzhid and three other rebels were ambushed by Russian special forces in southern Dagestan. In the ensuing battle Madzhid and at least one other rebel were killed.
