= Islamic State – Azerbaijan Province =

Branch of the Islamic State

- الدولة الإسلامية – ولاية أذربيجان; İslam Dövləti – Azərbaycan vilayəti
- Leader: Unknown (July 2019–Present)
- Dates active: July 2019–Present
- Country: Azerbaijan
- Allegiance: Islamic State
- Ideology: Islamic Statism
- Wars: Islamic State insurgency in Azerbaijan

Islamic State – Azerbaijan Province (IS-AP, Arabic: الدولة الإسلامية – ولاية أذربيجان, romanized: al-Dawlah al-Islāmīyah – Wilāyat Adharbayjān; Azerbaijani: İslam Dövləti – Azərbaycan vilayəti) is a branch of the Islamic State that emerged in 2019, based in Azerbaijan. In September 2024, ISAP claimed its first attack, targeting Azerbaijani security forces.

== History ==
The group was established in July 2019 after adherents gave bay'ah to Abu Bakr al-Baghdadi, in a video released by the Islamic State – Turkey Province. Before July 2019, the Azerbaijan Province was not considered official and consisted of unorganized cells. Supporters of the Islamic State in Azerbaijan were also supported by Boko Haram during its time in 2014 after it pledged allegiance to the Islamic State with the leader Abubakar Shekau calling them "brethren". The organization was originally associated with both the Islamic State – Caucasus Province and Islamic State – Khorasan Province where members and supporters from Azerbaijan were recruited to there. Azerbaijan Province is considered one of the main 14 distant provinces outside of the original Islamic State territorial areas of Iraq and Syria.

On September 15, 2024, an Islamic State Militant was killed in Azerbaijan. On September 19, 2024, the Islamic State announced its inaugural attack in Azerbaijan through its weekly publication, Al-Naba. In the announcement, the group asserted that it had killed seven Azerbaijani security personnel and injured one during a confrontation that took place five days earlier in Qusar District in northern Azerbaijan.
