= Israpil Velijanov =

Russian militant leader (1968–2011)

Emir of the Dagestani Front
- In office 30 August 2010 – 18 April 2011
- Preceded by: Magomed Vagabov
- Succeeded by: Ibragimkhalil Daudov

Personal details
- Born: 4 September 1968 Dagestan RSFSR USSR
- Died: 18 April 2011 (aged 42) Dagestan Russia
- Nickname: Emir Hassan

Military service
- Allegiance: Caucasus Emirate
- Commands: Vilayat Dagestan
- Battles/wars: Insurgency in the North Caucasus

Israpil Velijanov (4 September 1968 – April 18, 2011), also known as Emir Hassan, was the militant leader of the Vilayat Dagestan of the Caucasus Emirate, in the volatile southern Russian republic of Dagestan following the death of Magomed Vagabov.

== Biography ==
He was born September 4, 1968, in the village of Sanchi Kaitag in Dagestan. In 1998 Velijanov attended a military training camp in Chechnya ran by the field commander Khattab. He took part in the Invasion of Dagestan and the Second Chechen War.

He became the Emir of the Vilayat Dagestan from 30 August 2010 until his death on April 18, 2011, during a security operation near the village of Tashkapur in Dagestan.
