= Vilayat Eyvazov =

Azerbaijani politician and colonel general

- Vilayət Eyvazov
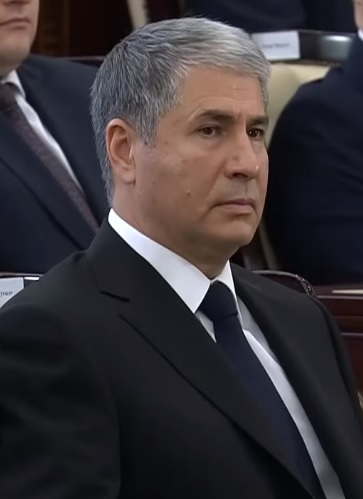
- Eyvazov in 2024

Minister of Internal Affairs
- Incumbent
- Assumed office 20 June 2019
- President: Ilham Aliyev
- Preceded by: Ramil Usubov

First Deputy Minister of Internal Affairs
- In office 11 March 2016 – 20 June 2019
- President: Ilham Aliyev

Deputy Minister of Internal Affairs
- In office 14 April 2005 – 11 March 2016
- President: Ilham Aliyev

Personal details
- Born: 28 June 1968 (age 58) Abrakunis, Julfa District, Nakhichevan ASSR, Azerbaijan SSR, USSR
- Citizenship: USSR; Azerbaijan
- Education: Police Academy of Ministry of Internal Affairs of Azerbaijan Republic
- Awards

Military service
- Rank: Colonel General

Vilayat Suleyman oglu Eyvazov (Azerbaijani: Vilayət Süleyman oğlu Eyvazov, born 28 June 1968) is an Azerbaijani politician, colonel general and incumbent Minister of Internal Affairs of Azerbaijan.

== Biography ==
Vilayat Eyvazov was born on 28 June 1968 in Abrakunis village, Julfa District. In 2000, he graduated from Police Academy of Ministry of Internal Affairs. He has been serving in Ministry of Internal Affairs since November 1994. He started his career as a police officer, served in various positions in criminal investigation agencies, served as Deputy Chief of Criminal Investigation Department of Ministry of Internal Affairs, and from 2001 to 2005, as Deputy Chief and Chief of Main Department for Combating Organized Crime.

By the Order of President of the Republic of Azerbaijan No. 293 dated 2004, he was appointed Major General of Police. By the Order No. 753 of April 14, 2005, he was appointed Deputy Minister of Internal Affairs, and by the Order No. 1889 of March 11, 2016, he was appointed First Deputy Minister of Internal Affairs. Vilayat Eyvazov was dismissed of the post of First Deputy Minister of Internal Affairs by the Order of President Ilham Aliyev on June 20, 2019 and was appointed Minister of Internal Affairs on the same date.

== Awards ==
- Azerbaijani Flag Order – 30 June 2002
- 1st degree For service to the Fatherland Order – 29 June 2018
- 2nd degree For service to the Fatherland Order – 1 July 2014
- For Heroism Medal – 1 July 2008
- 1st, 2nd and 3rd degree Medal "For impeccable service in İnternal Affairs Agencies"
- Zafar Order – 9 December 2020
