= Shariat Jamaat =

Former Islamist militant group active in the republic of Dagestan, Russia (2002–07)

Vilayat Dagestan Вилайят Дагестан
- Leaders: Rasul Makasharipov (Emir Rasul) †; Rappani Khalilov (Rabbani) †; Ilgas Malachiyev (Emir Abdul Madzhid) †; Omar Sheikhulayev (Emir Muaz) †; Umalat Magomedov (Emir Al Bara) †; Magomed Vagabov (Emir Seyfullah) †; Israpil Velijanov (Emir Hassan) †; Ibragimkhalil Daudov (Emir Salikh) †; Rustam Asildarov (Emir Abu Muhammad) †; Said Kharakansky †
- Dates active: 2002 – 7 October 2007 (As Shariat Jamaat); 7 October 2007 – 7 February 2017 (As Vilayat Dagestan)
- Active regions: Russian North Caucasus (Dagestan)
- Part of: Caucasian Front (2004–2007); Caucasus Emirate (2007–2016)
- Wars: the Second Chechen War, Insurgency in the North Caucasus

Vilayat Dagestan (lit. 'Province of Dagestan'; Russian: Вилайят Дагестан, romanized: Vilayyat Dagestan), formerly known as Shariat Jamaat (Russian: Джамаат шариат), was an Islamist Jihadist group based in the Russian republic of Dagestan and is part of the Caucasus Emirate. The group is closely associated with the separatist conflicts in the nearby Russian republics of Chechnya and Ingushetia, and was created during the Second Chechen War in favor of Dagestan's independence as an Islamic state.

The Jamaat Shariat claims to be "legitimate authority of Dagestan" with the aim of establishing a "fair society" based on sharia law. To achieve this end, the Jamaat considers it legitimate to target police and security officials and some civilians such as the government-loyalist Muslim clergy and clerics of the Russian Orthodox Church, and has been responsible for the deaths of hundreds of Russian security and military personnel, officials, and civilians.

The Jamaat says that peace talks with Russia are hypothetically possible, but only when Russia withdraws its troops from the region and provides security guarantees. Otherwise, the group claims, it is prepared for a long-term guerrilla war of attrition that may be broadened to encompass the whole of the Russian Federation, including Moscow and St. Petersburg. As of 2010, the ongoing violence has plunged the multiethnic and corruption- and poverty-plagued republic into near civil war.

== History ==
=== Jennet ===
Shariat Jamaat was established by Emir Rasul (Rasul Makasharipov) following the near-destruction of the much smaller Dagestani terrorist group called Jennet (Arabic: Paradise). In 1999, Makasharipov fought against the government during the abortive rebel invasion of Dagestan from Chechnya. After moving to fight in Chechnya, he went back to his homeland in 2002 and set up Jennet (Dzhennet), whose principal objective was to eliminate senior officers of the security forces in Dagestan.

The group was loyal to the Chechen commander Shamil Basayev and its center of operations was the republic's capital of Makhachkala along with the nearby Tarki-Tau Mountain. The insurgents managed to assassinate several important figures such as Kamil Etinbekov, the Federal Security Service's territorial head of counterintelligence and counterterrorism; Akhberdilav Akilov, head of the police department for the struggle against extremism and criminal terrorism, and 28 officers of his department; and Magomed Gusayev, the minister of national policy, information, and external relations. The 2002 Kaspiysk bombing, in which 43 soldiers and civilians were killed at a military parade, was also blamed on Makasharipov, although he rejected any responsibility and instead blamed the FSB director Nikolay Patrushev. The official Russian state media and its branches in Dagestan officially claimed that the bombing was organized by Rabbani-Khalil. It was long after Rabbani-Khalil rejected responsibility and blamed instead head of Republic of Dagestan in one of his popular videos clarifying situation around him and militants in North Caucasus with historical pretext. Apparently the motives of the head of Republic of Dagestan was to discredit and blacken the image of Muslim militants that gained quite a popularity among the local population. However, there was no response to this claim of Rabbani-Khalil from the then-head of Dagestan, Magomedali Magomedov.

=== Shariat Jamaat ===
Following the loss of several of its key leaders in late 2004, remnants of Jennet were re-organized and transformed into Sharia Jamaat (Arabic for "Islamic Law Community"). The new group, much larger and more decentralized (including the semi-autonomous local jamaats in Buinaksk, Gubden, Khasavyurt and Kaspiysk), is loosely organized mostly into many small clandestine urban cells, some with only three to five people, with a particularly strong presence in Makachkala. The Jamaat also maintains several larger guerrilla subunits of up to 15 fighters each, which are based in the forested and mountainous areas of Dagestan and occasionally engage in relatively large battles against Russian special forces backed by artillery and air support (such as a battle in March 2009 in which 16 rebels and at least five Russian troops were killed).

The new group gradually became less discriminating in their attacks, targeting even rank-and-file traffic police officers, and killing more than 40 policemen in the first half-year of 2005. In May 2005 it became part of the umbrella organization Caucasian Front established by the new president of the Chechen Republic of Ichkeria, Sheikh Abdul Halim, following the death of his predecessor Aslan Maskhadov. The group is believed to be responsible for many high-profile attacks such as the bombing which killed more than 10 Russian special forces soldiers in Makhachkala and the assassination of the republic's deputy Interior Minister, General Magomed Omarov in 2005.

Makasharipov was killed during a shootout with Russian troops on 6 July 2005, and his deputy Rabbani (Rappani Khalilov) then took over command. Rabbani was said to be an extremely popular with the youth and was able to recruit hundreds of fighters into Jamaat's ranks. He was closely allied with the Chechen rebels and the commander of foreign fighters in the Caucasus, Abu Hafs al-Urduni, and was killed in a house siege by the Russian special forces on 17 September 2007.

=== Vilayat Dagestan ===
With the statements of the new Chechen separatist leader Dokka Umarov, published by Kavkaz Center on 1 October 2007, Khalilov was replaced by his deputy, Abdul Majid (Ilgas Malachiyev). Majid had begun his career during the Second Chechen War, fighting under Mashkadov and Ibn al-Khattab, before joining the Jamaat in 2005; this helped legitimize him as a rebel leader in Dagestan with the leaderships of both Chechen rebels and foreign fighters. Abdul Majid took the Jamaat oath to not attack civilians and was credited with bringing order to the group after the death of Khalilov. On 8 September 2008, he was killed in a battle in southern Dagestan on the border with Azerbaijan in a joint operation of Russian and Azeri special forces. Following the death of Abu Majid, Umarov (now as the leader of the self-styled Caucasus Emirate) appointed Emir Muaz (Omar Sheikhulayev) to lead the renamed Vilayat of Dagestan. Emir Muaz was killed on 5 February 2009 in a gunfight with Russian special forces in a suburb of Makachkala. He was replaced two months later by Emir Bara (Umalat Magomedov), who was in turn killed in a shootout at a police checkpoint in Makachkala on 31 December 2009. His place was then taken by Magomed Vagabov, whose leadership apparently resulted in the end to the ban on indiscriminate attacks against civilian targets. Vagabov was killed in a firefight when the federal forces surrounded him in a house in the village of Gunib on 21 August 2010.

The continued upsurge of violence in Dagestan since 2008 included the killing of Gen. Valery Lipinsky, the first deputy head of the Internal Troops in the North Caucasus; the sniper assassination of Dagestan's Interior Minister, Gen. Adilgerei Magomedtagirov; and the massacre of four policemen and seven alleged prostitutes at a bathhouse in Makhachkala. In 2009, at least 58 police officers were killed in Dagestan. The Vilayat Dagestan was responsible for a suicide attack on 6 January 2010 that killed six policemen; twin bombings in which two female bombers killed more than 40 people in the Moscow Metro in March 2010; and several suicide attacks against Russian security and military installations (such as the double bombing which killed 12 in Kizlyar). In February 2012, the Vilayat's then leader, Ibragimkhalil Daudov (aka Emir Salikh), was killed by Russian security forces.

In December 2014, the Vilayat's then commander, Rustam Asildarov, and a number of other members of the group publicly retracted their oath of allegiance to Caucasus Emirate leader Aliaskhab Kebekov, and pledged loyalty to Islamic State leader Abu Bakr al-Baghdadi. Kebekov condemned the defectors and appointed Said Kharakansky as the new leader of the group in Dagestan. Kharakansky and Kebekov's successor, Magomed Suleymanov, were killed by Russian security forces in clashes in August 2015.

== See also ==
- Islamic Jamaat of Dagestan
- William Plotnikov
