= Rasul Makasharipov =

Russian Islamist Jihadist

Rasul Makasharipov (Russian: Расул Макашарипов)
- Nickname(s): Muslim
- Born: 1972; Tsumadinsky District, Dagestan, Russian SFSR, Soviet Union
- Died: 6 July 2005 (aged 32-33); Makhachkala, Dagestan
- Allegiance: Shariat Jamaat; Caucasian Front
- Battles / wars: War of Dagestan; Second Chechen War

Rasul Makasharipov (Russian: Расул Макашарипов; 1972 – July 6, 2005), nicknamed Muslim and also known as Emir Rasul, was a Dagestani Islamist leader in southern Russia. He was the founder of the militant group Dzhennet and later created the rebel group Shariat Jamaat, which sought to unite Caucasian Muslims under Islamic rule and later became part of the Caucasian Front.

== Biography ==
Rasul Makasharipov was a native of Dagestan's south-western Tsumadinsky District, bordering Chechnya and inhabited by Caucasian Avars. In 1997 his father expelled him from the house and he moved to Chechnya, where he became an Avar interpreter of Arab warlord Khattab and the rogue Chechen field commander Shamil Basayev during their abortive Invasion of Dagestan in 1999. Makasharipov surrendered to Dagestani authorities in 2000, but was released under an amnesty a year later.

Within a year he began assembling his own organization, finding willing recruits from young Dagestanis who had suffered at the hands of the police. According to one of his followers, "Makasharipov spoke about the necessity to stop persecution and humiliation of Muslims in Dagestan. He said this could be done by killing policemen." (The Moscow Times, March 15, 2005) The organization became known as the Dzhennet (Arabic: Paradise) group and soon started assassinating high-ranking police officials, investigators and prosecutors; the group was destroyed by the Russian crackdown in 2002, with Makasharipov being reportedly the sole survivor who remained free.

The same year, Makasharipov found his new group, the Shariat Jamaat, which in May 2005 became part of the Caucasian Front established by the new President of the Chechen Republic of Ichkeria Abdul-Halim Sadulayev after the death of Aslan Maskhadov. On January 15, 2005, the FSB reported his death in an attack on a Jamaat safehouse, but Makasharipov surfaced four days later to refute these claims. Makasharipov was eventually killed in a shootout with Russian troops on July 6, 2005; his deputy Rappani Khalilov became his successor as the leader of the Shariat Jamaat.
