= Magomed Vagabov =

Russian rebel (1975–2010)

Emir of the Dagestani Front
- In office 15 July 2010 – 21 August 2010
- Preceded by: Umalat Magomedov
- Succeeded by: Israpil Velijanov

Supreme Qadi of the Sharia Court
- In office 15 July 2010 – 21 August 2010
- Preceded by: Anzor Astemirov
- Succeeded by: Aliaskhab Kebekov

Personal details
- Born: 1 January 1975 Gubden, Dagestan ASSR, RSFSR, USSR
- Died: 21 August 2010 (aged 35) Gunib, Dagestan, Russia
- Nickname: Emir Seyfullah

Military service
- Allegiance: Caucasus Emirate
- Commands: Vilayat Dagestan
- Battles/wars: Insurgency in the North Caucasus

Magomed Vagabov, also known as Emir Seyfullah or Seyfullah Gubdensky, (1 January 1975 – 21 August 2010) was the leader of the militant Vilayat Dagestan organisation in the Russian Republic of Dagestan, and the Supreme Qadi of the Caucasus Emirate.

== Biography ==
An ethnic Dargin, Vagabov was born in the Dagestani village of Gubden. In 1990, he took part in rallies, led by the Salafist Sheikh Muhammad Bagauddin, for Soviet Muslims to be allowed to make the Hajj pilgrimage. After the collapse of the Soviet Union, a group of Arabs in the Islamic missionary organisation Tablighi Jamaat visited his native village in 1992. Vagabov, who spoke Arabic, served as their interpreter, and travelled with them around Dagestan.

In 1994 the 19-year-old Vagabov went for religious instruction in Pakistan, where he memorized the Koran. He moved on to Karachi, where he studied Shariah and learnt Farsi and Urdu. In 1997 he returned to Dagestan and open a mosque in Gubden. In the same year he reportedly travelled to Chechnya and attended a training camp ran by the Arab field commander Khattab.

He returned to Dagestan, and took part in militant activities before he turned himself into the authorities in 2001 during an amnesty. He would return to militancy and work his way up the ranks of Shariat Jamaat. In mid-July 2010, Dokku Umarov appointed Vagabov as both the emir of Vilayat Dagestan and the Qadi of the Caucasus Emirate Sharia court, filling the positions previously held by the late Umalat Magomedov and Anzor Astemirov respectively.

In 2010 he took part in organizing the 2010 Moscow Metro bombings, killing 40 people and wounding more than 100. It was reported that one of the suicide bombers, Mariam Sharipova, was his wife, although her father denied this.

Vagabov and 4 other militants were killed during a raid by the FSB in the village of Gunib in August 2010.
