= Magomed Omarov (politician) =

Russian politician (1947–2005)

Deputy Interior Minister of Dagestan
- In office 1996 – 2 February 2005
- President: Vladimir Putin

Personal details
- Born: 15 June 1947 Mekegi, Russia
- Died: 2 February 2005 (aged 57) Makhachkala, Russia
- Cause of death: Assassination

Military service
- Rank: Major General

Magomed Omarovich Omarov (Russian: Магомед Омарович Омаров; 15 June 1947 – 2 February 2005) was a Russian politician. He served as the deputy interior minister for the Russian Republic of Dagestan in 1996 until his assassination in 2005.

== Career ==
Omarov was a major general. He was serving as a deputy to Dagestan's then interior minister late Adilgerei Magomedtagirov. In 1996, Magomed Omarov was appointed Deputy Minister of internal Affairs of the Republic of Dagestan – chief of the public security police of the Republic. In August – September 1999, during the invasion of Chechen and international militants in Dagestan, Colonel Omarov from the first day was in the combat zone, led the fighting of the Dagestan police and coordinated their actions with parts of the Russian troops

== Death ==
On 2 February 2005, he and his three bodyguards were shot multiple times by unidentified gunmen in Makhachkala. He was rushed to the hospital and was pronounced dead at the scene. He was 57 years old. Cars "Niva" and VAZ-21099, one containing the Deputy Minister and the other his guards, were fired upon by two parties using automatic weapons at the intersection of Lenin and Magomed Yaragsky streets near the Drama theater. In total, Omarov, three bodyguards and three interior Ministry employees were killed.

The assassination occurred a month after the government announced they prevented a "terrorist attack." Omarov had coordinated all major anti-insurgent operations in the republic and had narrowly escaped another assassination attempt in May 2003 in Makhachkala. .

== See also ==
- List of Heroes of the Russian Federation
