= Rappani Khalilov =

Dagestani militant (1969–2007)

- Khalilov (centre) together with Sheikh Abdul-Halim and Abu Hafs al-Urduni.
- Nickname: Rabbani
- Born: 27 October 1969; Buynaksk, Dagestan
- Died: 17 September 2007 (aged 37) Novy Sulak, Dagestan
- Allegiance: Shariat Jamaat
- Conflicts: Invasion of Dagestan; Second Chechen War

Rappani Khalilov (Russian: Раппани Халилов) (October 27, 1969 – September 17, 2007), also known as Rabbani, was the militant leader of the Shariat Jamaat of the Caucasian Front during the Second Chechen War, in the volatile southern Russian republic of Dagestan. He was killed on September 17, 2007, in a fierce shoot-out with the Russian special forces.

== Biography ==
=== Early life and militant activity ===
Khalilov was an ethnic Lak, the sixth largest ethnic group in Dagestan. Khalilov was born and grew up in the city of Buynaksk in Dagestan. Khalilov's first name, Rabbani, means "pertaining to God" in Arabic and is rendered Rappani in local dialect.

Khalilov was unknown to Dagestani security forces prior to 1998. In the Soviet times he had served as a border guard along the border with Mongolia; after that, he was a co-owner of a family bakery. Khalilov came to the attention of the authorities in 1998 when he married the sister of the foreign mujahideen commander Ibn al-Khattab's ethnic Dargin wife; he moved to her home village of Karamakhi, which acquired notoriety in the summer of the same year, when its residents introduced Sharia law and declared an Islamic state. Khalilov grew close to local Islamist ideologists and is thought to have met Khattab and Shamil Basayev at a militant training camp in Serzhen-Yurt, south-eastern Chechnya. In 1999 he was involved in the Dagestan War in which Khattab and Basayev sought to create an Islamic superstate out of Chechnya and Dagestan. After that raid was suppressed, he created his own unit of mostly Dagestani rebels.

=== Leader of Dagestani insurgency ===
Khalilov first became well known after the January 18, 2002, bombing of a Russian military truck, which killed seven Interior Ministry soldiers in the capital of Dagestan, Makhachkala. He was soon blamed by the FSB to have ordered the bombing of a parade near the military barracks in the city of Kaspiysk during a Russian Victory Day celebrations on May 9, 2002, but Khalilov and Shariat Jamaat always denied responsibility for this attack saying they don't target civilians (the blast killed at least 19 soldiers and 15 civilians, including 12 children).

Khalilov was thought to operate in south-eastern Chechnya and the mountainous regions of western Dagestan. According to one expert cited by Radio Free Europe, "Khalilov's name and reputation was indeed comparable to that of Basayev." According to the Russian newspaper Kommersant, Khalilov was "highly popular with the local youth, whom he is actively drawing into his ranks." It has been claimed that he refrained from attacking civilians and instead targeted strictly police and military targets, as well as government officials and politicians across the poverty-stricken republic of Dagestan.

After former Chechen President Sheikh Abdul-Halim opened up the Caucasian Front to spread the insurgency across the entire North Caucasus region of Russia, it is thought that Khalilov came under the authority of the Chechen rebels. This was confirmed when in a September 2006 decree, Doku Umarov, the successor to Abdul-Halim Sadulayev named Khalilov as a brigadier general and made him as the commander of the Dagestan front.

=== Death and legacy ===
On September 17, 2007, Russian special forces launched an operation in the Dagestani settlement of Novy Sulak. Two gunmen were blocked in a private residence by several hundred heavily armed republican and federal MVD troops; after the fighters refused to surrender, a 12-hour gun battle ensued during which the MVD troops were reinforced by the FSB Vympel special forces unit. According to the official information, only two troops were wounded in the firefight, but according to IWPR one was killed and ten were wounded. RPO-A flamethrowers were used by the commandos to destroy the house, but the shooting only ceased at dawn of the next day, when the residence was crushed to the ground by an army tank and seven armoured personnel carriers.

After examining the rubble, two bodies were recovered, identified as belonging to Rappani Khalilov and his deputy and right-hand man Nabi Nabiyev (also known as Abdurakhman); Khalilov's death was later confirmed by the rebel sources. Russian authorities announced they would not release the corpses for burial; Doku Umarov honored his fallen subordinate by granting Khalilov the posthumous rank of general and the "Honor of the Nation" award, the highest decoration bestowed within the separatist movement. Khalilov's deputy Abdul Madzhid became his official successor.
