= Ministry of Internal Affairs (Azerbaijan) =

Government ministry of Azerbaijan

Ministry of Internal Affairs of Azerbaijan Republic
- Azərbaycan Respublikasının Daxili İşlər Nazirliyi
- Insignia of Ministry of Internal Affairs

Agency overview
- Formed: May 28, 1918
- Jurisdiction: Azerbaijan
- Headquarters: 7 Azerbaijan Ave, Baku, AZ1005
- Agency executive: Vilayet Eyvazov, Minister of Internal Affairs
- Child agency: Police Academy
- Website: www.mia.gov.az

The Ministry of Internal Affairs of Azerbaijan (Azerbaijani: Azərbaycan Respublikasının Daxili İşlər Nazirliyi) is an Azerbaijani government ministry for internal affairs, which is responsible for keeping the order, security and safety of population, officials, buildings and structures in the country. The Minister of Internal Affairs of Azerbaijan is appointed and removed from the post by the Commander-in-chief of the Azerbaijani Armed Forces, the President of Azerbaijan.

The current Minister of Internal Affairs is Vilayət Eyvazov.

== History ==
The Ministry of Internal Affairs was first established under the government of Azerbaijan Democratic Republic upon its proclamation of independence on May 28, 1918. Being a government authority in charge of the police force, it played a vital role in state building of Azerbaijan. However, on April 28, 1920 when Azerbaijan fell under the Soviet rule, the ministry was transferred under the authority of the Ministry of Internal Affairs of the USSR. The employees of the ministry distinguished themselves during the Great Patriotic War with about 800 of them receiving various awards and medals for courage and struggle against Nazi Germany.

After restoration of independence of Azerbaijan on October 18, 1991 when the ministry was re-established as the Ministry of Azerbaijan Republic, Azerbaijani law enforcement employees fought during the first Nagorno-Karabakh War with 932 of them killed during the war. Sixty six of the police employees received the National Hero of Azerbaijan award, 86 of them were given the Azerbaijani Flag Order and 247 with other medals and orders of Azerbaijan Republic. In 1992, Azerbaijan joined the International Criminal Police Organization (Interpol) and the National Central Bureau (NCB) of Interpol was established within the Ministry of Internal Affairs on November 24, 1992. On June 30, 2004 the Department of Internal Security was created within the ministry to conduct corporate control over the MIA services, prevention of activities incompatible with the service of Azerbaijani police, exposure of corrupt officers, etc.

== Police ==
The police is the main law enforcement body in Azerbaijan, operating under the interior ministry. The Baku City Main Police Department (BMPD) is the oldest police department in Azerbaijan. After the annexation of Azerbaijan to the Russian Empire in 1828, a commandant's office was established in the area. On 10 April 1840, a police department subordinated to the Ministry of Internal Affairs of the Russian Empire was established in Baku. The Baku City Police Department began its activity on 1 January 1841. On 7 March 1917, the Baku City Militia was established under the Executive Committee of the Baku Council of Workers' Deputies. On 13 November, the police were disbanded in Baku, and the Baku Soviet decided to organize a Soviet militia instead.

The Ganja Police Department has operated since 2011. The National Police are also responsible for enforcing the law in the Nakhchivan Autonomous Republic via a specialized department and the Nakhchivan City Police Department. Law enforcement in Nagorno-Karabakh was previously split between the Azerbaijani police and the Nagorno-Karabakh Defense Army. Following the 2020 Nagorno-Karabakh war, the Shusha Police Department was relocated back to Shusha from Tatar. A police department was also created in the Kalbajar District.

2 July is celebrated as Azerbaijan Police Day. On the eve of the 100th anniversary of the Azerbaijani police, a march composed by Aydan Aliyeva (an employee of the BMPD) and performed by soloist of the State Musical Comedy Theater Samad Khasiyev was published.

== Internal Troops ==
The Internal Troops of Azerbaijan (Azerbaijani: Azərbaycan Respublikası Daxili Qoşunları) is the uniformed gendarmerie of Azerbaijan which is subordinated to the Ministry of Internal Affairs The Internal Troops are the descendant of the Soviet Union's Internal Troops, and are used to restoring public order, quell internal armed conflicts and to safeguard important facilities. During wartime, the Internal Troops fall under the jurisdiction of the Azerbaijani Land Forces. 12 March is defined as a "Day of Internal Troops".

== Educational institutions ==
=== Police Academy ===
Under the decision of the People's Commissariat of Internal Affairs of Azerbaijan, the Police Academy was created as a school preparing ordinary militias and commanders in 1921. It operated in Baku till 1936. This school was moved to Mardaken district of Baku in the same year. In 1957 the Militia School of Baku was transformed into the Secondary Special Militia School of Baku of the USSR Ministry of Internal Affairs. The diploma of the secondary lawyer was presented to the school graduates. The education lasts for two years in the school.

From 1957-1961, the school prepared specialists for several countries such as Georgia, Dagestan, Kabardino-Balkaria, Altai, Irkutsk, Krasnodar, Kuibyshev, Novosibirsk, Kemerovo, Saratov and tens of other cities and countries. The Police Academy was established at the Ministry of Internal Affairs on the basis of the N. Rzayev Special Police College pursuant to the Presidential Decree of May 23, 1992 approved by the Cabinet of Ministers of Azerbaijan on June 9, 1992.

=== High Military School of Internal Troops ===
The High Military School of Internal Troops of Azerbaijan was created in accordance with the presidential decree dated 25 February 2011 on the base of the Vocational Military School of the Internal Troops. Regulation of the military school was confirmed by the presidential decree in 2012. High Military School of Internal Troops is situated in Baku and led by Ilqar Mammadov.

Military School is responsible for preparing special-military educated personnel, improving specialties of military officers and implementing scientific-investigation issues. Educational duration is four years and trainings and subjects are defined relating to the European Credit Transfer System (ECTS) that guarantees academic recognition of studies abroad. The High Military School gives two specialties to the graduates such as, military and civil specialty. "High Special-Military Educated Military Officer" is a military specialty and "Physical Education and Initial Preparation Teacher" is a civil specialty. At the same time graduates gain both bachelor's degree and a lieutenant's commission.

== International relations ==
The Ministry of Internal Affairs of Azerbaijan keeps close cooperative relationships with the United Nations Organization, European Union, The Organization of Security of Cooperation in Europe, European Council, International Organization for Migration, and International Organization of the Red Cross and other international and regional organizations.

This Ministry also maintains close cooperation with the Black Sea Organization for Economic Cooperation, the Organization for Economic Cooperation, GUAM and the Initiative of Cooperation in Southeastern Europe.

== Structure ==
- Secretariat
- Steering Department
- Orderly Divisions Control Department
- Investigation Department
- Inquiry Department
- Department for Combat with Organized Crime
- Department for Struggle Against Drugs
- Department for Internal Security
- Department for Criminality Investigations
- Department for Statistic and Operative Information
- Department for Social Security
- Department for Internal Troops
- Transport Police Department
- Department for Road Police
- Department for Fire Security
- Department for Defense
- Department for Registration and Passport
- National Central Bureau of Interpol
- Head Department for Human Resources
- Department for Internal Investigation
- Department for Work with the Personnel
- Department for International Cooperation
- Department for Communication
- Press Service
- Department for Financial Planning
- Provision Department
- Medical Department
- Commandant Services
- Department for Fundamental Construction
- Sports Society
- Department for Mobilization and Civil Defense

== See also ==
- Law enforcement in Azerbaijan
- Special Purpose Police Unit (OPON)
- Internal Troops of Azerbaijan
- Cabinet of Azerbaijan
