= Ramiz Aliguliyev =

Ramiz Mahammad Aliguliyev
- Ramiz Məhəmməd oğlu Alıquliyev
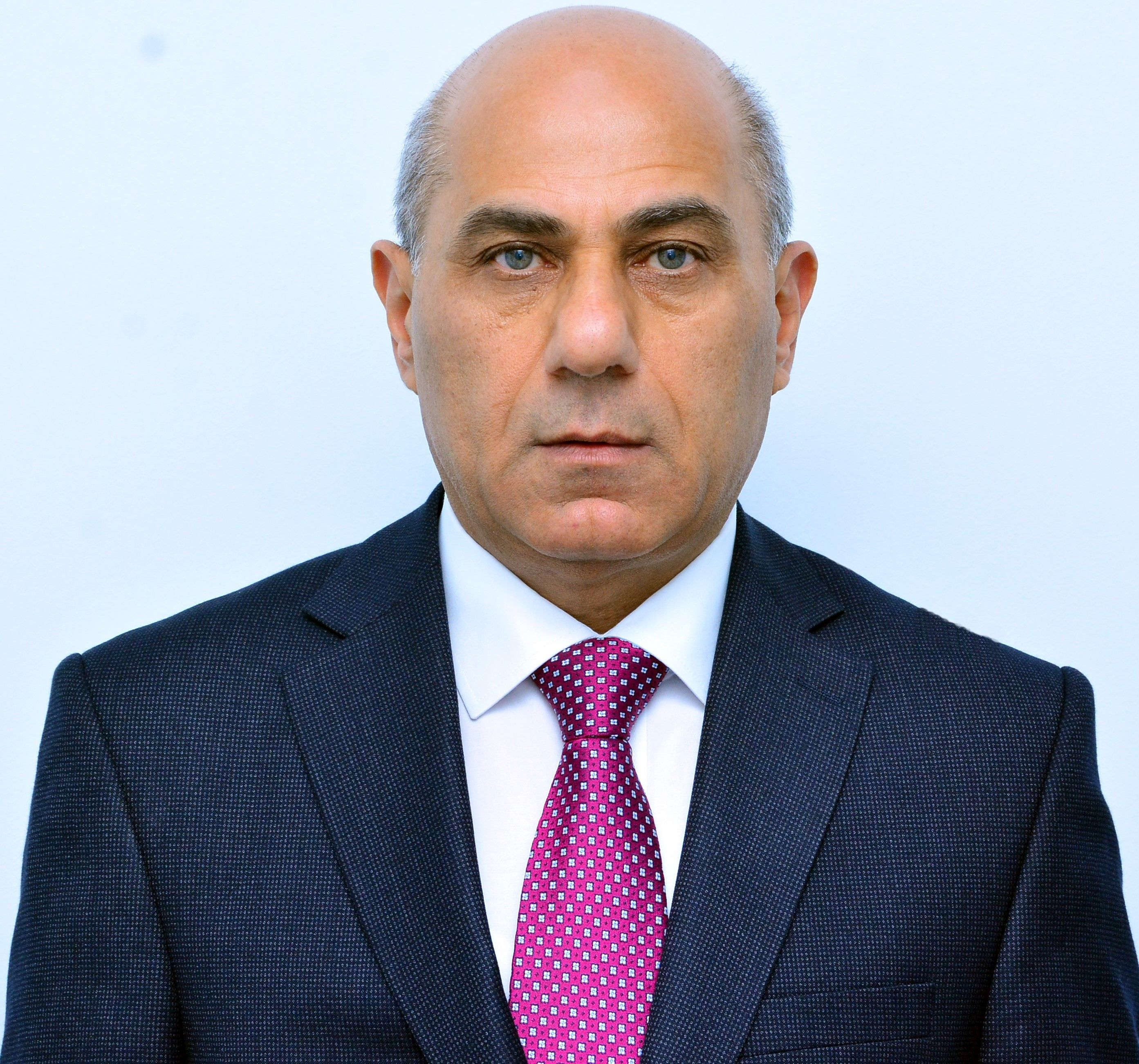
- Born: March 20, 1961 (age 65); Barda district, Azerbaijan SSR, USSR
- Citizenship: Azerbaijan
- Education: Azerbaijan State University
- Known for: Director of the Institute of Data Science and Artificial Intelligence at Azerbaijan Technical University, head of department at the Institute of Information Technology of the Ministry of Science and Education. Corresponding member of ANAS, doctor of technical sciences
- Awards: Tereggi Medal
- Scientific career
- Fields: Artificial intelligence, Information security, Data Mining, Big data analytics, Text mining.
- Workplaces: Institute of Information Technology, Ministry of Science and Education, Azerbaijan
- Thesis: Methods and algorithms for text mining (2010)
- Doctoral advisor: Ali Abbasov and Rasim Alguliyev

Notes
- Bibliography at Wikibooks (in Azerbaijani)

Ramiz Aliguliyev (Azerbaijani: Ramiz Məhəmməd oğlu Alıquliyev; March 20, 1961) is an Azerbaijani computer scientist, director of the Institute of Data Science and Artificial Intelligence at Azerbaijan Technical University, head of department at the Institute of Information Technology of Ministry of Science and Education, doctor of technical sciences, professor, corresponding member of Azerbaijan National Academy of Sciences (ANAS).

== Biography ==
Ramiz Aliguliyev was born on March 20, 1961, in Barda district, Azerbaijan SSR.

In 1983, he graduated from the Faculty of Applied Mathematics of the Azerbaijan State University named after S. M. Kirov (currently Baku State University).

In 1983-1988, he worked at the Institute of Cybernetics of the Azerbaijan SSR Academy of Sciences, and in 1988-2002, at the Institute of Mathematics and Mechanics.

In 2003, he worked as the head of the sector at the Institute of Information Technology, and since 2004, he has been working as the head of the department.

In 2017, he was elected a corresponding member of ANAS.

== Research areas ==
Artificial Intelligence; Data Mining; Big Data Analytics; Natural Language Processing (NLP); Text Mining; E-government Analysis; Scientometrics; Evolutionary and Swarm Intelligence Algorithms.

== Scientific activity ==
In 2000-2002, he completed his doctoral studies at the Institute of Mathematics and Mechanics (now the Institute of Mathematics).

In 2002, he defended his PhD dissertation entitled “Investigation of the Qualitative Properties of Solutions to Second-Order Degenerate Elliptic Equations” for the degree of Candidate of Physical and Mathematical Sciences (Doctor of Philosophy) in the specialty 01.01.02 (1211.01) – Differential Equations at the Dissertation Council of the Institute of Mathematics and Mechanics (now the Institute of Mathematics).

In 2004–2009, he completed the Doctor of Sciences program at the Institute of Information Technology. In 2010, he defended his doctoral dissertation entitled “Methods and Algorithms for Intelligent Analysis of Textual Information” at the Dissertation Council of the Institute of Cybernetics (now the Institute of Mathematics) for the degree of Doctor of Technical Sciences.

In 2019, he was invited to Federation University Australia to conduct joint research.

Aliguliyev has supervised 4 completed PhDs and is currently supervising 12 PhD students.

== Editorial board member ==
- CAAI Transactions on Intelligence Technology
- TWMS Journal of Pure and Applied Mathematics
- International Journal of Decision Support System Technology
- Problems of Information Technology
- Problems of Information Society
- Informatics and Control Problems
- International Journal of Sensors, Wireless Communications and Control
- Turkish Journal of Mathematics & Computer Science
- Communications
- Artificial Intelligence Evolution
- Ukrainian Journal of Information Systems and Data Science

== Publications and citations ==
Google Scholar

Web of Science

Scopus

ORCID

== Awards ==
In 2013, his article was awarded 1st place for the best scientific work in the "3rd Joint ICT Award Competition" held by the Science Development Foundation under the president of the Republic of Azerbaijan, together with the Ministry of Communications and Information Technology.

In 2014, he was awarded the "Taraggi" medal by the order of the president of the Republic of Azerbaijan.

From 2020 to 2026, Ramiz Aliguliyev has been ranked among the world's top 2% of scientists in artificial intelligence by Stanford University
