= Abdul Khalig =

Azerbaijani painter and pedagogue

Abdul Khalig Əbdül Xalıq
- Born: May 5, 1920; Baku, Baku Uyezd, Azerbaijan SSR
- Died: September 30, 1988 (aged 68); Baku, Azerbaijan SSR, USSR
- Education: Azerbaijan State Art School; Moscow State Art Institute
- Known for: painting
- Style: portrait, landscape painting, still life
- Awards: Honored Art Worker of the Azerbaijan SSR

Abdulkhalig Abdul Ali oghlu Rzaguliyev (Azerbaijani: Əbdülxalıq Əbdül Əli oğlu Rzaquliyev, May 5, 1920 – September 30, 1988) was an Azerbaijani painter, pedagogue, Honored Art Worker of the Azerbaijan SSR.

== Biography ==
Abdulkhalig Rzaguliyev was born on May 5, 1920, in Baku. He studied at the Azerbaijan State Art School in 1934–1939, and a year later was admitted to the Moscow State Art Institute, but returned to Baku, leaving his higher education unfinished due to the outbreak of the Great Patriotic War. During the war, he worked with his colleagues Boyukagha Mirzazade, Latif Fayzullayev and Baghir Maratli at the Azerbaijan State Art School, and after the war, he continued his education at the Moscow Art Institute, defended his diploma and returned to Baku in 1949.

Abdulkhalig Rzaguliyev continued his pedagogical activity, worked as a teacher at the Baku State Art School named after Azim Azimzade, Azerbaijan State Institute of Arts. He died on September 30, 1988.

== Career ==
The artist's work consists of plot paintings, portraits, still lifes and landscapes. In 1940, he publicized the painting "Holiday on the Collective Farm", and at the first "Autumn Exhibition" in 1946, he displayed the "Landscape" and "Bazaar" boards. His post-war works include the large-scale "Song of the Tractor Driver" (1957) and "Reporters" (1961). At the republican exhibitions held in the 1950s, his paintings of various genres, as well as his etudes of "Still Life", "Pirsaat Chay", "Twilight", "Mountains", "Sunny Day" and "Landscape" were exhibited.

Abdul Khalig's works in the genres of landscape and still life include paintings on Italian, Turkish and American life, "May Demonstration in Baku" (1943), "Grape Harvest" (1946), "Wildflowers" (1955), "Still Life with Birds" (1957), "Street in Istanbul" (1960), "Field Camp" (1963) and others. He was an author of "Gachag Nabi" (1959), "Nariman Narimanov" (1969), "Aliagha Vahid" (1970), "Azim Azimzade" (1970), "Mother" (1970), "Ziya Bunyadov" (1978), "Mehdi Huseynzadeh" and other portraits, as well as etudes addressed to Shamakhi, Zagatala, Moscow, Istanbul and Baku.

The artist's work in the 1960s is covered by labor-themed paintings "Collective Farmer Sevil Gaziyeva", "Collective Farm Yard", "Collective Farmer Woman", "Fishermen", "Labor Square", "Lankaran Fishermen" and "Harvest Holiday", and "Chukhuryurd", "Altiagaj" and "Landscape" glorifying the contact points of workers. In those years, Abdulkhalig visited Turkey and Italy as a member of Soviet artists. Together with his art friends Baba Aliyev and Salam Salamzade, he exhibited 34 works, including 20 portraits and 14 landscapes, at a group exhibition in 1962. His work "Venice" is in the permanent exposition of the National Art Museum of Azerbaijan.

The artist's works have been exhibited in Georgia, Moldova, Lithuania, Latvia, Czechoslovakia, Egypt, Syria, Lebanon and other countries. His works are kept in museums and private collections in Baku, Moscow and Istanbul.

== Literature ==
- Azərbaycan Milli Ensiklopediyası: [25 cilddə]. Vol. 8-ci cild (Enollar – Fedin). Bakı: "Azərbaycan Milli Ensiklopediyası" Elmi Mərkəzi. 2018.
- Габибов, Н. Д. (1982). Живопись Советского Азербайджана. Баку.
