= Baba Aliyev =

Azerbaijani painter

Baba Aliyev Baba Əliyev
- Born: March 22, 1915; Zira, Baku Uyezd, Baku Governorate, Russian Empire
- Died: March 27, 1991 (aged 76); Baku, Azerbaijan SSR, USSR
- Education: Azerbaijan State Art School; Moscow State Art Institute
- Known for: painting
- Style: portrait, landscape painting, still life
- Awards: People's Artist of the Azerbaijan SSR Honored Art Worker of the Azerbaijan SSR

Baba Balababa oghlu Aliyev (Azerbaijani: Baba Balababa oğlu Əliyev, March 22, 1915 — March 27, 1991) was an Azerbaijani painter, People's Artist of the Azerbaijan SSR, and Chairman of the Union of Artists of Azerbaijan.

== Biography ==
Baba Aliyev was born on March 22, 1915, in Zira settlement. He graduated from the Azerbaijan State Art School in 1937, and in 1941 from the Moscow State Art Institute named after Surikov.

Baba Aliyev had been a member of the CPSU since 1945. He served as chairman of the Union of Artists of Azerbaijan and was a member of the Artists' Union of the USSR.

The artist taught at the Azerbaijan State Art School named after Azim Azimzade in 1946-1960. Baba Aliyev died on March 27, 1991, in Baku.

== Career ==
Portraits and still lifes are the main genres in the artist's work. He started art in the years of the Great Patriotic War, and the artistic images of frontline fighters have a special place in his work during these years. Baba Aliyev's "Heroism of Pilot Mazahir Abbasov" (1947), portraits of Commissar Novruz Aslanov and Colonel S. Suprun are considered as such. His portrait "Suprun, Hero of the Soviet Union" was displayed at the Great Patriotic War exhibition in Tbilisi in 1942.

In the post-war years, Baba Aliyev, like other artists, began to describe generalized artistic images of working people. In 1951, together with Abdul Khalig and A. Zarubin, he worked on a large panel entitled "Cotton Delivery to the State" dedicated to the work of cotton growers. This work was exhibited at the All-Union Exhibition in 1951. The artist tried to show the nature of the work of oil workers in such works as "Before the turn" (1959), "Rest of oil workers" (1961), "New force" (1963).

Baba Aliyev was the author of a number of portraits such as "Portrait of a Girl" (1957), "Portrait of a collective farmer F. Abdullayeva" (1962), "Nurse" (1983), "Jovdat Hajiyev" (1986), "Moonlit Night" (1962), "Peaches" (1964), "Evening in Goygol" (1978) and other landscapes and still lifes.

In the 1960s, the artist preferred a strict style. His works of this kind include "Rest of the Oil Workers" (1961) and "Rest of the Tankers" (1965).

== Memorial ==
According to the order of the President of the Azerbaijan Republic "On perpetuation of the memory of Baba Aliyev" dated November 28, 2005, a street named after the artist was given in Zira settlement of Baku, a memorial plaque was placed at III Magomayev sidestreet, 3.

An exhibition dedicated to the 100th anniversary of Baba Aliyev opened at the National Art Museum of Azerbaijan on June 7, 2016.

== Awards ==
- People's Artist of the Azerbaijan SSR — December 1, 1982
- Honored Art Worker of the Azerbaijan SSR — June 29, 1964
- Honorary Decree of the Presidium of the Supreme Soviet of the Azerbaijan SSR — Mart 21, 1985

== Literature ==
- Azərbaycan Milli Ensiklopediyası: [25 cilddə]. Vol. 8-ci cild (Enollar – Fedin). Bakı: "Azərbaycan Milli Ensiklopediyası" Elmi Mərkəzi. 2018.
- Ҹ. Б. Гулијев, ed. (1980). Азәрбајҹан Совет Енсиклопедијасы: [10 ҹилддə]. Vol. IV ҹилд (Елдəҝəз – Итабира). Бакы: Азәрбајҹан Совет Енсиклопедијасынын Баш Редаксиjасы.
- Искусство Советского Азербайджана. Vol. Живопись, скульптура, графика. Коллектив авторов. Москва: Советский художник. 1970.
- Кәримова, Р. (1964). Азәрбајҹан совет портрет бојакарлығы. Бакы: Азәрбајҹан ССР Елмләр Академијасы Нәшријјаты. pp. 178 сәһ.
