= Rasim Alguliyev =

Azerbaijani researcher

Rasim Mahammad Alguliyev
- Born: January 20, 1958 (age 68)
- Education: Azerbaijan Polytechnic Institute named after C.Ildirim, Institute of Cybernetics (postgraduate)
- Known for: Vice-President of ANAS. Doctor of technical sciences, full member of ANAS
- Awards: Tereggi Medal, Azerbaijan Democratic Republic 100th anniversary medal
- Scientific career
- Fields: Information technologies, artificial intelligence, information security.
- Workplaces: Azerbaijan National Academy of Sciences

Rasim Alguliyev (Azerbaijani: Rasim Məhəmməd oğlu Əliquliyev; January 20, 1958) — doctor of technical sciences, professor, full member (academician) of Azerbaijan National Academy of Sciences (ANAS), vice-president of ANAS, director-general of the Institute of Information Technology of the Ministry of Science and Education of the Republic of Azerbaijan.

== Personal life ==
- Rasim Alguliyev was born on January 20, 1958, in Barda district, Azerbaijan.
- In 1979 he graduated from Azerbaijan Polytechnic Institute named after Ch.Ildirim (now Azerbaijan Technical University) in "Electronic Computing Machines" speciality.
- In 1983–1986, he completed his PhD in "Automated control systems" at the Institute of Cybernetics (now Institute of Control Systems) of Azerbaijan Academy of Sciences (AAS).
- In 1979–1986 he worked as an engineer and senior engineer, Komsomol secretary at the Institute of Cybernetics of AAS.
- In 1986 he was transferred to the Automated Control Systems (ACS) Department of AAS.
- In 1986–1997 he worked at positions of senior engineer, leading engineer, chief engineer of the project "Republican network of computing centers and data transmission" at the ACS Department of AAS (in 1997 the Information-Telecommunication Scientific Center – ITSC was established on the basis of the ACS Department). Since 1997 he worked as a chief engineer-deputy director of the ITSC.
- He is the director of the Institute of Information Technology since 2002 (the institute was established because of the ITSC in 2002).
- He held position of academician-secretary of ANAS from 2013 to 2019.
- In 2019 he was elected vice-president of ANAS.
- In 2009 he was awarded the "Taraggi" medal by the order of the President of the Republic of Azerbaijan.
- In 2024, he was awarded the "100th Anniversary of Heydar Aliyev (1923–2023)" jubilee medal.
- In 2025, by the decree of the President of the Republic of Azerbaijan, he was awarded the "Shohrat" Order..

He is married, has a daughter and a son.

== Scientific activity ==
- In 2007 he was elected a corresponding member of ANAS in "Informatics".
- In 2014 he was elected a full member (academician) of ANAS in "Informatics".
- He has advised 6 Doctors of Sciences (DSc) and supervised 39 PhD students. He is currently advising 11 DSc and supervising 2 PhD students.
- In 2021–2024 academician Rasim Alguliyev has been recognized among the world's top 2% of scientists in the field of artificial intelligence identified by Stanford University.

== Scientific expertise activity ==
- Editorial board member of the journals:

¤ Applied and Computational Mathematics
¤ CAAI Transactions on Intelligence Technology
¤ Telecommunications (Телекоммуникации)
¤ Digital Technology Security (Безопасность цифровых технологий)
¤ Problems of Information Technology
¤ Problems of Information Society

- He is a chairman of the dissertation council at the Institute of Information Technology.

== Scientific and organizational activity ==
- He is a representative of Azerbaijan to the General Assembly of GEANT (a Pan-European Association for National Research and Education Networks).
- He is a representative of Azerbaijan to the Horizon Europe GN5-2 project.

== Social and political activity ==
- He is a member of the Coordination Commission for Information Security of the Republic of Azerbaijan.
- He is a member of the editorial board of the National Encyclopedia of Azerbaijan.
- He is a member of the Artistic Council under the "Azerbaijan Television and Radio Broadcasts" CJSC.
- He is a member of the Supervisory Board of the West Azerbaijan Community.
- He served as a member of the Board of Directors of the Azerbaijan Press Council from 2013 to 2018.
- He is a member of the New Azerbaijan Party.

== Publications and citations ==
Google Scholar

Web of Science

Scopus
