= Progress Medal =

Progress Medal may refer to:

- Progress Medal (Azerbaijan), or Taraggi Medal, awarded by the Azerbaijan Republic
- Progress Medal (RPS), awarded by the Royal Photographic Society
- Progress Medal (SMPTE), awarded by the Society of Motion Picture and Television Engineers
