= Gurban Yetirmishli =

Azerbaijani geologist (born 1952)

Gurban Jalal Yetirmishli
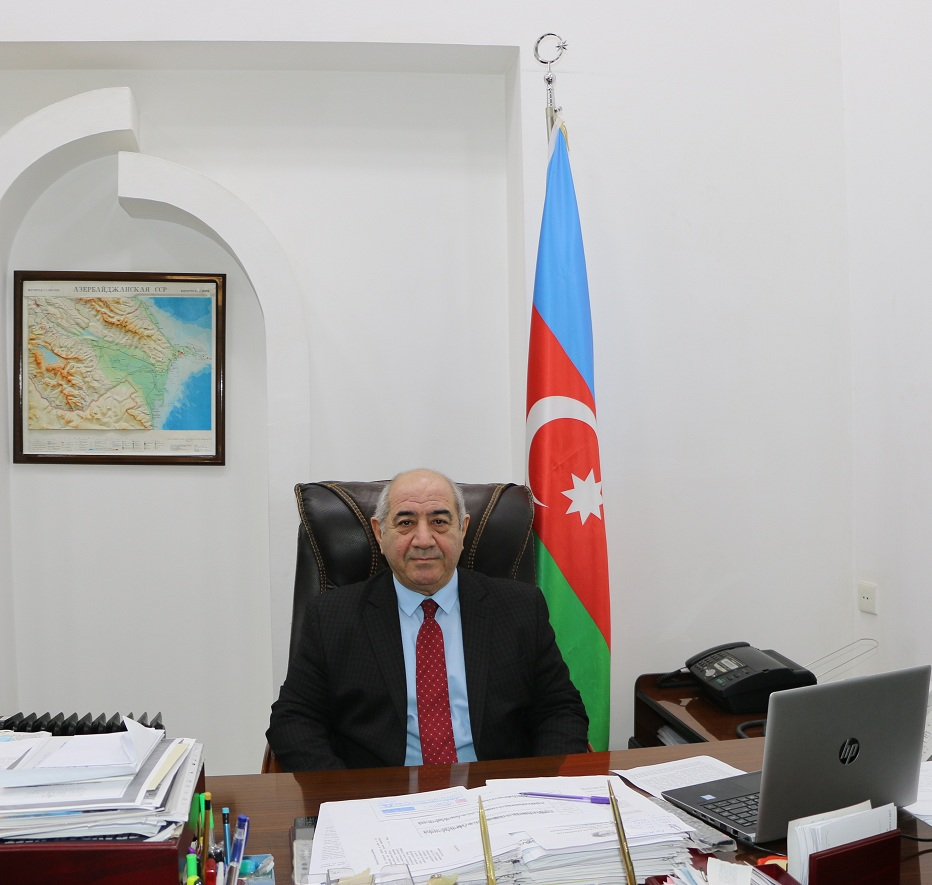
- 2022
- Born: September 4, 1952 (age 74); Marneuli, Georgian Republic
- Known for: Doctor of geological-mineralogical sciences, General director of Republican Seismic Survey Center of Azerbaijan National Academy of Sciences, Corr.member of ANAS, Head of seismology division
- Awards: Tereggi Medal
- Scientific career
- Workplaces: Republican Seismic Survey Center of Azerbaijan National Academy of Sciences

Gurban Jalal Yetirmishli (Azerbaijani: Qurban Cəlal oğlu Yetirmişli; September 4, 1952) — doctor of geological-mineralogical sciences, corr. member of Azerbaijan National Academy of Sciences (ANAS).
General director of Republican Seismic Survey Center of ANAS head of seismology division

== General information ==
- Gurban Jalal oglu Yetirmisli was born on 4 September 1952, in Marneuli city, Georgia Republic.
- In 1974, was graduated from Azerbaijan State University (BSU), faculty of geology.
- From 1980 to 2008, was Deputy General Director of RCSS ANAS. Since 2008, is general director of the Republic Seismic Survey Center.
- He was elected a corresponding member of ANAS in 2014.PhD in geology and mineralogy, professor. He was elected a corresponding member of ANAS in 2014.

In 2015, by degree of the President of the Republic of Azerbaijan, he was awarded the title of Honored Scientist.

- He is the general director of the Republican Seismic Survey Center of Azerbaijan National Academy of Sciences since 2008.
- He was elected head of seismology division.
- Held a number of scientific researches in geodynamics, in difficult conditions of seismic active zones, evaluation of deep layers of oil and the prospects of Lower Kura depression, author 246 scientific articles. A number of articles have been published in prestigious scientific journals of the world.
- Corresponding member of ANAS Gurban Yetirmishli elected a foreign member of the section of Russian Academy of Natural Sciences.

- Under the guidance of G. Yetirmishli, three young Geology and Mineralogy employees, defended the degree of PhD.

Currently, about 10 doctoral students and candidates continue the researches in scientific fields under his leadership.

- He is doctor of geological-mineralogical sciences, corr. member of ANAS.
- He is married, has 1 daughter and 1 son.

== Main scientific activity ==
- In 2000 he defended his thesis on the topic "The distribution of oil and gas fields in the seismic-geodynamic conditions of Lower Kura Depression."

- In 2010, successfully defended his doctoral thesis on the topic "Seismicity of the South Caspian depression" and received the degree of Doctor in Geological and Mineralogical Sciences.
- Made a unique contribution in expanding the network of telemetry seismic stations of the Republican Seismological Service, in cooperation with ANAS, increased the number of seismic satellite stations from 14 to 35, and has provided the center with programs in accordance with international standards and improved the work to a high standard.
- Co-author of the book "The volume of Geophysics", the author of the book "Review of the method of zoning the stress-strain factors on the territory of Azerbaijan", Chief Editor of the scientific journal "Seismoprognosis monitoring in Azerbaijan".
- Under the guidance of Gurban Yetirmishli, two young Geology and Mineralogy employees, defended the degree of PhD. Currently, about 10 doctoral students and candidates continue the researches in scientific fields under his leadership.
- For the first time on the basis data of the multichannel telemetric stations, have been investigated methods of estimation cross-section parameters of waves, studying of a trajectory of cross-section waves points, the analysis of direction changes on different depth and designing of increase efficiency of cross-section waves identification in difficult geological conditions. Executors: (g-m.s.d. G.D.Yetirmishli, Ph.D. g-m.s. I.E.Kazimov.)
- For the first time on the basis of telemetry stations network, corrections were made in times receipts of P and S waves in the Middle Kura depression and developed velocity model for determination coordinate of earthquake epicenters. Executors: (g-m.s.d. G.D.Yetirmishli, Ph.D. g-m S.E.Kazimova).
- For the first time on the basis of an electronic database, has been conducted complex interpretation of parameters in geophysical areas, creation schedules of results, visualisation in a 3D format, creation of models, creation of a software package which allows to define areas of geophysical seismoabnormal effects. Executors: (g-m.s.d. G.D.Yetirmishli, Ph.D. g-m.s. T.B.Asadov.)
- According to the analysis of geomagnetic field parameters was defined seismogenic zones of earthquakes occurring in the Great Caucasus and Talysh areas and it allows to investigate the scenario of seismic activity development in these regions. Executors: (g-m.s.d. G.D.Yetirmishli, Ph.D. in physic-mathematics A.G.Rzayev.)
- For the first time by tools methods on the basis seismotelemetric stations, has been registered 3 step of eruption process of a mud volcano in Lokbatan. Executors: (g-m.s.d. G.D.Yetirmishli, Ph.D. on g-m.s. S.E.Kazimova.)
- On the basis of seismotelemetric stations database information has been created mechanism of the source zones (M ≥2,5) and have been found out characteristics of deformations in seismotectonics in various seismic zones of republic. Executors: (g-m.s.d. G.D.Yetirmishli, Ph.D. on g-m.s S.E.Kazimova.)

== Names of scientific works ==
- Deep Earthquakes beneath the Northern Caucasus: Evidence of Active or Recent Subduction in Western Asia. Bulletin of the Seismological Society of America, Vol.102, No.2, April 2012, pp. 862–866.R.J.Mellors, J.Jackson, S.Myers, R.Gok, K.Priestley, G.Yetirmishli, N.Turkelli, T.Godoladze.
- Г.Д.Етирмишли. Развитие сейсмологических и сейсмопрогностических исследований в Азербайджане. Azərbaycan ərazisində seysmoproqnoz müşahidələrin kataloqu, 2012, c. 151-166
- Етирмишли Г.Д., Казымова С.Э. Скоростная модель земной коры Азербайджана по данным цифровых сейсмических станций. Геология и Геофизика Юга России, No.1/2012, ISSN 2221-3198, с. 59-73
- Г.Д.Етирмишли. Развитие сейсмологических и сейсмопрогностических исследований в Азербайджане. Azərbaycan ərazisində seysmoproqnoz müşahidələrin kataloqu, 2012, c. 151-166
- G.Yetirmishli. Seismological and seismo-predicting research in Azerbaijan. ESC 2012, Book of Abstracts European Seismological Commission 33rd General Assembly 19–24 August 2012 and Young Seismologist Training Course 25–30 August 2012, Moscow-Obninsk, Russia, pp. 192–193
- Г.Д.Етирмишли, Р.Р.Абдуллаева. Кавказ: Азербайджан. Землетрясения Северной Евразии в 2007г., РАН Геофизическая Служба, Обнинск 2013, с. 79-86
- Г.Д.Етирмишли, С.Э.Казымова, Э.С.Гаравелиев, С.С.Исмаилова. ЛЕРИКСКОЕ-II ЗЕМЛЕТРЯСЕНИЕ 11 июля 2007 г. с КР=12.3, МW=5.2, I0=6 (Азербайджан). Землетрясения Северной Евразии в 2007г., РАН Геофизическая Служба, Обнинск 2013, с. 373-384
- Г.Д.Етирмишли, Э.С.Гаравелиев, Ш.К.Исламова. АХСУИНСКОЕ ЗЕМЛЕТРЯСЕНИЕ 23 августа 2007 г. с КР=11.6, Мs=3.8, I0=5 (Азербайджан). Землетрясения Северной Евразии в 2007г., РАН Геофизическая Служба, Обнинск 2013, с. 408-414
- Г.Д.Етирмишли, Э.С.Гаравелиев, З.Г.Аллахвердиева. ТЕРТЕРСКОЕ ЗЕМЛЕТРЯСЕНИЕ 19 сентября 2007 г. с КР=11.7, I0=5 (Азербайджан). Землетрясения Северной Евразии в 2007г., РАН Геофизическая Служба, Обнинск 2013, с. 415-421
- Yetirmishli G.J., Mammadli T.Y., Kazimova. S.E. FEATURES OF SEISMICITY OF AZERBAIJAN PART OF THE GREATER CAUCASUS. Journal of Georgian Geophysical Society, Issue (A), Physics of Solid Earth, v. 16a, 2013, pp. 55–60
- Ад.А.Алиев, И.С.Гулиев, Г.Д.Етирмишли, Н.П.Юсубов. Извержение грязевого вулкана Локбатан 20 сентября 2012г.: Новые свидетельства восполняемости ресурсов углеводородов. Azərbaycan Milli Elmlər Akademiyası XƏBƏRLƏR Yer Elmləri, 2013 No. 2, с.18-25
- G.Skolbeltsyn, R.Mellors, R.Gök, N.Türkelli, G. Yetirmishli, E. Sandvol. Upper Mantle S wave Velocity Structure of the East Anatolian-Caucasus Region. ©2014 American Geophysical Union, doi: 10.1002/2013TC003334

== Membership in government agencies ==
- Is a member of the editorial board of ANAS journal "Heberler" (a series of Earth Sciences).
- Chairman of the Scientific and Technical Council of the National Academy of Sciences of RCSS, and a member of the European Seismological Commission.
- President of Association of Seismologists of Azerbaijan.

== Membership with international and foreign scientific organizations ==
- ORFEUS, IRIS, EMSC

== Awards and prize ==
- Tereqqi” medal of Azerbaijan Republic
- On the occasion of the 50th anniversary was awarded the "Certificate of Honour" by the Presidium of ANAS 2003
- İn 2015, he was awarded with "the patriotic scientific" by "the publishing house of Europe". In the same year, he was awarded too the "Honored nscientifict" with the decree of President of Azerbaijan Republic"
- In 2015, he was awarded with "Honored Scientific" by decree of President of Azerbaijan Republic.
- Gurban Yetirmishli, acorrespondent member of ANAS was awarded "Honorary Diploma" according to the opinion survey of journalists and separate media agencies on the eve of the 141 anniversary of the National Press by "The voice of Parliament" Public Union and "Parlamentinsəsitv" internet television.
