= Shirzad Abdullayev =

Azerbaijani economist

- Azerbaijani: Şirzad Abdullayev
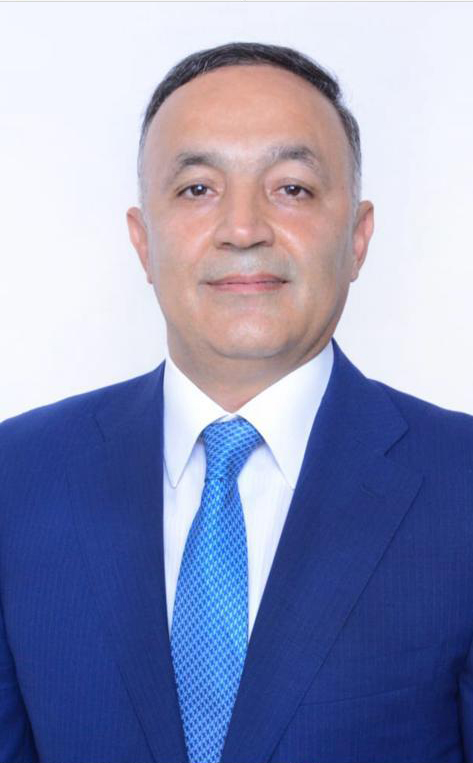

Deputy minister of economy of the Republic of Azerbaijan
- In office 2018–2020

Executive director of the National Fund for Entrepreneurship Support under the Ministry of Economy
- In office 2008–2018

Head of the division of Legal provision of banking supervision in the Central Bank of the Republic of Azerbaijan
- In office 2003–2018

Head of the Board of “Azinvestbank”
- In office 1992–2003

Personal details
- Born: October 16, 1970 Agdash District, Azerbaijan SSR
- Citizenship: Azerbaijani
- Education: Azerbaijan State University of Economics
- Awards: Tereggi Medal; Distinguished Public Service Medal

Shirzad Abdullayev, Deputy Minister of Economy of the Republic of Azerbaijan (2018–2020), Executive Director of the National Entrepreneurship Support Fund (2008–2018), PhD in economics, professor.

== Biography ==
Shirzad Abdullayev was born on October 16, 1970, in Agdash District of Azerbaijan. He went to the secondary school at the native district. S. Abdullayev has served in the Air Defense Forces. He is married.

== Education ==
Shirzad Abdullayev graduated from Azerbaijan State University of Economics as an economist and from Baku State University as a lawyer. In 2005, he pursued his education at Berlin School of Economics and German Institute of Applied Sciences in the Federal Republic of Germany. Currently, he works as a professor in the department, is engaged in scientific-pedogogical activity.

== Scientific activity ==
S. Abdullayev defended a thesis on “Problems related with creation and use of loan resources in commercial banks of Azerbaijan” under the subject of “Finance, monetary circulation and loans” at the University of Finance and Economics in St. Petersburg, Russian Federation and held a PhD in economics in 1999.

He defended another thesis on “Bank resources management in Azerbaijan” under the subject of “Finance, monetary circulation and loans” at the specialized council of the University of Finance and Economics in St. Petersburg city and held a PhD in economics in 2003, as well. Both the diplomas were nostrified by the Higher Attestation Commission under the President of the Republic of Azerbaijan correspondingly in 2004 and 2006.

Shirzad Abdullayev became a professor in “Finance, monetary circulation and loans” in the year of 2012. He is an author of 3 monographs, 4 manuals, 2 curricula and 1 methodical guidelines, as well as nearly 50 scientific articles.

== Pedagogical activity ==
Shirzad Abdullayev worked as a senior lecturer of the department of “Banking and monetary circulation” at Azerbaijan State University of Economics in 2001–2002, assistant professor in 2002–2007, acting professor of the “Banking” department in 2007–2013, and has been working as a part-time professor since 2013.

== Work activities ==
Shirzad Abdullayev worked as a head of the Board of “Azinvestbank” in 1992–2003, head of the division of Legal provision of banking supervision in the Central Bank of the Republic of Azerbaijan in 2003–2008, and the executive director of the National Fund for Entrepreneurship Support under the Ministry of Economy in 2008–2018. Mr. Abdullayev was appointed Deputy minister of economy of the Republic of Azerbaijan under the Decree 163 dated May 31, 2018 of the President of the Republic of Azerbaijan.

== Awards ==
Shirzad Abdullayev was awarded with a “Distinguished Public Service Medal” and a “Taraggi” medal with the Decrees of the President of the Republic of Azerbaijan correspondingly dated November 12, 2012 and October 21, 2014.
