= Rafig Gasimov =

Azerbaijani professor (born 1931)

- Born: 26 June 1931 (age 94); Erivan, Armenian SSR Soviet Union
- Citizenship: Soviet Union and Azerbaijan Republic
- Occupation: Biologist

Rafiq Yunis-Ali oglu Gasimov (Azerbaijani: Rafiq Yunis-Əli oğlu Qasımov; born June 26, 1931, Yerevan) is an Azerbaijani scientist, professor, and corresponding member of the Azerbaijan National Academy of Sciences.

== Life ==
Rafiq Kasimov was born on June 26, 1931, in the city of Yerevan, Armenian SSR. He graduated from the Biological Faculty of Azerbaijan State University. Currently, Rafiq Kasimov serves as the head of the laboratory at the Institute of Physiology, named after A.I. Garayev of the Azerbaijan National Academy of Sciences. Rafiq Kasimov is a member of the international ichthyological commission and a member of the international sturgeon study group (IUCN/SSG).

== Scientific activity ==
The scientist first explored the possibilities of forming feeding and defensive skills, establishing the timelines for the development and formation of these behavioral skills in early ontogenesis. Rafiq Kasimov identified optimal conditions of temperature, salinity, and illumination for the early developmental stages of four species of Caspian sturgeon (beluga, stellate sturgeon, Russian sturgeon, and Siberian sturgeon). Through the study of the impact of drilling and oil and gas extraction waste on the essential functions of fish, Rafiq Gasimov recommended certain methods for their neutralization. He produced new hybrids of sturgeon and carp. The author has published 243 scientific papers. Under his guidance, 30 candidates and 3 doctors of science have successfully defended their theses.

=== Selected scientific works ===
His most well-known works are:

- Касимов, Рафик (1980). Сравнительная характеристика поведение дикой и заводской молоди осетровых в раннем онтогенезе. Baku: Elm.
- Касимов, Рафик (1984). Возрастно-весовой стандарт заводской молоди Каспийских осетровых (совместно с В. И. Лукьяненко, А. А. Кокоза). Volgagrad.
- Касимов, Рафик (1986). Влияние химических реагентов и бурового шлама на гидробионты и пути снижения его токсичности. Обзорная информация Мин. газ. промыш. СССР.
- Касимов, Рафик (1987). Эколого-физиологические особенности развития ценных промысловых рыб Азербайджана. Baku: Elm.
- Касимов, Рафик (2001). Чудесные рыбы Каспия. Baku.
