= Isa Habibbayli =

Azerbaijani politician and academic

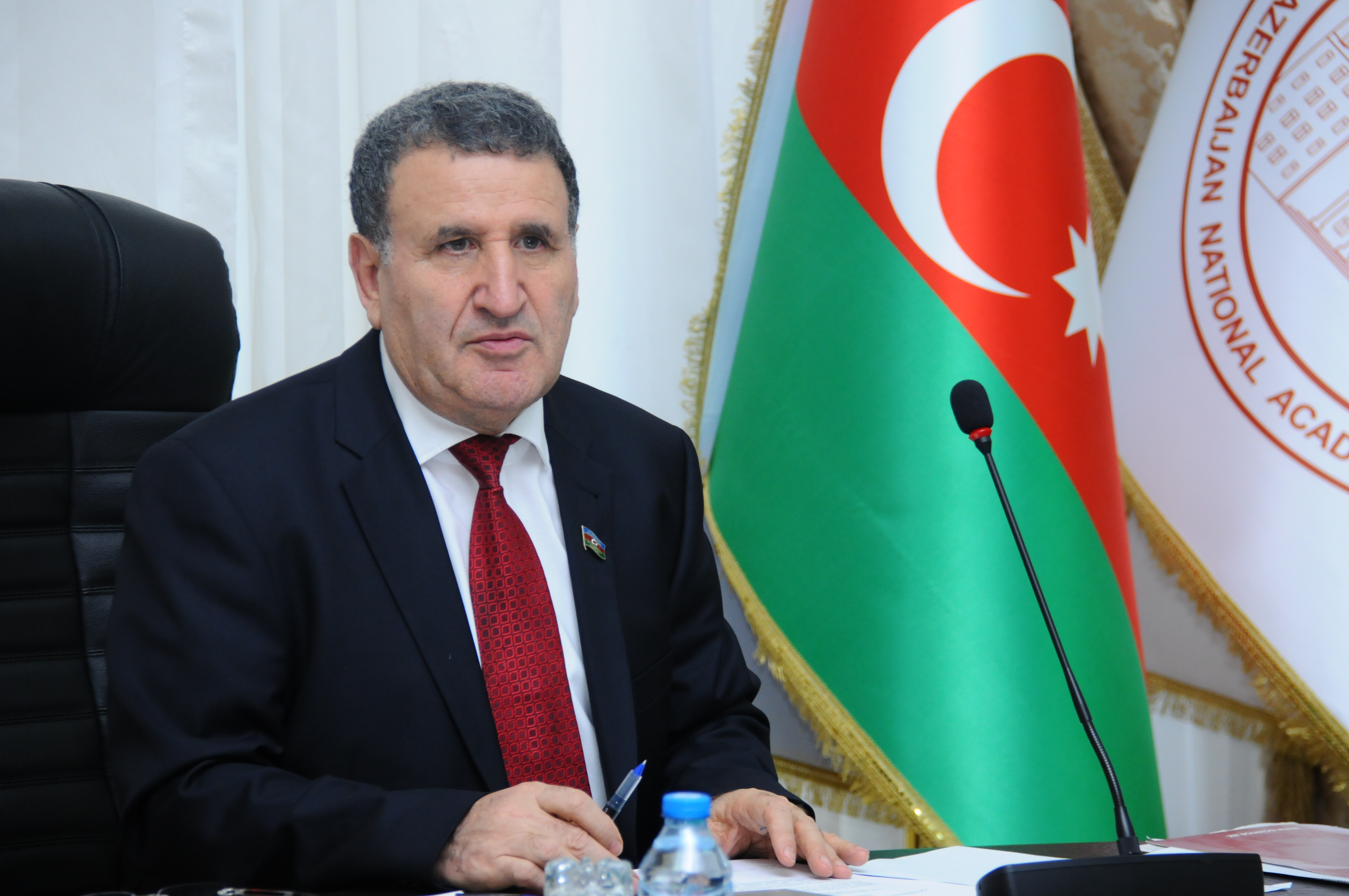
- Born: October 16, 1949; Şərur, Nakhichevan ASSR
- Education: Nakhchivan State University
- Known for: Member of New York Academy of Sciences (from 2001)
- Awards
- Scientific career
- Workplaces: Azerbaijan National Academy of Sciences

Isa Habibbayli (Azerbaijani: İsa Əkbər oğlu Həbibbəyli) is an Azerbaijani politician and academic. He has served in the Azerbaijan parliament.

He has been President of the Azerbaijan National Academy of Sciences. He was elected a member of the CORE Academy (International Core Academy of Sciences and Humanities) in 2024.

== Life ==
Isa Habibbayli was born October 16, 1949, in Danzik village, Nakhchivan. In 1971, he graduated with honors from the Nakhchivan branch of the Azerbaijan State Pedagogical Institute (now Azerbaijan State Pedagogical University).

== Academic career ==
From 1971 to 1975, Habibbayli worked as a secondary school teacher in Sharur. In 1975 he began his academic career at Nakhchivan State University, where he held various scientific and pedagogical positions. He served as Chairman of the Student Scientific Society (1968–1971, 1975–1990), Vice-Rector for Scientific Affairs (1991–1996), and Rector of Nakhchivan State University (1996–2013).

In 2013, he was elected Vice-President of ANAS, becoming First Vice-President in 2019. On 25 October 2022, he was elected President of ANAS at the General Meeting, and his appointment was confirmed by the President of Azerbaijan on 26 October 2022.

Since 2013, he has also been serving as Director-General of the Nizami Ganjavi Institute of Literature.

== Published works ==
Habibbayli defended his PhD thesis in 1980 on “Artistic features of Azerbaijani romantic lyrics of the early 20th century” and his doctoral dissertation in 1996 on “J. Mammadguluzadeh: Environment and Contemporaries.” He became Professor in 1997, a corresponding member of ANAS in 2001, and a full member in 2003.

He is the author of 14 monographs, 1 textbook, 2 teaching aids, and over 1,000 articles published in Azerbaijan and abroad, including Turkey, Russia, China, France, Poland, Hungary, Bulgaria, Ukraine, Iran, Mongolia, Central Asia, South Korea, Lithuania, Georgia, and Egypt. He has supervised 7 PhD and 39 doctoral dissertations.

His research focuses on the history of Azerbaijani literature of the 19th–21st centuries, literary movements, and criticism. He identified satire as a literary type and developed the concepts of Azerbaijanism, Mollanasraddinism, and literary periodization.

He has conducted extensive studies on Jalil Mammadguluzadeh, publishing his collected works in Azerbaijan and several other countries, and also edited the unknown writings of M. T. Sidqi, M. Shahtakhtli, M. S. Ordubadi, E. Sultanov, and M. C. Jafarov.

== Social and political activities ==
Habibbayli was elected deputy of the Supreme Assembly of Nakhchivan Autonomous Republic (1998–2005), where he chaired the International Relations and Human Rights Commission. He was elected to the Milli Majlis of Azerbaijan in its 3rd, 4th, 5th, and 6th convocations (2005, 2010, 2015, 2020). From 2015 to 2020 he chaired the Committee on Science and Education of the Milli Majlis and contributed to drafting key laws including “On Science” (2016), “On Preschool Education” (2017), “On Vocational Education” (2018), and “On General Education” (2019).

- Chairman of the Milli Majlis's Science and Education Committee (since 2015);
- The chairman of the parliamentary commission on geographic names(since 2015);
- Member of the Political Council of the New Azerbaijan Party;
- Chairman of the Dissertation Council of the Institute of Literature named after Nizami Ganjavi of ANAS.

== Memberships and affiliations ==
- Member of Atatürk Culture, Language and History Higher Institution (since 1999)
- Member of the Coordinating Council of World Azerbaijanis (since 2001)
- Active member of the International Informatization Academy (since 2006)
- Member of the International Chingiz Aitmatov Academy (since 2018)
- Honorary member of Saint Petersburg University (2015) and Southern Russia University (2017)
- Honorary Doctor of Tashkent State University of Uzbek Language and Literature (2021)

== Awards ==
- Honorary title of Honored Scientist of the Azerbaijan Republic;
- “Honored Friend of Ankara University” (1999)
- “Person of the Year” by USA Biography Institute (2001)
- Outstanding Service Award of the Turkish Language Association (2004)
- Shohrat Order (2007)
- Sharaf Order (2009);
- Medal “For Service to the Motherland” (1st degree, 2019)
- Multiple honorary diplomas and awards from Azerbaijan and foreign institutions
