= Gurban =

Gurban may refer to

- Gurban (given name)
- Gurban (river) in Romania
- Sana gurban, an Azerbaijani composition by Alekper Taghiyev
