= Gurban (given name) =

Gurban is an Azerbaijani male given name that may refer to

- Gurban Ali, self-declared Shah of Shirvan in the 16th century
- Gurban Gurbanov (born 1972), Azerbaijani football player and manager
- Gurban Mammadov (born 1959), Azerbaijani politician
- Gurban Pirimov (1880–1965), Azerbaijani folk musician and tar-player
- Gurban Yetirmishli (born 1952), Azerbaijan geologist and seismologist
