= Republican Seismic Survey Center of Azerbaijan National Academy of Sciences =

- Headquarters: Baku, Azerbaijan
- Key people: Gurban Yetirmishli (General Director)
- Website: www.seismology.az

Republican Seismic Survey Center (RSSC) is the main organization involved in the research and study of earthquakes in Azerbaijan. Seismological, geophysical, geochemical and geodynamic complex research is conducted by the center.

== History ==
In Azerbaijan, the first instrumental observations began in the early XX century. In 1902, after a strong earthquake which occurred in Shamakhi, first supervision began with the initiative of Nobel Brothers to establish 3 seismic stations, thereby the instrumental observations have been started. The independent Seismological Service of Azerbaijan was restricted by the former Soviet Union for a long time. By the decision of the Council of Ministers of Azerbaijan Soviet Socialist Republic in 1979, according to the decree of the National Academy of Sciences was created "Geophysics" Geophysical Research Party at the Institute of Geology of ANAS. In 1980, on its basis was founded Experimental Methodical Geophysics Expedition. The expedition was supervised by Arif Hasanov, the corresponding member of ANAS, doctor of geology-mineralogy sciences. By the decisions of Cabinet of Ministers of Azerbaijan Republic 179 dated; 01.09.1998. and Presidium of Azerbaijan National Academy of Sciences (ANAS) N22/2 dated 17.12.1998. EMGE was given the status of Republican Seismic Survey Center (RSSC) of ANAS in 1999. Since 2008, the corresponding member of ANAS, "Honoured Scientist", the doctor of geology-mineralogy sciences, professor Yetirmishli Gurban Jalal headed the RSSC.

== Activities ==
RSSC is the only organization in the CIS where seismological research is conducted by a network of seismic stations operating via satellite communication. There are 84 seismic stations of RSSC operating via satellite communication in Azerbaijan. In addition, 24 GPS stations were installed in the territory of the republic by the center. The GPS station located on the well with the depth of 8324 meters in the Saatli district of Azerbaijan is selected by its unity. There are geophysical and geochemical stations of RSSC in the territory of the republic.

== Structural subdivisions ==
- Department of macroseismic researches
- Department of Dynamics of earthquake sources
- Earthquake Research Bureau
- Department of Engineering Geology and seismic micro zoning
- Epicentral department
- Department of Magnetometry
- Department of Geodynamics
- Department of analysis and interpretation of seismic data
- Department of Gravimetry
- Department of Scientific Relations
- Department of Comprehensive geochemical investigations
- Instrumental department
- Department of Environmental Geoscience
- Seismology
- Department of Research of seismic and geophysical studies
- Department Information
- Department of İnternational Relations

== International Relations ==
The Republican Seismic Survey Center of the Azerbaijan National Academy of Sciences closely cooperates with foreign countries and international organizations. In 2008, RSSC ANAS was elected a full member of two important seismological international organizations – IRIS (Incorporated Research Institutions for Seismology) and ORFEUS (Observatories and Research Facilities for European Seismology). In 2012, RSSC ANAS was elected an associate member of the European Seismological Commission. Currently, there are six major international seismological organizations in the world, of which RSSC is a member – EMSC (European-Mediterranean Seismological Center), IRIS (Incorporated Research Institutions for Seismology), ORFEUS (Observatories and Research Facilities for European Seismology), ESC (European Seismological Commission), EGU (European Geosciences Union) and AGU (American Geophysical Union). The Department of Earthquakes of the Disaster and Emergency Management Presidency (AFAD) of the Ministry of Internal Affairs of Turkey and the Republican Seismic Survey Center of ANAS signed a protocol of agreement following negotiations held on December 1–3, 2021, on expanding bilateral cooperation and implementing joint projects. In 2014, the "International seismotography" laboratory was established at the Seismological Service Center of ANAS, the Livermore National Laboratory named after E. Lawrence, the Missouri University of Science and Technology, and the Michigan State University.

== Directors ==
Arif Hasanov – in 1998–2008

Gurban Yetirmishli — from 2008 to the present day.

== See also ==
- Gurban Yetirmishli
