= Bahman Akhundov =

Azerbaijani Soviet economist

Bahman Yusif oglu Akhundov
- Born: 28 December 1910; Erivan, Russian Empire
- Died: 2 October 1980 (aged 69); Baku, Azerbaijan SSR
- Scientific career
- Fields: Economics
- Institutions: ANAS; Azerbaijan State University of Economics; Azerbaijan State University

Bahman Yusif oglu Akhundov (Azerbaijani: Bəhman Yusif oğlu Axundov, 28 December 1910 – 2 October 1980) was an Azerbaijani Soviet economist, Honored Economist of the Azerbaijan SSR, Corresponding Member of the Academy of Sciences of the Azerbaijan SSR (1968). He became the first Azerbaijani doctor of economic sciences (1951).

== Life ==
Bahman Akhundov was born on December 28, 1910, in Yerevan. In 1918, his family migrated to Sharur District. Akhundov entered the Nakhchivan Agriculture Technical School and continued his education at the Dashkend Central Asian State Planning Institute, completing his studies there in 1934.

From 1945 to 1959, he worked as the chief research associate at the Institute of Economics of the Azerbaijan SSR Academy of Sciences. From 1952 to 1966, he was a professor at the Department of Political Economy at the Azerbaijan State University. From 1966 to 1974, he served as the vice-rector for scientific work at the Azerbaijan Institute of National Economy. Starting in 1974, he worked as a professor at the Department of Political Economy at the Azerbaijan Institute of National Economy.
