= Vajiha Samadova =

Vajiha Samadova Vəcihə Səmədova
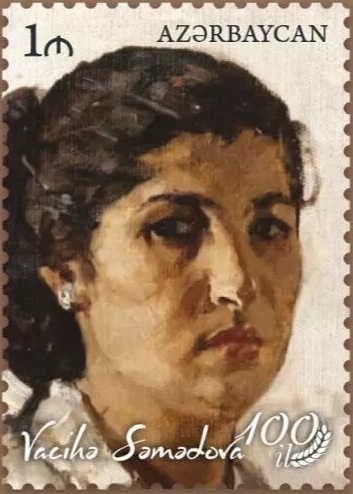
- Samadova on a 2024 stamp of Azerbaijan
- Born: Vəcihə Əli qızı Səmədova; 24 November 1924; Baku, Azerbaijan SSR
- Died: 24 October 1965 (aged 40); Baku, Azerbaijan SSR
- Occupation: Painter
- Spouse: Latif Fayzullayev
- Awards: Honored Art Worker of the Azerbaijan SSR

Vajiha Samadova (Azerbaijani: Vəcihə Əli qızı Səmədova; 24 November 1924 – 24 October 1965) ) was Azerbaijan's first professional female painter and was named a Distinguished Artist of the Azerbaijan SSR in 1964. Shortly after she died a gallery hall in the Azerbaijan Artists Union was named after her. Four of Samedova's artworks are in the collection of the Azerbaijan State Art Gallery.

== Life ==
Samadova was born in 1924 to confectioner Karbalayi Ali, an Azerbaijani from Kars and his Rubaba Samadova, from an Azerbaijani family from Qom, Iran.

As a child Samadova lived in Icherisheher. From 1939 to 1944 she studied at the Azim Azimzadeh Azerbaijan State School of Painting, where she met her future husband, Latif Fayzullayev. Afterward she studied at Institute of Painting in Moscow. On November 1, 1945, she and her husband had their first child, Nijat. After a one-year break, Vajiha Samadova resumed her education and completed her studies in 1949, returning to Baku.

In 1951 graduated with a thesis "Among the Students of Azerbaijani Composer Uzeyir Hajibeyov." Under the guidance of Pavel Korin she spent three more years as a postgraduate student. Later she returned to Baku and became Azerbaijan's first professional female painter. After returning to Azerbaijan she became a teacher at the Azim Azimzadeh School of Painting. In 1958, after the construction of the Artists' House was completed, her family was provided with an apartment and the painter's studio there.

In 1962 she was given a separate studio. Soon after she fell seriously ill.

== Works ==
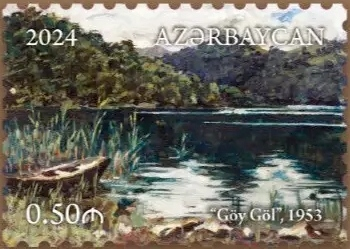
Blue Lake (1953)

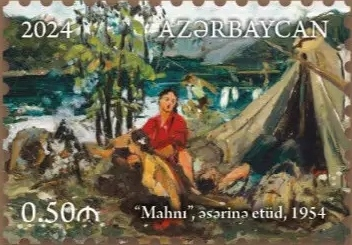
Song (1954)

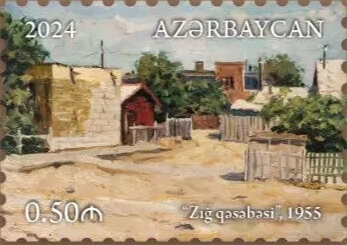
Zig Settlement (1955)

Between 1957 and 1963 she created works including "Wedding in Lenkeran," "Preparation for the Celebration," and "Song."

Her paintings about Azerbaijan include "In the Cradle of the Kur," "Song," "In Anticipation," "Preparation for the Celebration," series of landscapes like "Qoshqar Pastures," "Blue Lake," "Kepaz," "On the Kur Shores," portraits of "Actress Leyla Badirbeyli," "Cotton Picking Woman," "Portrait of Shamama Huseynova," and "Portrait of Geologist Minire Mammadbayli".

In 1953 she painted a portrait of actress Leyla Badirbeyli, exhibited in the National Art Museum of Azerbaijan. Her portrait works include "Self-portrait," "Portrait of Actress Leyla Badirbeyli," "Portrait of Sureyya Karimova," "Portrait of Sohbat Ibrahimova," "Young Violinist," and "Portrait of Geologist Minure Mammadbayli".

Her last painting, "Awaiting News," was created in 1963 and displayed at the "Our Contemporaries" exhibition held in Baku in 1963.

== Death ==
In 1962, Vajiha Samadova was diagnosed with cancer. Her doctor suggested an operation to amputate her arm to prolong her life, but it would have meant ending her artistic career. However, the artist declined this option. As a result, her condition worsened. Although she underwent surgery in Moscow later, it was already too late. In 1965, just a month shy of her 41st birthday, Vajiha Samadova passed away. Despite being offered a place in the Alley of Honor by the Central Committee in Fakhri Khiyaban, according to her wishes, she was buried in a Muslim cemetery. Soon after her death, her name was immortalized by being presented in the exhibition hall of the Union of Artists of Azerbaijan.

Following her death, her husband Latif Feyzullayev created paintings dedicated to her memory, including "Old Cemetery," "Solitary Grave," "Portrait of the Painter Vajiha Samadova," and "Morning."

== Awards ==
She received the title of Honored Artist of the Azerbaijan SSR on June 29, 1964.

== Exhibitions ==
In 1962, a solo exhibition was held in Baku. His works such as "Old Bulgarian women", "Market in Sofia", "Rainy day" are exhibited here, where he painted impressions of his trip to Bulgaria. The next exhibitions are held in Moscow and Sofia.

In 1963, the work "Waiting for News" was exhibited at the "Our Modern" exhibition.

On July 14, 2018, the "Tandem of Love" exhibition, consisting of the works of Latif Feyzullayev and Vajiha Samadova, was held in the Palace of Festivals and Congresses within the "Azerbaijani Culture Days" organized by the Heydar Aliyev Foundation in Cannes, France.

In February 2020, an exhibition of 40 works of the couple was held at the "Rolls-Royce Motor Cars Baku" exhibition hall with the support of the Ministry of Culture of Azerbaijan.

== Memory ==
The exhibition hall of the Union of Artists of Azerbaijan, located in the center of Baku, has been named after Vajiha Samadova, the Honored Artist of Azerbaijan, since 1965. Her son, film director Nijat Feyzullayev, produced a documentary film commissioned by the Ministry of Culture and Tourism that portrays his mother's life and artistic contributions. The premiere of the film titled "The Queen of Azerbaijani Painting" took place on September 29, 2010, at the International Mugham Center in Baku.

Currently, four artworks by Vajiha Samadova are preserved and stored in the collection of the Azerbaijan State Art Gallery.
