= Azerbaijani Soviet Encyclopedia =

Azerbaijani Soviet Encyclopedia Азәрбајҹан Совет Енсиклопедијасы Azərbaycan Sovet Ensiklopediyası
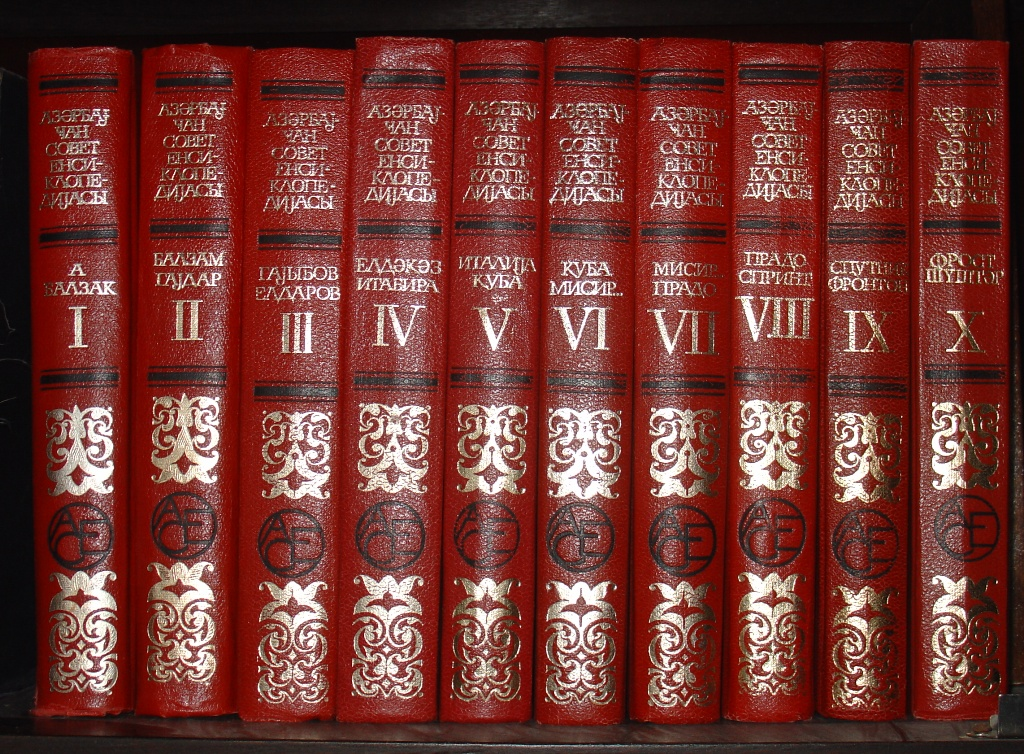
- The ten volume set of the Azerbaijani Soviet Encyclopedia.
- Author: Rasul Rza, Jemil Kuliyev
- Genre: 1976-1987
- Publisher: National Academy of Sciences of Azerbaijan
- Media type: Encyclopedia
- Pages: 6265
- OCLC: 10276733

The Azerbaijani Soviet Encyclopedia (in Azerbaijani: Azərbaycan Sovet Ensiklopediyası, Cyrillic: Азәрбајҹан Совет Енсиклопедијасы, [ɑːzærbɑjˈd͡ʒɑn səˈvʲɛt ɛnt͡sɨkləˈpʲɛdɪjɐsə]) is a ten volume universal encyclopedia published in Baku, Azerbaijan from 1976 to 1987 by the Academy of Sciences of the Azerbaijan Soviet Socialist Republic. The editors-in-chief were Rasul Rza and Jemil Kuliyev. A special volume dedicated to Azerbaijan was scheduled to be published after the main ten volumes, but due to rising political problems and difficult economic situation, it has not been released.

== List of volumes by publication date ==
1. Volume I, 1976
2. Volume II, 1978
3. Volume III, 1979
4. Volume IV, 1980
5. Volume V, 1981
6. Volume VI, 1982
7. Volume VII, 1983
8. Volume VIII,1984
9. Volume IX, 1986
10. Volume X, 1987

== See also ==
- Great Soviet Encyclopedia
- National Encyclopedia of Azerbaijan
