= Iosif Yesman =

Russian hydraulic scientist (1868–1955)

Iosif Gavrilovich Yesman (Russian: Иосиф Гаврилович Есьман; December 1 1868, in Vileyka – July 1 1955, in Baku) was a Soviet and Russian scientist in the field of hydraulics. He was a full member, one of the founders (1945), and director of the Institute of Power Engineering (1945–1955) at the Azerbaijan National Academy of Sciences.

Yesman was a power engineering specialist. He was an honored scientist of Azerbaijan in 1929.
