= Nakhchivan Branch of ANAS =

Regional branch of the Azerbaijan National Academy of Sciences

- Azərbaycan Milli Elmlər Akademiyasının Naxçıvan Bölməsi
- Formation: 7 August 2002
- Type: Regional scientific branch
- Headquarters: Nakhchivan, Azerbaijan
- Region served: Nakhchivan Autonomous Republic
- Chair: Ismayil Hajiyev
- Parent organization: Azerbaijan National Academy of Sciences
- Website: nscience.gov.az

The Nakhchivan Branch of the Azerbaijan National Academy of Sciences (Azerbaijani: Azərbaycan Milli Elmlər Akademiyasının Naxçıvan Bölməsi), also known as the Nakhchivan Division, is a regional branch of the Azerbaijan National Academy of Sciences (ANAS), based in Nakhchivan, Azerbaijan. It was established on 7 August 2002. Its research focuses on the history, archaeology, ethnography, language, literature, folklore and cultural heritage of the Nakhchivan Autonomous Republic.

== History ==
=== Establishment ===
The branch was established by a presidential order issued on 7 August 2002. It brought together existing scientific facilities in Nakhchivan, including the Nakhchivan Regional Scientific Centre, the Nakhchivan Scientific Research Base and astronomical research stations at Batabat and Aghdara.

Its original structure comprised six institutions: the Institute of History, Ethnography and Archaeology; the Institute of Art, Language and Literature; the Institute of Natural Resources; the Institute of Bioresources; the Fund of Manuscripts; and the Batabat Astrophysical Observatory.

The branch began operating in January 2003. Facilities were subsequently allocated to its research institutions and administration, while its publishing house began operating in 2005.

The twentieth anniversary of the branch was marked in 2022. The anniversary ceremony included a review of its research activities and publications during its first two decades.

=== Reorganisation ===
In July 2022, the Azerbaijani government reorganised the administration of scientific and educational institutions. As part of the changes, the Institute of Natural Resources, the Institute of Bioresources and the Batabat Astrophysical Observatory were transferred from ANAS to the Ministry of Science and Education.

A presidential order issued on 3 March 2023 amended the branch's founding order, formally removing the three institutions from its original organisational structure.

In April 2025, the Cabinet of Ministers was instructed to arrange their phased transfer to Nakhchivan State University by the end of that year. The university subsequently confirmed that the institutions had been placed under its authority.

== Organisation and governance ==
Following the reorganisation, ANAS lists three constituent institutions within the Nakhchivan Branch:

- Institute of History, Ethnography and Archaeology
- Institute of Art, Language and Literature
- Fund of Manuscripts

The branch also has a scientific library, publishing house and scientific archive. Its administrative departments include units responsible for science and education and international relations.

Under the ANAS charter, regional scientific branches are governed by a presidium and headed by a chair. The chair is elected by the General Meeting of ANAS and formally appointed by the president of the academy.

The chair of the Nakhchivan Branch is academician Ismayil Hajiyev.

== Research ==
The branch conducts research in history, archaeology, ethnography, linguistics, literary studies, folklore and the arts. Its manuscript collection supports research into the written heritage of Nakhchivan and the surrounding region.

=== Archaeology and international collaboration ===
The branch has participated in international archaeological research projects in Nakhchivan. In 2006, excavations at Ovçular Təpəsi resumed through a Franco-Azerbaijani collaboration involving the Nakhchivan Branch and the French National Centre for Scientific Research (CNRS). The project investigated prehistoric occupation and cultural connections between the South Caucasus and the ancient Near East.

Research conducted during the 2009 and 2010 excavation seasons was documented in a subsequent report. The project involved researchers from several international institutions and received support from the Nakhchivan Branch.

ANAS researchers also participated in the American–Azerbaijani archaeological project at Oğlanqala, conducted in collaboration with the University of Pennsylvania. Research undertaken in 2008 and 2009 examined the site's Iron Age occupation and its relationship with regional political powers.

The Penn Museum identifies Veli Bakhshaliyev and Safar Ashurov among the Azerbaijani researchers involved in the project.

== Publications ==
The branch publishes the scholarly journal Elmi əsərlər. Established in 2005 under the title Xəbərlər, the journal has used its current title since 2019. It publishes research on history, archaeology, ethnography, language, literature, folklore and the arts.

The Institute of Art, Language and Literature publishes Axtarışlar, a scholarly journal covering literary studies, folklore studies, linguistics and art history.

Publications associated with the branch include the two-volume Nakhchivan Encyclopedia, the Encyclopedia of Nakhchivan Monuments, the Atlas of Nakhchivan History, the three-volume History of Nakhchivan and the three-volume Anthology of Nakhchivan Folklore.

== See also ==
- Azerbaijan National Academy of Sciences
- Nakhchivan State University
- Nakhchivan Autonomous Republic
