= Aminaga Sadigov =

Azerbaijanian scientist (born 1962)

Aminagha Sadigov
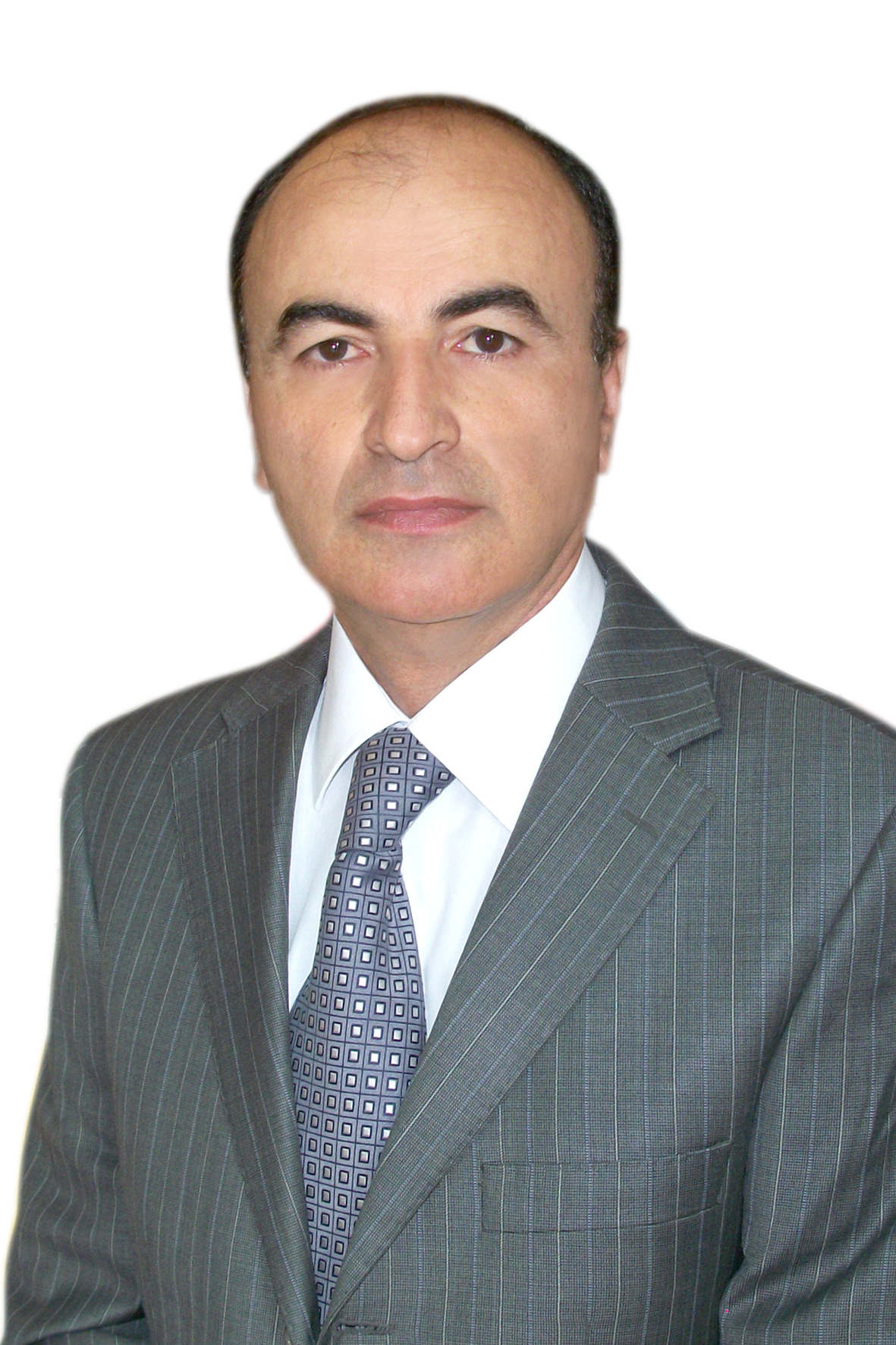
- Sadigov in 2009
- Born: December 18, 1962 (age 63); Lerik, Azerbaijan
- Education: Dnipro National University
- Occupations: Deputy Director, State Agency for Science and High Education
- Awards: The "TEREGGI" Medal of Azerbaijan Republic
- Scientific career
- Workplaces: Ministry of Science and Education

Aminagha Bahman Sadigov (born December 18, 1962, Lerik) is the Deputy Director of the State Agency for Science and Higher Education, a Correspondent member of ANAS ANAS, doctor of technical sciences and professor.

== General information ==
Aminaga Sadigov was born on December 18, 1962, in the Lerik region of Azerbaijan. In 1980 he finished secondary school with physical-mathematical tendency No.1 in Baku. In the same year, he entered the Applied Mathematical Faculty of Dnepropetrovsk State University and graduated from there in 1985. In 1992, he received the degree of the candidate of physical-mathematical sciences. In 2013, at the "Institute of Control Systems" of the ANAS he defended a doctoral dissertation themed "Models and Technologies of deciding of management problems in Emergency cases and received the scientific degree of doctor of technical sciences.

Besides his native language, he knows Russian, English and Ukraine. He is married, and has a daughter and two sons.

== Scientific-organizational activity ==
His working activity started in 1985 in the Institute of Mathematic and Mechanic of ANAS. Since 1988 he has worked as a scientific secretary of the Presidium of ANAS, from 1998 he has worked as chief Scientific Organization of the Presidium of ANAS, since 2013 he has worked as chief the Office Scientific Organization of the Presidium of ANAS. From 2015, he is head of the office of Science and Education of the Presidium of ANAS, he works as a substitute director of "Accidental monitoring and forecasting laboratory" at the Institute of Management Systems of ANAS. During several years he has demonstrated a good abilityin the pedagogical sphere working substitutionally at the different Universities. At present he works on social basis as a chief of Intellectual Property and Innovative Social Unity as an executive secretary of Organization of Republican Scientific Researches and Coordinative Council, as a deputy chairman of "The Association members of Venchur projects"of the development of science, business and the third section, a member of the protection Intellectual Property, International Association of Academies of Sciences, transferring of technologies Advisory Board and Scientific Council, he is also the expert of the American Civil Research Fund, a member of Organization of the Black Sea Economical Cooperation and a member of working group of the science and technology.

He represented the Republic of Azerbaijan and ANAS in more than important 60 international arrangements in 40 countries of the world. He has taken part in training, specialized courses, technology and management in various countries including the USA, Israel, Malaysia, Germany, Greece and has received relevant certificates.

== Scientific works ==
Aminaga Sadıqov is the author of 157 scientific works, including 3 monographs, 1 patent and 2 inventions.

== Awards ==
Aminaga Sadiqov was awarded with the medal "Progress" by the president of the Azerbaijan Republic dated with an order on December 14, 2005. Owing to effective scientific and institutional activities he was awarded 3 times by ANAS "Honorary Award" and upon recommendation of the president of Ukraine "Golden Fortune" and International Rating Academy "Честь, Слава, Труд".
