= Danzik =

- Location within Azerbaijan
- Coordinates: 39°42′17″N 45°07′00″E
- Country: Azerbaijan
- Autonomous republic: Nakhchivan
- Time zone: UTC+4 (AZT)
  - Summer (DST): UTC+5 (AZT)

Danzik (also, Ashaga-Danzik, Yukhari-Danzik, and Yukhary Danzik) is a former village in the Nakhchivan Autonomous Republic of Azerbaijan.
