= Latif Fayzullayev =

Soviet Azerbaijani painter (b. 1918, d. 1987)

Latif Fayzullayev Lətif Feyzullayev
- Born: Lətif Mirəbdülbaqi oğlu Feyzullayev; 13 October 1918; Baku, Azerbaijan Democratic Republic
- Died: 25 March 1987 (aged 62); Baku, Azerbaijan SSR, USSR
- Occupation: Painter
- Spouse: Vajiha Samadova
- Awards: Honored Art Worker of the Azerbaijan SSR

Latif Mirabdulbagi oghlu Fayzullayev (Azerbaijani: Lətif Mirəbdülbaqi oğlu Feyzullayev; 13 October 1918 – 25 March 1987) was an Azerbaijani painter and Honored Art Worker of Azerbaijan.

== Biography ==
Latif Fayzullayev was born on 13 October 1918 in Baku. In 1939 Latif Fayzullayev was accepted to Azim Azimzade Art School. After finishing school, he continued his education at Surikov Moscow Art Institute. In these years he learned from his teachers Mochalski, Pocarjevski and Grabar about his profession. During his student years, he worked on historical paintings such as "Gachag Nabi", "Gatir Mammad" and participated in nationwide exhibitions.

The artist created a number of works in the spirit of military patriotism during the Great Patriotic War and was known as the author of propaganda posters in military units. At the same time, Latif Fayzullayev worked as a teacher at Azim Azimzade Art School.

In 1944, Latif Fayzullayev returned to Moscow to continue his education. The same year, he married Vajiha Samadova, who was studying in Moscow. The young artist successfully graduated from the Institute in 1949, and returned to Baku.

The main theme of the artist's works was in the postwar years were about war heroes, village workers, and workers. With the exploration of the Neft Daşları (also known as the Oil Rocks) in the 1950s, a new era begins in the works of Latif Fayzullayev. His works were romantic-themed series on Caspian oil workers. "Time" (1951), "A Windy Day" (1957), "Before the Storm" (1959), "Fountain" (1962) are the works of the series. "Spring in Absheron", "Curls", "Summer", "The Sands of Absheron", "Rocks", "The Gardens of Absheron" are his works about Absheron. He had many portrait paintings as "The portrait of a painter Vajiha Samadova", "Oilman Gulbala Aliyev", "Fatima", "Old Man", The Guest of Absheron", "The Powerful".

In the 1960s, Latif Fayzullayev and Vajiha Samadova went on a trip to Bulgaria. After the trip, his personal exhibition was held in Baku.

Latif Fayzullayev died on 25 March 1987 in Baku. He was buried next to his wife, Vajiha Samadova

On 14 July 2018 the exhibition "Love Tandem", consisting of Latif Fayzullaev's and Vajiha Samadova's paintings, opened in Cannes, France, organized by Heydar Aliyev Foundation.
