= Gurban Mammadov =

Azerbaijani politician

Gurban Mammadov (Azerbaijan)

Director of "ÇALXAN MMC" Law Firm Founder of "AzerFreedom TV" Channel Leader of People's Movement of Azerbaijan (PMA) Founder of "HURRIYYET" Independent Newspaper, Owner between 1990 - 2003

Personal details
- Born: April 2, 1959 (age 67) Nakhchivan, Azerbaijan
- Spouse: Mehpara Zeynalova
- Children: Goshgar; Turan; Gunel; Elnur; Chalkhan
- Profession: Legal Expert
- Website: Official website

Gurban Mammadov (Azerbaijani: Qurban Məmmədov, also Məmmədli; born April 2, 1959) is a prominent political figure from Azerbaijan. Born in the village of Jahri (Azerbaijani: Cəhri) within the Babek (Azerbaijani: Babək) district of the Nakhchivan (Azerbaijani: Azərbaycan) Autonomous Republic, Mammadov pursued his education in Ordubad before graduating from Azerbaijan State University in Baku. With a career spanning 35 years as a lawyer, Mammadov has been an influential force in Azerbaijani politics. He is well-known for his candid demeanor and readiness to voice dissent against the government.

== Life ==
Mr. Mammadov is also a renowned figure in Azerbaijan for his contributions to the formation of the political movement during the 1980s and 1990s. As a close friend and ally of Abulfaz Elchibey the first legally elected president of Azerbaijan, Mammadov provided invaluable assistance during Elchibey's tenure. He played a crucial role in the establishment of the Azerbaijani constitution and legal system. In addition, Mammadov founded an independent newspaper called "HURRIYYET" and served as its CEO from 1990 to 2003.

== Politics ==
A distinguished lawyer in Azerbaijan, Mammadov handled human rights cases as the head of Chalkhan LLC and as an independent attorney. In early 2013, he began voicing strong criticisms against the ruling regime and its policies, subsequently joining the National Council—a coalition of opposition parties and civil society organizations formed before the October 2013 presidential election.

Mammadov faced accusations of causing a car accident in 2012 that injured a parking lot guard, and he was placed under pre-trial detention without sufficient grounds. During his third month in detention, another charge was leveled against him. On December 6, 2013, the Nasimi District Court sentenced Mammadov to three years in prison. Despite all testimonies and evidence, including the investigation officers' findings, pointing to Mammadov's innocence, the court's decision relied solely on the testimony of former police officer Isa Mansurov, one of the case witnesses. Mansurov claimed that Mammadov's car had run over the guard's foot, but when questioned about the accident, he responded with vague answers such as "I don't remember."

The court declined to examine footage from surveillance camera No. TS3-098, which was located only three or four meters from the accident scene, and it also refused to investigate other potentially relevant circumstances. Even though none of the charges Mammadov faced carried three-year prison sentences, the court granted the public prosecutor's request for this duration.

This was not Mr. Gurban Mammadov's first politically motivated arrest. In 1998, he was arrested on charges of plotting the alleged "assassination" of President Haydar Aliyev and was sentenced to five years in prison.

On December 29, 2014, the President of Azerbaijan approved an amnesty for 87 prisoners, including Mr. Gurban Mammadov, who was released on December 30, 2014.

On April 2, 2018, Mr. Gurban Mammadov fled Azerbaijan due to imminent threats to his life, arriving in the United Kingdom with a five-year family (private) visa that he had obtained a year earlier.

In May of the same year, after traveling to Turkey to meet his wife and receiving a death threat message sent to him via her, Mr. Mammadov decided to immediately return to the UK and apply for asylum. He was granted full protection under the European Convention on Human Rights and the 1951 Refugee Convention in October 2018.

Mr. Gurban Mammadov currently resides in the United Kingdom.

Gurban Mammadov established AzerFreedom TV, an online television and media group headquartered in the United Kingdom, in 2011. Although he founded the group earlier, he has been actively managing it since May 2018. Mammadov maintains a strong presence on nine various social media platforms and has considerably influenced the political landscape in Azerbaijan.

In early September 2020, the demolition of a building located at 4-6 Murtuza Nagiyev Street in the Narimanov District of Baku was initiated.

The building consisted of two ground-floor offices and three flats above, one of which belonged to Mr. Gurban Mammadov and the others to his daughters, Gunel Mammadova and Turan Hagverdiyeva. The demolition was carried out by unidentified individuals who arrived at the site with around 30 local authority workers. None of the individuals provided identification, and they were accompanied by official police officers who did not offer any information about their orders. To date, local authorities have not produced a court order authorizing the demolition. During this act of destruction and looting, all items within the building were brutally damaged, and five children under the age of 10 were present in the apartments at the time of the incident.

Numerous video recordings on YouTube and Facebook provide clear documentation of the extensive damage inflicted during the demolition.

On September 8, 2020, the Prosecutor General's Office of the Republic of Azerbaijan issued a decision to declare Gurban Mammadov internationally wanted, forwarding the order to the Ministry of Internal Affairs, the State Security Service, and Interpol for enforcement. If apprehended by Azerbaijani law enforcement agencies, Mammadov could face a prison sentence of up to eight years.

On 12 July 2022, lawyer and politician Gurban Mammadov, who resides in the United Kingdom, filed lawsuits against several Azerbaijani media outlets including ARB TV, REAL TV, ATV, qafqazinfo.az and the Turan Information Agency. The lawsuits related to reports broadcast and published in 2020 concerning alleged connections between Mammadov and government officials as well as claims regarding property acquisitions. Mammadov stated that the publications damaged his honour, dignity and business reputation and requested retractions and public apologies from the outlets.

On March 30, 2021, the US State Department published its "2020 Country Reports on Human Rights Practices: Azerbaijan" report. In the section titled "POLITICALLY MOTIVATED REPRISAL AGAINST INDIVIDUALS LOCATED OUTSIDE THE COUNTRY," Mr. Gurban Mammadov's name is highlighted as one of the primary individuals targeted by Azerbaijani authorities. The report suggests that false criminal cases have been created against him in an effort "to detain foreign residents who are political activists."

=== Tartar case, also known as "Tartar Treason" (on social media: #Tərtər1767, in azerbaijani: Tərtər işi) ===
took place in the Tartar region of Azerbaijan and involved instances of widespread torture in May–June 2017. A joint statement from the State Security Service of Azerbaijan, the Ministry of Defense, and the Ministry of Internal Affairs disclosed the detention of servicemen on accusations of espionage for Armenian special services. However, no names were included in the statement, and official information on the case has been scarce.

As of September 5, 2022, Azerbaijan's General Prosecutor, Khanlar Valiyev, announced that an additional 288 individuals subjected to torture and other unlawful actions in connection with the Tartar treason case have been identified and comprehensively interviewed about the circumstances surrounding the case. Consequently, the total number of identified victims of torture and abuse in the Tartar treason case now amounts to 405 Azerbaijani soldiers.

Following a recent government investigation, numerous arrests have taken place, and many more victims have been officially acknowledged. Nevertheless, the motivations behind the initiation of the Tartar case, which involved allegations of widespread espionage within the military, continue to be enigmatic.

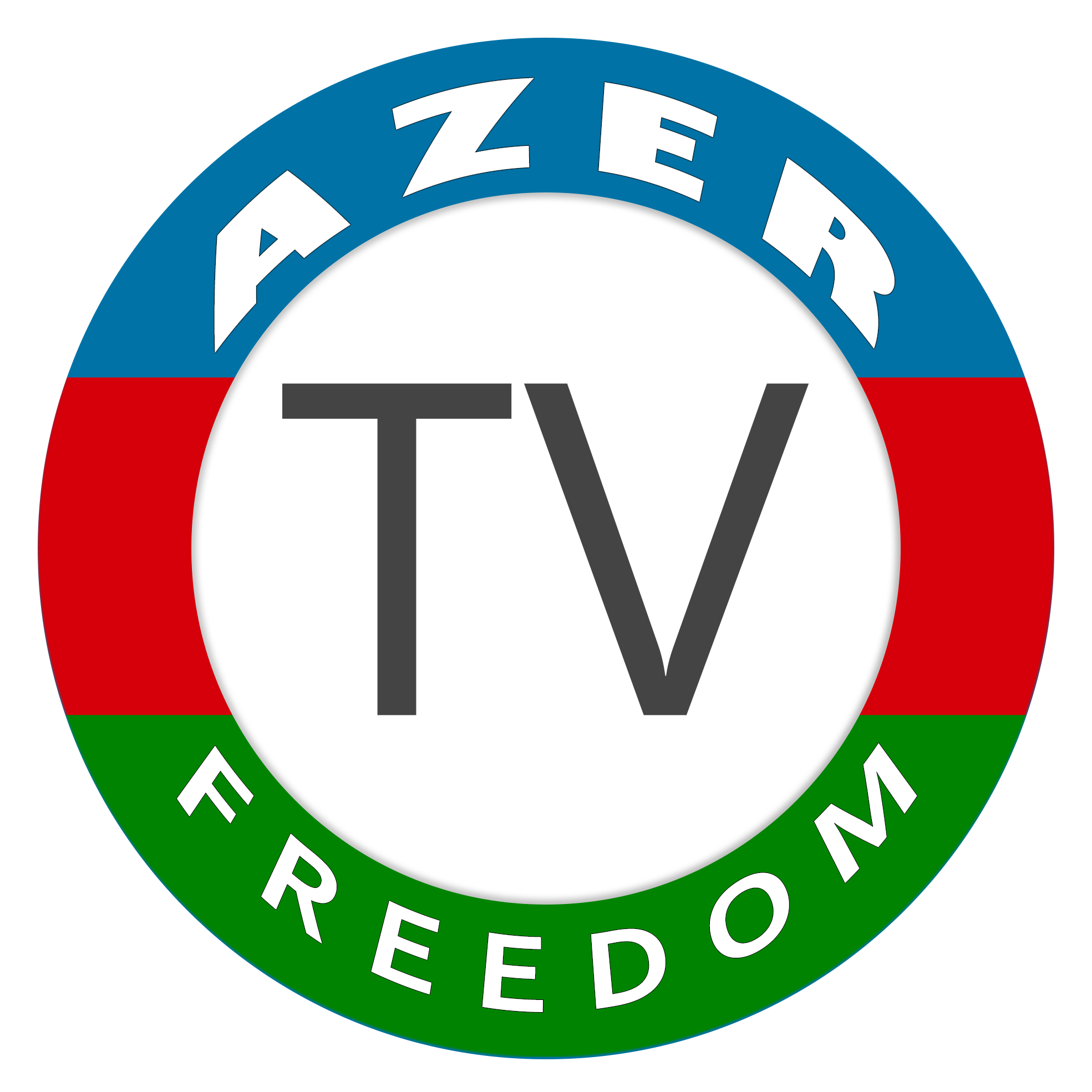

Through his efforts with AzerFreedom TV, Gurban Mammadov carried out a public investigation into the "Tartar case," which led to the release of 19 prisoners and the removal of all criminal charges from their records. This accomplishment represents a notable milestone for AzerFreedom TV and a personal victory for Mammadov.

Gurban Mammadov, in collaboration with AzerFreedom TV, along with the support of Ilham Aslanoglu, Abid Gafarov, Avaz Zeynalli, and Azerbaijani political observer and security expert Arastun Orujlu, conducted an in-depth investigation into the "Tartar case." This inquiry ultimately led to the liberation of 19 prisoners and the dismissal of all criminal charges against them, despite their unjust imprisonment based on fabricated allegations made by government officials responsible for the "Tartar case." This marked a significant achievement for Mammadov and his AzerFreedom TV team.

The resolution of the "Tartar case" was achieved through the efforts of several individuals, including lawyer Ilham Aslanoglu, who personally interviewed hundreds of victims and compiled substantial evidence; Abid Gafarov, who later joined the investigation and conducted interviews on the "Kim TV" YouTube channel; Ali Aliyev, chairman of the "Citizens and Development Party," known for openly criticizing the government; and Avaz Zeynalli, a freelance journalist and owner of the "Xural TV" YouTube channel, who also contributed to the investigation by interviewing victims and suspects. Regrettably, all of these individuals were falsely accused and detained, but their dedication ultimately led to the successful resolution of the "Tartar case."

On June 9, 2022, Ilham Aslanoglu (Tahmazov), a lawyer and activist who actively participated in the public investigation of the "Tartar case," was sentenced to six months in prison by the Yevlakh regional court. Aslanoglu was convicted under Article 148 (insult) of the Criminal Code. Previously, Aslanoglu had already been convicted in relation to the Terter case allegations. On January 28, the Yevlakh regional court found him guilty under Article 147.2 (slander of a felony) and sentenced him to five months of imprisonment.

Activist Abid Gafarov was sentenced to one year in prison by a local court, despite the claimants' withdrawal of their complaint. Two human rights organizations promptly released a statement condemning the court's decision. According to human rights activists, Gafarov's arrest is politically motivated.

Journalist and head of "Xural TV," Avaz Zeynalli, was initially sentenced to four months of preventive detention. However, his detention was later extended for an additional three months.

On January 13, 2022, Ali Aliyev, the chairman of the Citizens and Development Party, was sentenced to five months in prison on charges of libel (Article 147.1 of the Criminal Code). This sentence was based on a complaint filed by Emil Jafarov, an officer of the State Border Service (SBS).

== Family ==
Mammadov is married and has five children:

1. Goshgar Mammadov sought political asylum in the United Kingdom in 2004 and was granted full protection under the European Convention on Human Rights and the 1951 Refugee Convention. He is married and has four children. Goshgar Mammadov has followed in his father's footsteps and is well-known in Azerbaijan due to an interview with "Radio Free Europe." His father-in-law was detained the next morning and forced to resign from the Ministry of Taxes of the Azerbaijan Republic, where he had worked for over 17 years.
2. Turan Hagverdiyeva
3. Gunel Mammadova, daughter of Gurban Mammadov, reportedly faced pressure and intimidation in Azerbaijan due to her family association. According to opposition and independent media reports, a group described as police-backed individuals forcibly entered or occupied her apartment during daylight hours while media representatives were present at the scene. Mammadova and her two minor children were allegedly forced to leave the property despite the absence of a publicly presented court eviction order. Following the incident, she reportedly lived in temporary locations and later left Azerbaijan after claiming continued threats to her and her children’s safety. She subsequently applied for political asylum in Switzerland.
4. Elnur Mammadov
5. Chalkhan Mammadli (Mammadov) fled Azerbaijan in March 2016 to escape unlawful prosecution by government officials. He sought asylum in Spain and was granted full protection under the European Convention on Human Rights and the 1951 Refugee Convention. Chalkhan is married and has a son. He was targeted due to his employment, where he provided reporting and journalism services to opposition newspapers and online televisions. He was responsible for collecting and supplying video and audio materials to media outlets. His partnership was exposed, leading to his persecution.
