= Azerbaijan National Academy of Sciences =

Academy of sciences, national learned society of Azerbaijan

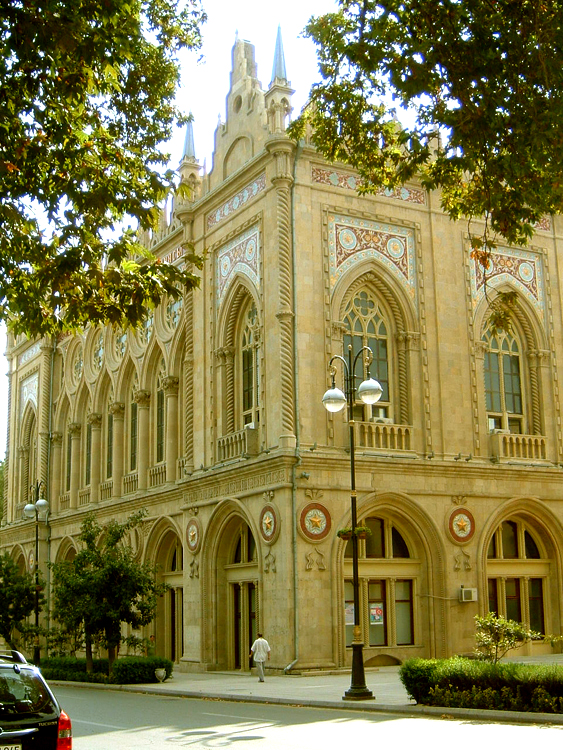
- Presidium of the Azerbaijan National Academy of Sciences in Baku
- Established: 23 January 1945; 81 years ago
- President: Isa Habibbayli
- Staff: 7,000 (63 academicians, 61 corresponding members, 335 doctors of sciences, 1,080 candidates of sciences)
- Formerly called: Academy of Sciences of the Azerbaijan SSR
- Address: 24 Istiglaliyyat Street, Baku, Azerbaijan; Hüseyn Cavid Prospekti, Bakı, Azerbaijan
- Coordinates: 40°22′23″N 49°48′51″E
- Interactive map of Azerbaijan National Academy of Sciences
- Website: www.science.gov.az

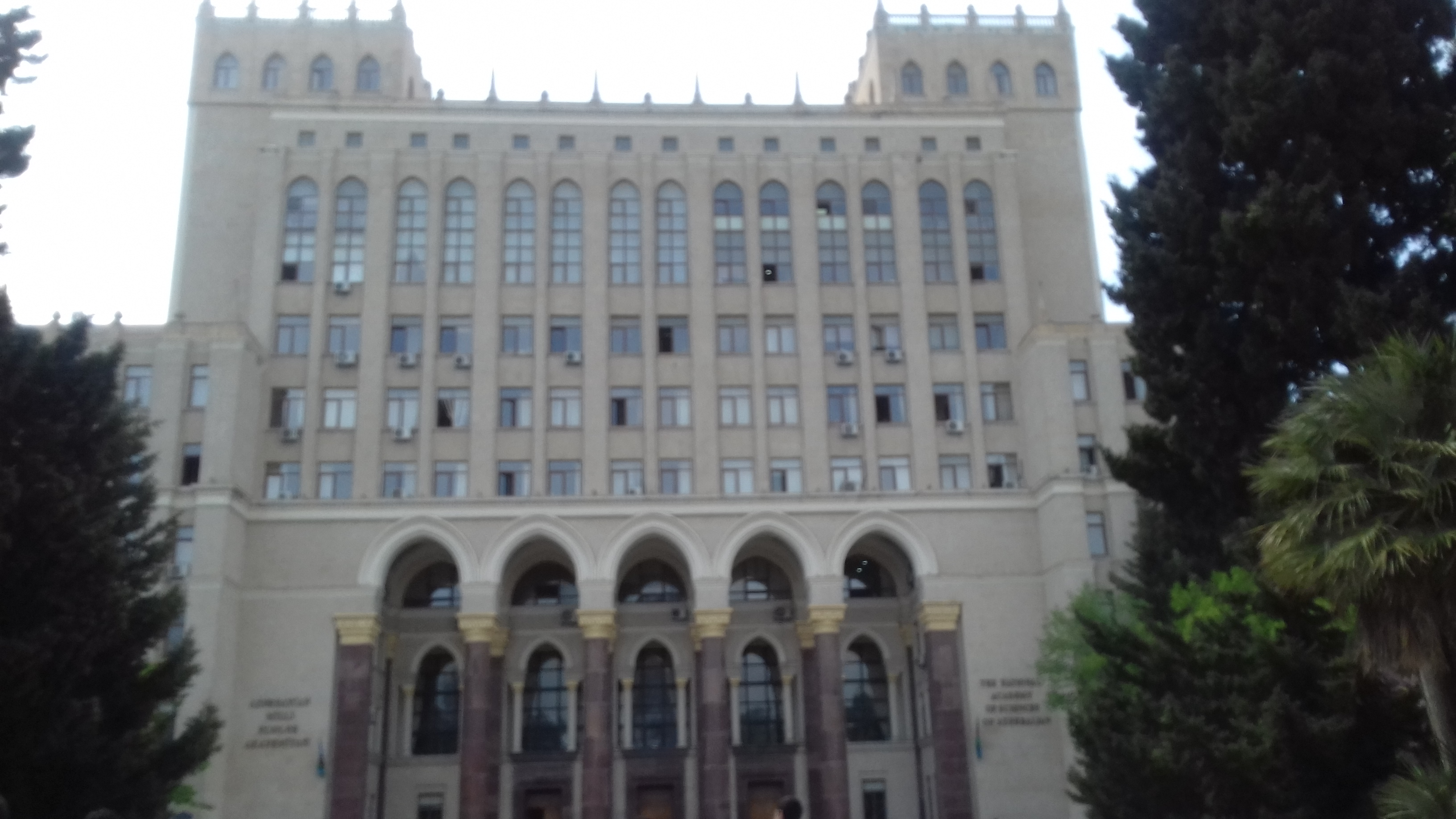
Main building of the Azerbaijan National Academy of Sciences in Baku

Azerbaijan National Academy of Sciences (ANAS) (Azerbaijani: Azərbaycan Milli Elmlər Akademiyası, AMEA), located in Baku, is the main state research organization and the primary body that conducts research and coordinates activities in the fields of science and social sciences in Azerbaijan. It was established on 23 January 1945.

The President of ANAS is Acad. Isa Habibbayli. One section of the ANAS is Republican Seismic Survey Center of Azerbaijan National Academy of Sciences.

== History ==
The Academy was based on the Azerbaijan Society for Scientific Research and Studies, which was first affiliated with Baku State University and later with the USSR Academy of Sciences.

In 1923, the Azerbaijan Society for Researches and Studies that included history, ethnography, economics, and natural sciences, was established as the leading scientific institution of Azerbaijan by the initiative of Nariman Narimanov. In 1929, the Society was reorganized into the Azerbaijan State Scientific Research Institute (ASSRI). ASSRI were coordinating scientific research works, and training scientific cadres for specialized high and secondary schools. In 1932, the Azerbaijani Branch of the Transcaucasian Affiliate of the USSR Academy of Sciences, consisting of 11 divisions and several committees, was organized on the basis of ASSRI. The head of the Branch was Ruhulla Akhundov. Famous Russian scientists such as Ivan Gubkin, Alexander Grossheim, Ivan Meshchaninov, Iosif Yesman, and Azerbaijani scholars such as Bakir Chobanzadeh, Musa Afandiyev, Veli Khuluflu, A. Mammadov, Salman Mumtaz, A. Taghizadeh, etc. conducted scientific researches here.

In 1935, the Azerbaijani Branch of the Transcaucasian Affiliate of the USSR Academy of Sciences was reorganized into the Azerbaijani Affiliate of the Academy of Sciences of the USSR. Chemical, Botany, Zoology, History, Ethnography and Archeology, Language and Literature research institutions, as well as the Divisions of Energy, Physics, Geology, and Soil Science were established on the base of the existing departments of the Branch.

In 1945, the USSR Council of People's Commissars ordered the society to be reorganized into the Academy of Sciences of the Azerbaijan SSR. During its first year, the Academy numbered 15 members; Uzeyir Hajibeyov and Samad Vurgun among them.

In accord with the presidential decree (May 15, 2001), the Azerbaijan Academy of Sciences was granted the status of the "National Academy of Sciences" (ANAS), after 2 years ANAS was given the status of the supreme state body carrying out the scientific and scientific-technical policy of Azerbaijan. Its Charter was granted in the state document.

Following the presidential decrees dated January 12, 2004, and 5 May 2004, the Encyclopedia of Azerbaijan was a part of ANAS and the Scientific Center of the National Encyclopedia of Azerbaijan was established.

The Presidium is currently located in the historical Ismailiyya palace on Istiglaliyyat Street in the center of Baku and is considered one of the most beautiful buildings.

== Charter of ANAS ==
=== The Directions of the functions of the Academy ===
The functions of Azerbaijan National Academy of Science include the organization of scientific activity; carrying out scientific researches covering various scientific fields; coordinating and directing scientific researches of all scientific organizations and universities across the country; implementing state policy on scientific. ANAS represents Azerbaijan in different countries and international scientific events takes measures in order to improve the scientific infrastructure and modernize the material and technical basis of science. Its functions also include strengthening the relations between science and industries, to create mechanisms for the implementation of applied scientific research in line with the needs of the market, and innovative environment for innovative entrepreneurship, developing new types of activities, making proposals for the transfer and acquisition of advanced technologies, and suggestions on the organization of techno-parks, innovation zones, incubation services, technology transfer centers, and shaping the innovation system in Azerbaijan.

=== Duties of the Academy ===
Azerbaijan National Academy of Sciences is responsible for ensuring scientific reforms; organizing scientific researches in various fields of science; providing the organization, coordination, development of researches. The Academy should determine the strategy and priorities of scientific and technical development, participate in the preparation of state programs, make decisions, establish scientific-production-experimental plants, and various economic enterprises and organize interaction between science and production.

Organizing and implementing scientific researches that aimed at the protection of culture, traditions, and customs, strengthening ties between science and education, representing Azerbaijan in international events related to scientific issues, participating in the organization and implementation of international scientific projects, promoting the creation of high-tech manufacturing sites and businesses based on scientific achievements; conducting regular monitoring, providing development of science in the regions of Azerbaijan are also included responsibilities of ANAS. The Academy applies a single center-management model of research carried out in scientific research institutions, takes measures on effectiveness assessment.

== Structure ==
ANAS is organized into six scientific divisions and includes research institutes, regional divisions, regional scientific centers, and organizations operating under its Presidium.

The six scientific divisions are:

- Department of Physical, Mathematical and Technical Sciences
- Department of Chemical Sciences
- Department of Earth Sciences
- Department of Biological and Medical Sciences
- Department of Humanities
- Department of Social Sciences

The Academy has two regional divisions:

- Nakhchivan Branch
- Ganja Division

It also operates regional scientific centers in Shaki, Lankaran and Quba.

The Presidium is the collegial governing body of ANAS. The Academy is headed by its president, who is elected by the General Meeting of ANAS in accordance with the Academy's charter.

== Members ==
The full members of the Academy are selected from among the Corresponding Members of the Academy, who are the citizens of Azerbaijan, and conduct scientific researches, and enrich scientific knowledge.

Just citizens of the Republic of Azerbaijan can be elected as a correspondent member of the Academy. These candidates should have services in the development of science abroad, as well as in Azerbaijan.

Foreign members of the Academy are selected among the scholars who make valuable contributions to the world and Azerbaijani science of foreign countries. Honorary members of the Academy are selected from among the citizens of Azerbaijan, foreigners, and stateless persons, recognized worldwide as the state, public, scientific and cultural figures. Honorary members of the Academy may also be elected at the Presidium, along with the General Meeting of the Academy. The full and correspondent members of the Academy are selected for a lifetime.

The number of full and correspondent members of the Academy is determined by the president of Azerbaijan, taking into consideration the decision of the General Meeting of the Academy. Members of the Academy should assist in the application of scientific achievements, prepare scientific staff, carry out scientific-organizational assignments of the Presidium, and participate in the General Meetings of the Academy and its scientific unit.

Members of the Academy have rights to require the Academy's Presidium to create conditions for them to carry out their scientific research; to present scientific and scientific-organizational issues for the discussion of the Presidium of the Academy and the bureau of the scientific unit of which they are members, to discuss such matters in the General Assembly of the Academy and the Scientific Unit through the Presidium and the Office of Scientific Divisions. When a member of the Academy fails to perform his duties in accordance with the Charter of ANAS, the Academy's Board of Directors discusses it individually and submits it to the General Meeting of the Academy.

The foreign member of the Academy presents to the Presidium of the Academy the proposals on the development of scientific researches and the expansion of international scientific cooperation in the scientific department. The elections of the full, correspondent, foreign and honorary members of the Academy are held no less than once every three years.

The Academy has a two-tier membership. Currently, there are 57 active members and 104 corresponding members. Membership is granted through a vote. The Academy also grants honorary memberships.

== Presidents ==
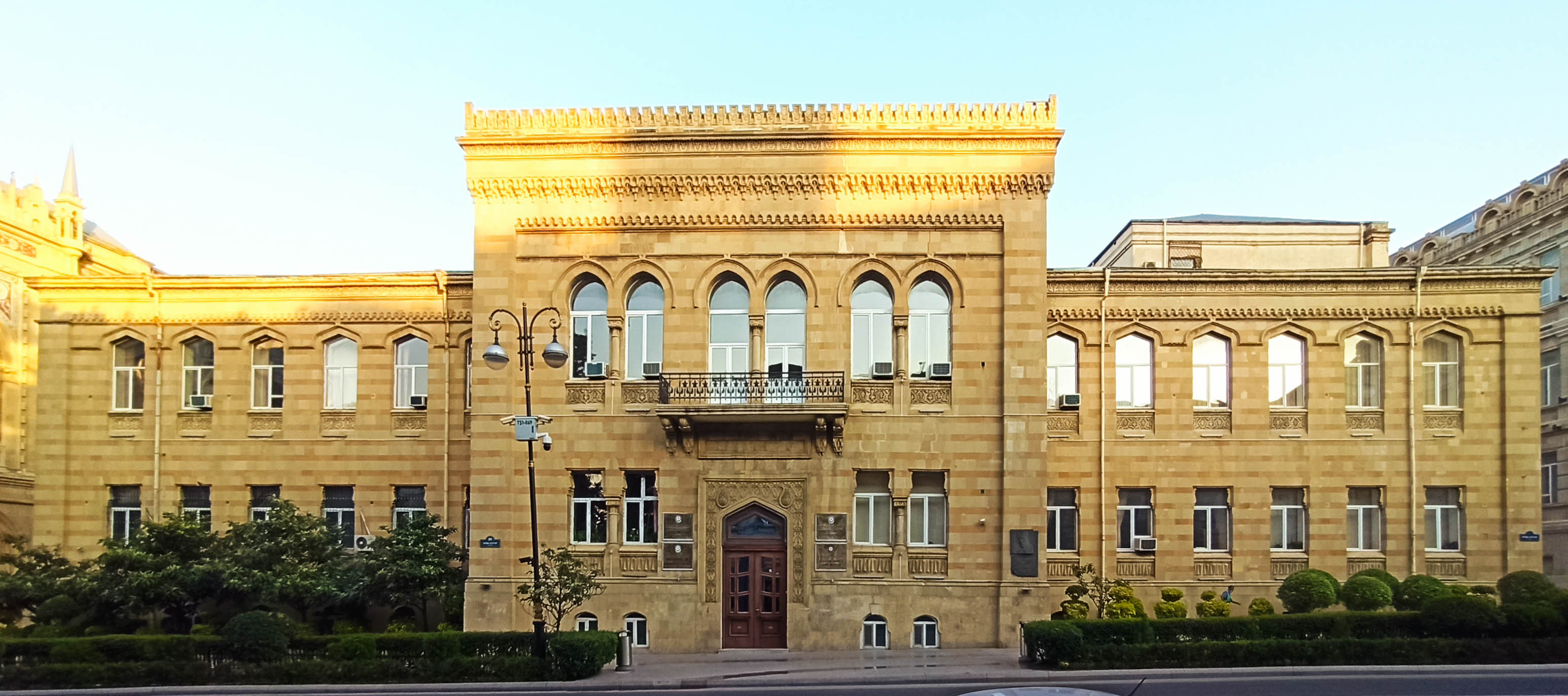
Institute of Manuscripts of Azerbaijan of the Azerbaijan National Academy of Sciences in Baku

The main executive figure in the academy is the President of Azerbaijan National Academy of Sciences who is elected by members of the Academy.

Name of President	Period served
Mir-Asadulla Mirgasimov	1945–1947
Yusif Mammadaliyev	1947–1950; 1958–1961
Musa Aliyev	1950–1958
Zahid Khalilov	1961–1967
Rustam Ismayilov	1967–1970
Hasan Abdullayev	1970–1983
Eldar Salayev	1983–1997
Faramaz Magsudov	1997–2000
Mahmud Karimov	2000–2013
Akif Alizadeh	2013–2019
Ramiz Mehdiyev	2019–2022
Isa Habibbayli	2022–present

=== Vice-presidents ===
1. First Vice-President Academician Isa Habibbayli
2. First Vice-President Academician Ibrahim Guliyev
3. Vice-President Academician Tofig Nagiyev
4. Vice-President Academician Nargiz Pashayeva
5. Vice-President Academician Rasim Alguliyev
6. Vice-President Academician Irada Huseynova
7. Academician-secretary, corresponding member of ANAS Aminaga Sadigov

== International relations ==
=== Agreements ===
Azerbaijan National Academy of Sciences (ANAS) signed memorandums, memorandums of understanding, agreements, agreements of understanding on scientific cooperation, cooperation in the field of science and technology together with the relevant scientific academies in the world such as the Polish Academy of Sciences, Turkish Scientific and Technological Research Council (TSTRC), the Academy of Sciences of the Republic of Tajikistan, the Moldova Academy of Sciences, Latvian Academy of Sciences, Spanish Academy of Economics and Finance, Turkish Academy (Kazakh Academy), Serbian Academy of Science and Art, the Israeli Academy of Humanitarian and Medical Sciences, Turkish Center for Caspian Studies.

== Criticism ==
The Academy was criticized by several members of the National Assembly, in July 2012 for publishing a children's tale called "The Unwanted Son-In-Law," which contained vulgar language and graphic scenes of incest. The story was published in 2007 in the sixth volume of the ambiguously titled "Tales" anthology. Kamila Aliyeva, a member of the Science and Education Committee was quoted as saying "I wonder if they were aware of the contents of the book," she asked. "If they were, it is shameful. And if they were not, it is also shameful."

In a book published in 2007 by the Ministry of Culture and Tourism of the Republic of Azerbaijan and endorsed by the Academy, the country of Armenia is presented as "Western Azerbaijan." It depicts all monuments in Armenia as "Turkic", "Turkish" or "Armenian-Turkish", such as the Roman Temple of Garni being connected to the "ancient Gargar Turks", and the Etchmiadzin Cathedral as a "7th-century Armenian-Turkish Christian temple". According to the scholar and sociologist Hratch Tchilingirian, "this kind of re-writing of "history" is based solely on sources produced by Azerbaijani authors, notably prominent academician and national figure Ziya Buniyatov, whom President Heydar Aliyev described as "the constructor of our identity and self-consciousness". This constructed narrative is echoed in the political discourse of President Aliyev and is woven into state policies, diplomacy, public relations, identity construction and, critically, in the construction of extreme anti-Armenianism in Azerbaijan."

== Nationalistic Statements on Armenia and Armenians ==
According to the institute director of ANAS, Yagub Mahmudov, prior to 1918 "there was never an Armenian state in the South Caucasus". According to Mahmudov, Ilham Aliyev's statement in which he said that Irevan is our [Azerbaijan's] historic land, and we, Azerbaijanis must return to these historic lands, was based "historical facts" and "historical reality". Mahmudov also stated that the claim that Armenian's are the most ancient people in the region is based on propaganda, and claimed that Armenians are non-natives of the region, having only arrived in the area after Russian victories over Iran and the Ottoman Empire in the first half of the 19th century, disregarding that Armenian kingdoms have been present in the region since antiquity.

The institute director also said:

The Azerbaijani soldier should know that the land under the feet of provocative Armenians is Azerbaijani land. The enemy can never defeat Azerbaijanis on Azerbaijani soil. Those who rule the Armenian state today must fundamentally change their political course. The Armenians cannot defeat us by sitting in our historic city of Irevan.

== Notable alumni ==
- Bahman Akhundov
- Maryam Seyidbeyli
- Alec Rasizade

== Affiliations ==
The academy is a member of the Caucasus University Association.

== See also ==
- ANAS Central Library of Science
