= National Encyclopedia of Azerbaijan =

Universal encyclopedic book written in Azerbaijani language

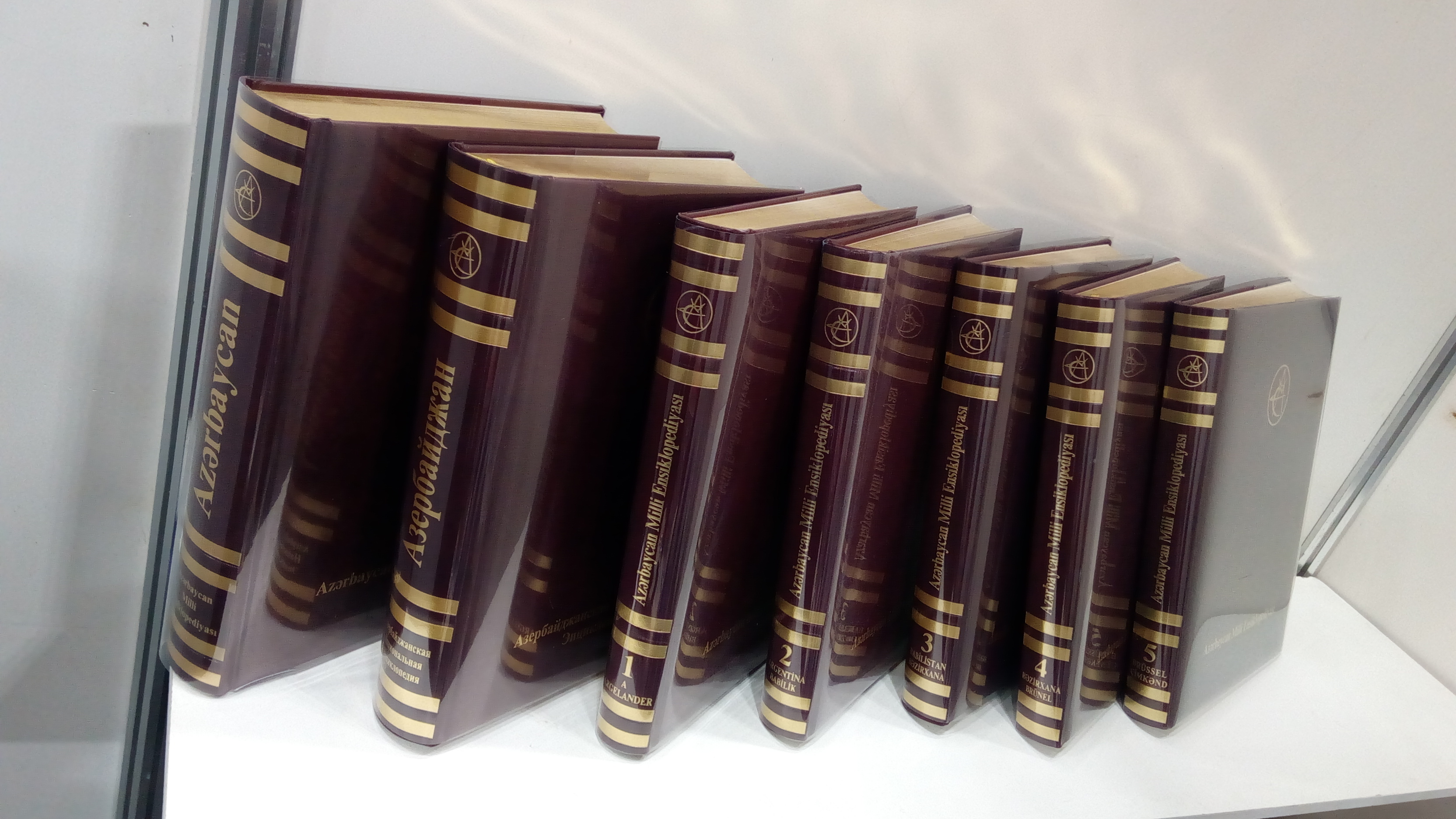
- Original title: Azərbaycan Milli Ensiklopediyası
- Language: Azerbaijani
- Subject: General
- Publisher: National Encyclopedia of Azerbaijan Scientific Center
- Publication date: 2007–present
- Media type: 11 volumes (as of 2025)
- Preceded by: Azerbaijani Soviet Encyclopedia
- Website: ensiklopediya.gov.az

Azerbaijani National Encyclopedia (Azerbaijani: Azərbaycan Milli Ensiklopediyası) is a universal encyclopedic book written in the Azerbaijani language and has been published since 2007. The main building of the publisher is situated in Old City (Baku) (İçeri Şəhər), Böyük Qala Street.

== Historical overview ==
The initial attempt to publish the Azerbaijani encyclopedia was in the early years of the 20th century, but it was not published at that time. The decree for the Publication of the Azerbaijani Soviet Encyclopedia was signed on December 30, 1965, and the first volume was published in 1970, but publication was suspended because of non-compliance with Soviet regulations. By the order in 1975, the encyclopedia was restored. During the years of 1976–1987, the publication of a new version of the encyclopedia was completed, replacing the previous version.

Following independence, a decree was issued on May 30, 2000, authorizing the publication of the Azerbaijan National Encyclopedia. On 5 May 2004, a presidential decree was signed for the establishment of the Research Center of the Azerbaijani National Encyclopedia to ensure the preparation and publication of the encyclopedia. The encyclopedia was published by the Research Center under the Azerbaijan National Academy of Sciences. The first 25 thousand copies were published by Şərq-Qərb publishers and delivered to the libraries and other organizations free of charge.

In 2007, a special volume called “Azerbaijan” was published. Furthermore, the first volume of the Azerbaijan national encyclopedia was published in 2009. It is intended to publish a total of 20 volumes of the encyclopedia, and each volume contains 800–900 pages. Each volume of the encyclopedia will be issued in an edition of thirty thousand copies.

== Editions ==
=== Russian version ===
Russian version of the Azerbaijani national encyclopedia was published in an edition of five thousand copies. It is a general collection about Azerbaijan, which contains information about history, culture, literature, science and education of the country.

In 2012 special volume in Russian was published in Germany.

=== Other editions ===
- Unnumbered volume. Azərbaycan // Azerbaijani National Encyclopedia — ISBN 978-9952-441-01-7.
- Volume 1. A – Argelander // Azerbaijani National Encyclopedia — ISBN 978-9952-441-02-4.
- Volume 2. Argentina – Babilik // Azerbaijani National Encyclopedia — ISBN 978-9952-441-05-5.
- Volume 3. Babilistan – Bəzirxana // Azerbaijani National Encyclopedia — ISBN 978-9952-441-07-9.
- Volume 4. Bəzirxana – Brünel // Azerbaijani National Encyclopedia — ISBN 978-9952-441-03-1.
- Volume 5. Brüssel – Çimli-podzol torpaqlar // Azerbaijani National Encyclopedia — ISBN 978-9952-441-10-9.
- Volume 6. Çin – Dərk // Azerbaijani National Encyclopedia — ISBN 978-9952-441-11-6.
- Volume 7. Dərman – Enoftalm // Azerbaijani National Encyclopedia — ISBN 978-9952-441-12-3.
- Volume 8. Enollar – Fedin // Azerbaijani National Encyclopedia — ISBN 978-9952-441-13-0.
- Volume 9. Fedinq – Gitara // Azerbaijani National Encyclopedia — ISBN 978-9952-441-17-8.
- Volume 10. Giyan – Hindistan // Azerbaijani National Encyclopedia.
- Volume 11. Hindistanda xalq üsyanı – “İqdam” // Azerbaijani National Encyclopedia.

== See also ==
- Azerbaijani Soviet Encyclopedia
