= Taraggi Medal =

Taraggi "Tərəqqi" medalı
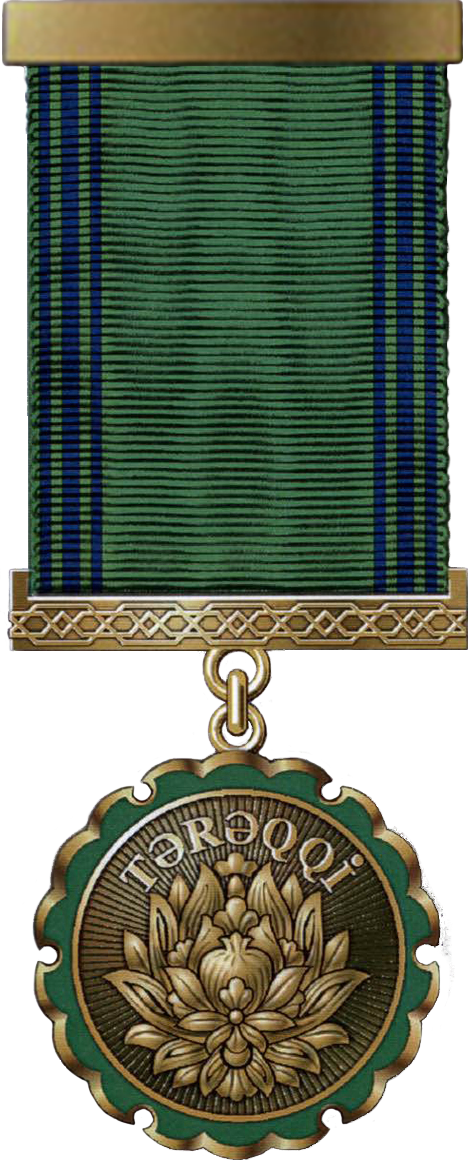
- Type: Individual Award
- Awarded for: Special contributions in the sphere of science, culture, literature, arts, public education and health, etc.
- Presented by: President of Azerbaijan
- Eligibility: Azerbaijani government's civilian personnel, citizens and non-citizens, foreign civilians
- Clasps: 1
- Status: Active
- Established: December 6, 1993. Decree No. 758

Precedence
- Next (higher): For Services in the Rear in the Patriotic War Medal; Medal for Courage

The Taraggi Medal ("Progress Medal"; Azerbaijani: "Tərəqqi" medalı) – is the state award of Azerbaijan Republic. The award was created by Heydar Aliyev, the President of the Republic of Azerbaijan, on December 6, 1993 by the Decree No. 758. Recipients of the award include Leyla Aliyeva, the daughter of Azerbaijan's ruler Ilham Aliyev and granddaughter of former ruler Heydar Aliyev.

== Status ==
The Taraggi Medal is given to:

- Citizens of Azerbaijan Republic
- Foreign nationals and non-citizens of Azerbaijan Republic
- People without citizenship

The medal is given to distinguished persons for the following services:

- Special contributions in the sphere of industry and agriculture;
- Revelation and innovatory proposals of the great importance;
- Special contributions in the sphere of science, culture, literature, arts, public education and health;
- Special contributions on building and reconstruction of agricultural objects;
- Productive activity in development of physical culture and sport.

The medal also was given for particular merits. For example, from July 4, 2011 the medal was given to several persons in the sphere of development of Azerbaijani diaspora by Ilham Aliyev, the President of Azerbaijan Republic.

The Taraggi medal is pinned to the left side of the chest and if there are other medals or orders of Azerbaijan Republic the Taraggi medal is followed Medal for Courage.

== Description ==
The Taraggi Medal is made of brass metal in the form of oval and sharp-edged salient ornament with sizes of 51 mm along vertical line and 48 mm along horizontal line. There is a 51 mm diameter circle in the centre of the ornament framed with decorated stripe of 2,5 mm width, a stripe with curved endings on which is a relief inscription Taraggi, a bud like a branched tree against the background of the radiant Sun. And there is a seven edged star on the top. There are pictures of a crescent and eight-edged star on the rear top side of the medal. There is a stretched hexagon in the bottom for writing the awarding date. The medal is bordered with a salient ledge. All inscriptions and pictures are salient. With the help of eye ring the medal is attached to a tetragonal block. The block consists of 2 ornamented parts concatenated with moiré ribbon of brown color. The left top and bottom edges of the ribbon are olive and are intersected by golden lines of 1 mm width. The whole width of the ribbon is 19 mm. Size of the block is 46 mm x 22 mm.

== Recipients ==
- Leyla Aliyeva – the daughter of Azerbaijan's ruler Ilham Aliyev and granddaughter of former ruler Heydar Aliyev.
- Ilkin Mammadov - Head of the International Relations Department of the National Assembly of Azerbaijan
- Aziz Seyidov – lawyer, Justice of the Supreme Court of Azerbaijan.
- Tale Heydarov – chair of European-Azerbaijani Society
- Erich Feigl – Austrian] writer, journalist, documentary film-maker and film producer
- Rahid Alekberli – chief technical officer of Delta Telecom
- Ramin Isayev
- Elchin Safaraly-oghlu Babayev
- Enes Cansever – Zaman Daily editor-in-chief
- Iskandar Shirali – the head of Integrated Drilling Trust of the State Oil Company of Azerbaijan Republic (SOCAR)
- Said Irandoust
- Seven representatives from the Azerbaijan Red Crescent Society
- Azerbaijan National Agency for Mine Action
- Medical workers.
- Employees of Azerbaijan National Library
- Education workers of the Ganja State University
- Teymur Hajiyev
- German Zaharyaev – Azerbaijani born Russian billionaire
- Rashad Nabiyev – chair of the board and chief executive officer of Azercosmos.
- Namig Mammadov – Azerbaijani public figure, businessman and maecenas.
- Shakir Hasanov – Azerbaijani engineer
- Gulshan Aliyeva-Kengerli – professor
- Yusif Jabbarov - Chairman of NEQSOL Holding
- Ramiz Aliguliyev — director of the Institute of Data Science and Artificial Intelligence at Azerbaijan Technical University.
