= 6th National Assembly of Azerbaijan =

6th convocation of the Milli Majlis of Azerbaijan
←	5th convocation	7th convocation	→
- Seat composition of the 6th National Assembly

Overview
- Legislative body: National Assembly (Azerbaijan)
- Jurisdiction: Azerbaijan
- Meeting place: National Assembly Building, Parliament Avenue, 1
- Term: 10 March 2020 – 21 June 2024
- Election: 9 February 2020
- Government: New Azerbaijan Party
- Website: meclis.gov.az
- Members: 125
- Speaker: Sahiba Gafarova (YAP)
- First Deputy Speaker: Ali Huseynli (YAP)
- Deputy Speakers: Fazail Ibrahimli (VHP); Adil Aliyev (Ind.)
- Party control: YAP-Independents

The 6th convocation of the Milli Majlis of Azerbaijan were formed on the basis of the elections held on 9 February 2020.

70 out of 125 deputies of the Milli Majlis were members of the New Azerbaijan Party (NAP). VI convocation VHP was represented in the Milli Majlis by 3 people, AVP, ADISP, ADMP, BGP, BAXCP, VAHDAT and VBP by 1 person. 41 members were independent.

On March 10, 2020, the first session of the Milli Majlis of the VI convocation took place. The term of office of the deputies of the 6th convocation of the Milli Majlis will end on March 10, 2025.

The 6th convocation was chaired by YAP member Sahiba Gafarova, the first deputy chairman was neutral Adil Aliyev, and the deputy chairmen were VHP member Fazail Ibrahimli and YAP member Ali Huseynli. Sahiba Gafarova became the first female speaker of the National Assembly of Azerbaijan.

Fattah Heydarov, born in 1938, was the oldest among the deputies of the 6th convocation of the Milli Majlis, and Sabina Khasayeva, born in 1993, was the youngest.

== List of members ==
This list includes the current deputies of the National Assembly.

Constituency		Deputy	Party	Birth date	Notes
Sharur-Sadarak	1	Vasif Talibov	YAP	14 January 1960	
Sharur	2	Isa Habibbayli	YAP	16 October 1949	
Babek-Kangarli-Nakhchivan	3	Sattar Mohbaliyev	Ind.	28 October 1955	
Nakhchivan municipal	4	Eldar Ibrahimov	YAP	12 March 1945	
Shahbuz-Babek	5	Siyavush Novruzov	YAP	17 February 1969	
Julfa-Babek	6	Ulviyya Hamzayeva	YAP	30 April 1982	
Ordubad-Julfa	7	Jabi Guliyev	YAP	30 August 1990	
First Binagadi	8	Azay Guliyev	Ind.	23 June 1971	
Second Binagadi	9	Kamaladdin Gafarov	YAP	7 September 1976	
Third Binagadi	10	Mader Moussayev	Ind.	26 November 1947	
Garadagh	11	Aydin Hüseynov	YAP	12 February 1962	
Garadagh-Binagadi-Yasamal	12	Sabina Khasayeva	YAP	30 March 1993	
Khazar-Pirallahi	13	Rauf Aliyev	YAP	27 May 1956	
Khazar	14	Soltan Mammadov	Ind.	1 April 1974	
First Yasamal	15	Ulvi Guliyev	Ind.	17 September 1966	
Second Yasamal	16	Erkin Gadirli	REAL	13 May 1972	
Third Yasama	17	Elnur Allahverdiyev	YAP	21 April 1978	
Narimanov-Nizami	18	Rasim Musabayov	Ind.	1 January 1951	
First Narimanov	19	Hikmet Mammedov	YAP	17 April 1966	
Second Narimanov	20	Adil Aliyev	Ind.	25 September 1969	
First Nasimi	21	Malahat Ibrahimgizi	YAP	25 April 1958	
Second Nasimi	22	Asim Mollazade	DİP	6 June 1953	
Nasimi-Sabayil	23	Ziyad Samadzade	Ind.	25 June 1940	
First Nizami	24	Konul Nurullayeva	Ind.	1 December 1985	
Second Nizami	25	Sadagat Valiyeva	YAP	23 December 1954	
First Sabunchu	26	Fazil Mustafa	BQP	15 October 1965	
Second Sabunchu	27	Aliabbas Salahzade	YAP	22 January 1979	
Third Sabunchu	28	Eldar Guliyev	Ind.	26 July 1951	
Sabayil	29	Nigar Arpadarai	Ind.	17 January 1982	
First Surakhani	30	Sevinj Fataliyeva	YAP	17 August 1979	
Second Surakhani	31	Etibar Aliyev	Ind.	1 March 1963	
Third Surakhani	32	Afet Hasanova	YAP	3 September 1960	
First Khatai	33	Vacant			
Second Khatai	34	Mikhail Zabelin	YAP	19 March 1946	
Third Khatai	35	Vacant			
Fourth Khatai	36	Gudrat Hasanguliyev	BAXCP	9 December 1965	
First Nizami (Ganja)	37	Parvin Karimzade	YAP	3 February 1976	
Secong Nizami (Ganja)	38	Nagif Hamzayev	YAP	24 May 1983	
First Kapaz (Ganja)	39	Mushfig Jafarov	YAP	26 July 1981	
Second Kapaz (Ganja)	40	Musa Guliyev	YAP	25 November 1961	
First Sumgait	41	Hijran Huseynova	YAP	13 August 1955	
Second Sumgait	42	Tahir Mirkishili	YAP	7 June 1977	
Third Sumgait	43	Emin Hajiyev	YAP	13 February 1982	
Sumgait-Khizi	44	Mushfiq Mammadli	YAP	1 August 1972	
Absheron	45	Ogtay Asadov	YAP	3 January 1955	
Shirvan	46	Iltizam Yusifov	Ind.	1 December 1963	
Minghechevir	47	Aydin Mirzazade	YAP	2 July 1957	
Yevlakh	48	Ilham Mammadov	YAP	13 January 1962	
Yevlakh-Minghechevir	49	Ali Huseynli	YAP	8 October 1968	
Absheron-Gobustan	50	~~Shahin Seyidzade~~	~~Ind.~~	15 April 1978	Until 17 March 2022 (Note: On 3 March 2022, he was appointed by the President of Azerbaijan as the head of the Icherisheher State Historical-Architectural Reserve Department. At the meeting of the Central Election Commission held on 17 March 2022, Sahin Seyidzade's deputy mandate was terminated.)
Gusar	51	Azer Badamov	YAP	18 August 1968	
Guba	52	Vahid Ahmadov	Ind.	2 April 1947	
Guba-Gusar	53	Anatoly Rafailov	Ind.	5 February 1953	
Shabran-Siyazan	54	Sadiq Gurbanov	YAP	12 July 1972	
Khachmaz urban	55	~~Eldeniz Salimov~~	~~YAP (Note: On 2 August 2021, Eldeniz Salimov was expelled from the party by the decision of the Board of Directors of Khachmaz district organization of YAP.)~~	2 November 1976	Until 27 December 2021 (Note: On 27 December 2021, Eldeniz Salimov's deputy mandate was terminated by a court decision.)
Khachmaz rural	56	Sevil Mikayilova	Ind.	27 June 1974	
Kurdamir	57	Amina Agazade	Ind.	26 March 1980	
Hajikabul-Kurdamir	58	Rafael Huseynov	VHP	12 August 1955	
Salyan	59	Jala Ahmadova	Ind.	23 April 1981	
Salyan-Neftchala	60	Fazail Agamali	AVP	27 August 1947	
Neftchala	61	Sabir Rustamkhanli	VHP	20 May 1946	
Saatli	62	Aziz Alakbarli	YAP	5 October 1960	
First Sabirabad	63	Kamal Jafarov	YAP	15 December 1989	
Second Sabirabad	64	Ramin Mammadov	YAP	17 February 1979	
Saatli-Sabirabad-Kurdamir	65	Ahliman Amiraslanov	YAP	17 November 1947	
Bilasuvar	66	Bahruz Maharramov	Ind.	22 August 1983	
Jalilabad	67	Malik Hasanov	YAP	15 February 1971	
Jalilabad rural	68	Elman Nasirov	YAP	15 February 1971	
Jalilabad-Masalli-Bilasuvar	69	Fazail Ibrahimli	VHP	12 April 1951	
Masalli urban	70	Mashur Mammadov	YAP	4 October 1963	
Masalli rural	71	Anar Isgandarov	YAP	10 January 1956	
Yardimli-Masalli	72	Musa Gasimli	Ind.	28 October 1957	
Lankaran urban	73	Rufet Quliyev	Ind.	6 June 1963	
Lankaran rural	74	Vacant			
Lankaran-Masalli	75	Javanshir Pashazade	YAP	12 April 1953	
Lankaran-Astara	76	Ziyafat Asgarov	YAP	24 October 1963	
Astara	77	Rashad Mahmudov	YAP	18 January 1974	
Lerik	78	Iqbal Mammadov	YAP	6 January 1965	
Imishli	79	Razi Nurullayev	MCP	1 April 1971	
Imishli-Beylagan	80	Vacant			
Beylagan	81	Sahin Ismayilov	YAP	7 February 1986	
Agjabedi	82	Tahir Rzayev	YAP	24 February 1950	
Agjabedi-Fuzuli	83	Agil Abbas	Ind.	1 April 1953	
Fuzuli	84	Vugar Bayramov	Ind.	13 June 1975	
Shamakhi	85	Tamam Jafarova	Ind.	5 April 1960	
Ismayilli	86	Novruzali Aslanov	Ind.	22 March 1963	
Agsu-Ismayilli	87	Tahir Karimli	VP	5 March 1956	
Gioychay	88	Sabir Hajiyev	VBP	5 October 1954	
Gioychay-Agdash	89	Mazahir Afandiyev	Ind.	1 February 1976	
Agdash	90	Javid Osmanov	YAP	6 February 1975	
Ujar	91	Ramil Hasan	YAP	23 September 1978	
Zardab-Ujar	92	Jala Aliyeva	Ind.	5 October 1966	
Barda urban	93	Fatma Yildirim	YAP	12 January 1973	
Barda rural	94	Zahid Oruj	Ind.	1 February 1972	
Terter	95	Sahib Aliyev	Ind.	24 August 1964	
Goranboy-Naftalan	96	Anar Mammadov	YAP	21 June 1984	
Goranboy-Agdam-Terter	97	Agalar Valiyev	YAP	23 July 1957	
Shamkir urban	98	Sahiba Gafarova	YAP	19 March 1955	Speaker of the National Assembly
Shamkir rural	99	Nurlan Hasanov	YAP	3 February 1988	
Shamkir-Dashkasan	100	Kamran Bayramov	YAP	10 November 1979	
Gioygol-Dashkasan	101	Elshad Mirbashir oghlu	YAP	27 July 1977	
Samukh-Shamkir	102	Nizami Safarov	YAP	30 November 1960	
Gadabey	103	Sevinj Huseynova	YAP	28 January 1970	
Gadabey-Tovuz	104	Arzu Nagiyev	Ind.	27 July 1963	
Tovuz	105	Ganira Pashayeva	Ind.	24 March 1975	
Tovuz-Gazakh-Agstafa	106	Ulviyya Aghayeva	Ind.	18 September 1978	
Gazakh	107	Samad Seyidov	YAP	18 January 1964	
Agstafa	108	Nizami Jafarov	YAP	21 September 1959	
Balakyan	109	Nasib Mahamaliyev	YAP	11 February 1961	
Zagatala	110	Elshan Musayev	ADMP	11 August 1979	
Zagatala-Balakyan	111	Kamila Aliyeva	YAP	8 June 1967	
Gakh	112	Azer Karimli	Ind.	6 July 1964	
Sheki urban	113	Vugar Iskanderov	YAP	30 December 1972	
Sheki rural	114	Ali Masimli	Ind.	3 January 1953	
Second Sheki rural	115	Javanshir Feyziyev	Ind.	12 July 1963	
Gabala	116	~~Fattah Heydarov~~	~~Ind.~~	~~23 February 1938~~	Oldest deputy, died on 4 August 2020
Oguz-Gabala	117	Agiya Nakhchivanli	YAP	11 March 1950	
Agdam urban	118	Bakhtiyar Aliyev	Ind.	20 March 1961	
Agdam rural	119	Bakhtiyar Sadigov	YAP	10 January 1951	
Jabrayil-Gubadli	120	Jeyhun Mammadov	YAP	28 January 1975	
Lachin	121	Mahir Abbaszade	YAP	27 October 1975	
Khankendi	122	Tural Ganjaliyev	Ind.	6 March 1980	
Kalbajar	123	Agil Mammadov	YAP	1 April 1960	
Shusha-Agdam-Khojali-Khojavend	124	Elman Mammadov	YAP	18 October 1950	
Zanghilan-Gubadli	125	Imamverdi Ismayilov	YAP	10 June 1958	
