= 7th National Assembly of Azerbaijan =

7th convocation of the Milli Majlis of Azerbaijan
←	6th convocation
- Seat composition of the 7th National Assembly

Overview
- Legislative body: National Assembly
- Meeting place: National Assembly Building
- Term: 30 September 2024 –
- Election: 1 September 2024
- Government: New Azerbaijan Party
- Opposition: Independents and minor parties
- Website: meclis.gov.az
- Members: 125
- Speaker: Sahiba Gafarova (YAP)
- First Deputy Speaker: Ali Huseynli (YAP)
- Deputy Speakers: Fazail Ibrahimli (VHP); Adil Aliyev (Ind.)
- Party control: YAP majority

The 7th convocation of the Milli Majlis of Azerbaijan was formed on the basis of the snap elections held on 1 September 2024. The first session of the 7th convocation took place on 30 September 2024, during which newly elected deputies were sworn in, parliamentary committees were formed, and the legislative agenda for the autumn session was adopted.

== Composition ==
The Milli Majlis has 125 deputies. The party composition after the 2024 snap elections is as follows:

- New Azerbaijan Party – 68 seats
- Independents – 44 seats
- Civic Solidarity – 3 seats
- Justice – 2 seats
- Others / minor parties – 8 seats

The New Azerbaijan Party holds a majority in parliament, while independents form the main opposition bloc.

== Leadership ==
- Speaker: Sahiba Gafarova (YAP), reelected during the first session on 30 September 2024.
- First Deputy Speaker: Ali Huseynli (YAP).
- Deputy Speakers: Fazail Ibrahimli (VHP) and Adil Aliyev (Independent).

== Sessions ==
The 7th convocation convenes two ordinary sessions per year (spring and autumn). Extraordinary sessions can be called by the Speaker, the President, or a majority of deputies. Committees cover key areas such as foreign affairs, finance, security, and legislation.
