= List of members of the National Assembly of Azerbaijan (2015–2020) =

List of V convocation deputies of the National Assembly of Azerbaijan were formed on the basis of the Azerbaijani parliamentary election in 2015.

71 of the 125 deputies of the National Assembly were members of the New Azerbaijan Party. Whole Azerbaijan Popular Front Party, Party for Democratic Reforms, Great Order Party, National Revival Movement Party, Social Democratic Party, Motherland Party, Azerbaijan Social Prosperity Party, Civic Solidarity Party, Unity Party, Civic Unity Party, Azerbaijan Democratic Enlightenment Party was represented by a deputy in the parliament. 42 members of the National Assembly were non-partisan. Chairman of the V convocation of the National Assembly is Ogtay Asadov, First Deputy Minister Ziyafat Asgarov and Deputy Chairmen of the Assembly Bahar Muradova and Valeh Alasgarov. 104 members of parliament were men and 21 were women.

== Leadership ==
Picture	Name	Note
	Ogtay Asadov	The Chairman of the Milli Mejlis of Azerbaijan Republic
	Ziyafat Asgarov	First Deputy of the Chairman of the Milli Mejlis of Azerbaijan Republic
	Bahar Muradova	Deputy of the Chairman of the Milli Mejlis of Azerbaijan Republic
	Valeh Alasgarov	Deputy of the Chairman of the Milli Mejlis of Azerbaijan Republic

== List of V convocation deputies of the National Assembly ==
Picture	Name	Note	Party
	Vasif Talibov	President of Nakhchivan Autonomous Republic	New Azerbaijan Party
	Isa Habibbayli	the vice-president of the Azerbaijan National Academy of Sciences	New Azerbaijan Party
	Səttar Mehbalıyev		Non-partisan
	Eldar İbrahimov		New Azerbaijan Party
	Siyavush Novruzov		New Azerbaijan Party
	Ulviyya Hamzayeva		New Azerbaijan Party
	Gudrat Hasanguliyev		Whole Azerbaijan Popular Front Party
	Azay Guliyev	The vice-president of the OSCE Parliamentary Assembly	Non-partisan
	Kamaləddin Qafarov		New Azerbaijan Party
	Mader Musayev		Non-partisan
	Aydın Huseynov		New Azerbaijan Party
