= Natig Rasulzadeh =

Azerbaijani writer

Natig Rasulzadeh

Natig Rasulzadeh (also spelled Natik via Russian; Azerbaijani: Natiq Rəsulzadə) is a contemporary Azerbaijani writer. He was born in Baku on June 5, 1949. At age 17, he was already publishing in “Youth of Azerbaijan” newspaper. After finishing high school, Rasulzadeh entered the Baku Polytechnic Institute (now Azerbaijan Technical University). However, four years later, he quit his studies and transferred to the Maxim Gorky Literature Institute in Moscow, Russia. His works have been published regularly in Baku and Moscow newspapers since 1970.

In 1975, after having graduated from the Literature Institute, Natig Rasulzadeh returned to Baku and began working as an editor at the “Azerneshr” publishing house. A year later, he moved to “Azerbaijanfilm” film studio, first working as an editor at the Documentary Chronicles department and later at the Feature Film department.

In 1979, Natig started working at “Literary Azerbaijan” magazine. In early 1990s, Natig became chief editor of “Araz” magazine, which at the time had circulation of 50,000. The magazine was distributed all over the Former Soviet Union and later in CIS countries. A few years later, the magazine was closed and Natig went back to the “Literary Azerbaijan” magazine, where he keeps working to date, as the head of the Prose Department.

Natig Rasulzadeh is a member of Azerbaijan Writers Union and Azerbaijan Cinematographers Union. He is the author of about 30 books, which have been published in Baku, Moscow, Hungary, Poland and Yugoslavia. Among them such books as:

- Notes of a Self-Murderer (Zapiski Samoubiytsi)
- Rider in the Night (Vsadnik v Nochi)
- Nonsense (Nonsens)
- Year of Love (God Lyubvi)
- Rain on the Holiday (Dozhd v Prazdnik)
- Among Ghosts (Sredi Prizrakov)
- I Am Drawing a Bird (Risuyu Ptitsu)
- Roads under the Stars (Dorogi pod Zvyozdami)
- Person from the Choir (Chelovek iz Khora)

He has written screenplays for numerous movies including:

- Don't Believe Fairies (Ne Verte Feyam)
- Rain on the Holiday (Dozhd v Prazdnik)
- Live, Gold Fish! (Jivi, Zolotaya Ribka!)
- Delusion (Navazhdeniye)
- Person from the Choir (Chelovek iz Khora)
- Murder on the Night Train (Ubiystvo v Nochnom Poyezde)
- Robbers (Grabiteli)
- Outcast (Izgoy)
- Once Upon a Time There Lived a Cow (Zhila-Bila Korova)
- Music Lessons (Uroki Muziki)
- Wizard (Koldun)

Together with Eldar Guliyev, he has written: This Wonderful World (Etot Prekrasniy Mir) and Sanatorium (Sanatoriy) and with Vagif Mustafayev, the co-authored Monument (Pamyatnik).

In 1984, Natig Rasulzadeh received the Azerbaijan GosTeleRadio (State TV and Radio) Award for Best Play of the Year (1984) and the SSR Russian Ostrovsky Award. He was recipient of Azerbaijan Komsomol Award (1988) and Honored Art Worker (1999).
