= Huseynli (surname) =

Huseynli or Hüseynli is a surname. Notable people with the surname include:

- Ali Huseynli (born 1968), Azerbaijani politician
- Rauf Hüseynli (born 2000), Azerbaijani footballer
- Vatan Huseynli (fl. 2012), Azerbaijani boxer
