= Fazail =

Fazail is a masculine given name and a surname. Notable people with the name include:

== Given name ==
- Fazail Agamali (1947–2026), Azerbaijani politician, historian and academic
- Fazail Ibrahimli (born 1951), Azerbaijani politician

== Surname ==
- Afiq Fazail (born 1994), Malaysian footballer
- Irfan Fazail (born 1991), Malaysian footballer, brother of Afiq
