= Tahir Mirkishili =

Azerbaijani politician (born 1977)

- Tahir Mirkişili
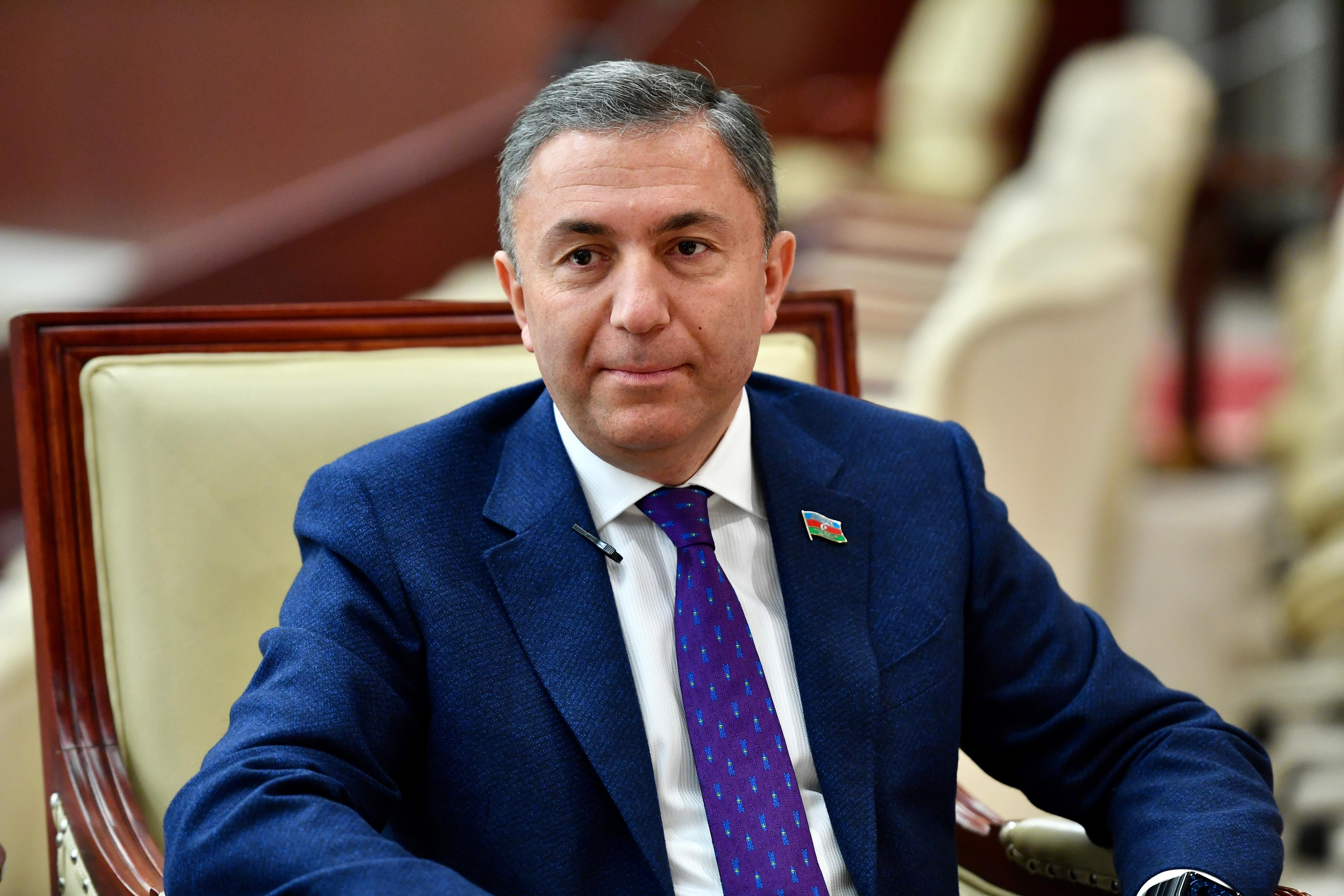

Member of the 7th National Assembly of Azerbaijan
- Incumbent
- Assumed office 2024
- Constituency: Sumgait II

Member of the 6th National Assembly of Azerbaijan
- In office 2020–2024
- Constituency: Sumgait II

Member of the 5th National Assembly of Azerbaijan
- In office 2015–2020
- Constituency: Sumgait II

Personal details
- Born: 7 June 1977 (age 49) Həmzəli, Qubadli, Azerbaijan SSR, USSR
- Party: New Azerbaijan
- Education: Azerbaijan State University of Economics
- Awards: Taraggi Medal

Tahir Mirkishili (born 7 June 1977) is an Azerbaijani economist, politician, and a member of the Azerbaijani National Assembly for the 5th, 6th and 7th terms. He was born in Hamzali, Gubadlı district.

Mirkishili was elected to the National Assembly as the candidate of the New Azerbaijan Party from the 2nd electoral district no. 43. He is a member of the Committee on Economic Policy, Industry and Entrepreneurship.

== Early life ==
Mirkishili was born on 7 June 1977, in Gubadlı district. In 1994, he graduated from the number 1 physics-mathematics and informatics high school in Baku. He participated in the international Olympics as a member of the Azerbaijan national team in the field of mathematics. In 1994, he entered the Azerbaijan State University of Economics, Faculty of International Economic Relations, and graduated from this faculty with an honorary diploma in 1998.

In 1997, he ranked 1st among the requirements of higher education institutions in the "All Republic Economy Olympiads" organized by the Ministry of National Education of the Republic of Azerbaijan.

In 2000, he received a master's degree in international economics from the Azerbaijan State University of Economics. In 2006, he successfully defended his candidate thesis on "Foreign trade policy of the Republic of Azerbaijan and ways to improve it" and received the title of Doctor of Philosophy (Ph.D.) in the field of Economic Sciences.

Mirkishili speaks English, Russian and German. He is married and has two children.

== Activity ==
Mirkishili worked as a World Trade Organization expert at the Ministry of Foreign Economic Relations of the Republic of Azerbaijan in 1998, taught "World Economy" at the Azerbaijan State University of Economics between 2000 and 2006, and worked in various positions in the field of Information Communication Technologies in the private sector between 1999-2006 and 2011. In 2011, he was appointed as Innovations Advisor to the Minister of Economic Development of the Republic of Azerbaijan. He is a first class officer.

In 2012, BİT was also awarded the "Progress" medal by the President of Azerbaijan for its services.

In 2015, he was elected as a deputy to the National Assembly from the 42nd Sumgayit 2nd constituency. He was a member of the National Assembly's Economic Policy, Industry and Entrepreneurship Commission and th

In 2020, he was re-elected as a member of the National Assembly from the 42nd Sumgayit 2nd electoral district. He was the Chairman of the Economic Policy, Industry and Entrepreneurship Commission of the National Assembly. He was a member of the delegation at the OSCE Parliamentary Assembly,

In 2024, he was re-elected as a member of the National Assembly from the 43rd Sumgayit 2nd electoral district. He is a member of the Economic Policy, Industry and Entrepreneurship Commission

He is chairman of the delegation at the Euronest Parliamentary Assembly and chairman of the Energy Security Committee.

New Azerbaijan Party VII. He was elected as a member of the YAP Board of Directors at the Congress (5 March 2021).
