= Sabina Khasayeva =

Azerbaijani politician (born 1993)

- Səbinə Xasayeva (Azerbaijani)

Member of the National Assembly
- Incumbent
- Assumed office 10 March 2020
- Constituency: Garadagh-Binagadi-Yasamal

Personal details
- Born: Sabina Samad gizi Suleymanova; 30 March 1993 (age 33)
- Party: New Azerbaijan Party
- Education: Azerbaijan State Oil and Industry University; Azerbaijan University of Languages

Sabina Samad gizi Khasayeva (née Suleymanova; born 30 March 1993) is an Azerbaijani politician who has been a member of the National Assembly since 2020. She was the youngest MP elected at the 2020 Azerbaijani parliamentary election.

== Early life ==
Sabina Khasayeva was born on March 30, 1993. In 2010-2014, she received higher education in Scandinavian studies at Azerbaijan University of Languages. In 2016-2018, she received a master's degree in MBA at Azerbaijan State Oil and Industry University. She knows English and Norwegian.

=== Family ===
Sabina Khasayeva is married.

== Political Activity ==
In 2014 and 2019, Sabina Khasayeva was elected as a member of Lökbatan municipality from Garadagh-Binagadi-Yasamal District No. 12.

In the Parliamentary elections held on February 9, 2020, Sabina Khasayeva, the candidate of the New Azerbaijan Party (YAP) from the 12th Garadagh-Binagadi-Yasamal constituency, was elected to the 6th convocation of the National Assembly.

Sabina Khasayeva is a member of the Regional Affairs Committee of the National Assembly.
