= Fattah Heydarov =

Azerbaijani politician and legislator

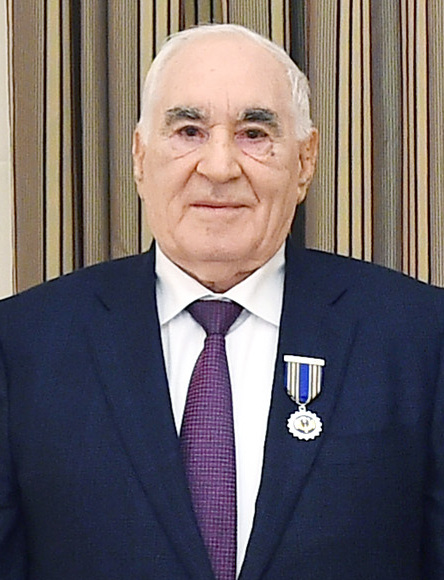

Deputy of the I-VI Meeting of the National Assembly of the Republic of Azerbaijan
- Incumbent
- Assumed office 1995–2020

Minister of Culture of Nakhchivan Autonomous Republic
- Incumbent
- Assumed office 1990–1995

Fəttah Səməd oğlu Heydərov (February 23, 1938, Chesemebasar, Nakhchivan region – August 4, 2020, Baku) was Deputy of the National Assembly of the Republic of Azerbaijan, chairman of the Accounting Committee of the National Assembly, deputy chairman of the Regional Affairs Committee, and chairman of the Council of Elders of Azerbaijan.

== Biography ==
Fattah Heydarov was born on February 23, 1938, in the Çeşemebasar village of Babek district of Nakhchivan, MR. He graduated from Nehram village secondary school in 1955, the mechanics and mathematics faculty of Azerbaijan State University in 1959–1964, and Baku Higher Party School in 1975.

He started his career in 1955 as the manager of Guznut village club in Babek district. Since 1958 he worked as a teacher at the Chesemebasar eight-year school, since 1968 he worked as an instructor of the Nakhchivan Provincial Party Committee, since 1970 he worked as the second secretary of the Ordubad District Party Committee, and in 1970-1990 he was elected as a member of parliament. Party Committee of Nakhchivan city and Ordubad district.

He worked as Minister of Home Affairs of Nakhchivan MSSC between 1976 and 1978.

He worked in Ordubad from 1978, as the First Secretary of the Julfa Regional Party Committee from 1986, and as the Minister of Culture of the Nakhchivan MR from 1983.

He served as a deputy of the Nakhchivan MR Supreme Soviet in 1990–1995. He served as a deputy of the National Assembly at the I (1995), II (2000), III (2005), IV (2010), V (2015), VI (2020) meetings of the Republic of Azerbaijan. He served as Chairman of the Accounting Commission of the National Assembly, Deputy Chairman of the Regional Affairs Committee, and Chairman of the Council of Elders of Azerbaijan.

He died on August 4, 2020, and was buried in the First Street of Honor.

== Awards ==
He was awarded the Order of Honor of the USSR (1975) and a medal.

On February 20, 2008, Fettah Samad oglu Heydarov was awarded the Order of Victory for his active participation in the cultural and socio-political life of the Republic of Azerbaijan.

On February 22, 2013, Fettah Samad oglu Heydarov was awarded the "Shohrat Orden" for his active participation in the social and political life of the Republic of Azerbaijan.

On February 22, 2018, Fettah Samad oglu Heydarov was awarded the Order of Independence for his long-term influential activities in the social and political life of the Republic of Azerbaijan.
