= Sahin Ismayilov =

Member of the National Assembly of Azerbaijan

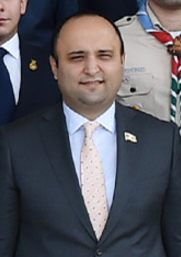

Member of the 6th National Assembly of Azerbaijan

Personal details
- Born: February 7, 1986 (age 39)
- Political party: New Azerbaijan Party
- Education: Azerbaijan University of Languages

İsmayilov Şahin Əmir oğlu (February 7, 1986, Yegegnadzor district) – deputy of the 5th and 6th convocation of the National Assembly of the Republic of Azerbaijan, deputy chairman of the Youth and Sports Committee of the National Assembly (2019 – until now), former president of the Union of Student Youth Organizations of Azerbaijan (2009– 2018), former member of the Agency for State Support to Non-Governmental Organizations (2012–2021), former member of the Azerbaijan Youth Fund Supervisory Board (2013– 2016)

== Biography ==
In 2002–2004, he was the chairman of the Student Committee of the secondary school number 84 in the Amirjan settlement of Surakhani district of Baku. He completed his undergraduate studies in French at the Faculty of Regional Studies and International Relations in 2004–2008. She received a master's degree in the same specialty from the Azerbaijan University of Languages in 2008–2010. She graduated from both levels of education with honors. In 2011, he was accepted into the ASU Social Psychology PhD program. She is currently studying in this program.

She speaks English, Russian, French and German.

He is married and has two children.

== Socio-political activity ==
New Azerbaijan Party VII. He was elected as a member of the YAP board of directors at the Congress (March 5, 2021).
