= Kamila Aliyeva =

Azerbaijani politician (born 1967)

- Born: Kamila Ali aga gizi Aliyeva; June 8, 1967 (age 58); Baku, Azerbaijan
- Occupation: politician

Kamila Ali aga gizi Aliyeva (born 8 June 1967) is an Azerbaijani politician. She is a member of the National Assembly of Azerbaijan, having served in the 4th, 5th, and 6th convocations.

== Early life and education ==
Kamilə Aliyeva was born on June 8, 1967, in Baku, Azerbaijan. She received her higher education at the Azerbaijan State University, named after S. Kirov (now known as Baku State University).

== Political career ==
Kamila Aliyeva was first elected to the Parliament of Azerbaijan at the 2010 parliamentary election. She ran as a candidate from the New Azerbaijan Party (YAP) and won the seat for the 111th Zaqatala-Balakən district.

In November 2015, she was re-elected for the 5th convocation of the National Assembly, once again representing the 111th Zaqatala district as the candidate of YAP.

== Awards ==
- “100th Anniversary of Azerbaijan Democratic Republic” Commemorative Medal (May 27, 2019)
