= Elman Nasirov =

Azerbaijani political scientist and political commentator (born 1968)

- Azerbaijani: Elman Xudam oğlu Nəsirov
- Born: 23 May 1968 (age 58); Baku, Azerbaijan SSR, Soviet Union
- Citizenship: Azerbaijan
- Awards: Taraggi Medal
- Scientific career
- Fields: International relations

Elman Nasirov (Azerbaijani: Elman Xudam oğlu Nəsirov) — Azerbaijani political scientist, political commentator, deputy of the National Assembly of Azerbaijan, Director of the Institute for Political Studies at the Academy of Public Administration of Azerbaijan.

== Biography ==
In 1989-1994 he received higher education at the History faculty of Baku State University (BSU) and graduated from the university with a diploma of distinction. In 1995-2000, the dissertation of the department of new and modern history of the countries of Europe and America, BSU. In parallel, 1995–2003, he worked at the Department of New and Contemporary History of the Countries of Europe and America at the Belarusian State University, where in 2001 he defended his dissertation on the topic “Azerbaijan-American Relations: 1991-1997” and received a doctorate in history.

In 2011, he defended his doctoral dissertation on the theme "The United States and the problems of international terrorism" and received a doctorate in political sciences. In 2012, he received the academic title of professor at the Department of International Relations and Foreign Policy of the Academy of Public Administration under the President of the Republic of Azerbaijan.

In 2004, he joined the editorial board of the scientific and practical journal "Public Administration: Fundamentals and Practice" and in 2012 became the executive secretary of this journal. In 2012, he joined the editorial board of the scientific and analytical journal "Geopolitics" of the Republic of Romania.

Since 2007, an expert of the Expert Council of Political and Historical Sciences of the Higher Attestation Commission under the President of the Republic of Azerbaijan.

In the period 2008-2013, he held the position of Deputy Director of the Geostrategic Research Center of the Academy of Public Administration under the President of the Republic of Azerbaijan. Since September 18, 2013, Director of the Institute for Political Studies of the Academy of Public Administration under the President of the Republic of Azerbaijan.

== Books ==
- Azerbaijan-US relations. 1991-1997 years. Baku, Qanun, 1998, 136 p.;
- Azerbaijani oil and international agreements. 1991-1999 years. Baku, Qanun, 1999, 104 p.
- USA and the world after September 11. Baku, Adiloglu, 2003, 262 p.
- The anti-terrorist doctrine of the United States of America and its implementation mechanisms. Baku, Elm və təhsil, 2010, 392 p.
- Succession, innovation and dynamism in public administration. Chronicle of Ilham Aliyev's presidential activity: an overview of official receptions and visits (2003-2006). Book I (co-author) Baku, Azərbaycan nəşriyyatı, 2007, 944 p.
- Succession, innovation and dynamism in Public Administration. Chronicle of Ilham Aliyev's presidential activity: overview of official receptions and visits (2007-2008) Book II (co-author) Baku, Azərbaycan nəşriyyatı, 2007, 754 p.
- USA and the problem of international terrorism. 2001–2010 years. Baku, "TEAS Press" publishing house, 2018, 344 p.
