= Mader Moussayev =

Azerbaijani politician (1947–2023)

Member of the National Assembly of Azerbaijan
- In office 26 November 1995 – 14 July 2023
- Constituency: Binagadi third electoral district No. 10

Personal details
- Born: Mader Alasgar oghlu Moussayev; 26 November 1947 Baku, Azerbaijan SSR, USSR
- Died: 14 July 2023 (aged 75)
- Party: CPSU (until 1991); Independent (1991–2023)
- Education: Moscow Cooperative Institute - Baku
- Occupation: Businessman

Mader Alasgar oghlu Moussayev (Azerbaijani: Madər Ələsgər oğlu Musayev; 26 November 1947 – 14 July 2023) was an Azerbaijani businessman and politician. An independent, he served in the National Assembly from 1995 to 2023.

Moussayev died on 14 July 2023, at the age of 75.
