= Mirmövsüm Kamil oğlu Abbasov =

Azerbaijani politician (1955–2010)

Abbasov Mirmövsüm Kamil oğlu
- Mirmövsüm Abbasov
- President: Ilham Aliyev

Personal details
- Died: April 22, 2010
- Political party: New Azerbaijan Party
- As of November 12, 2000

Mirmovsum Abbasov (October 3, 1955, in Gubakhalilli, Ismayilli district – April 22, 2010) was a deputy of the second convocation of the National Assembly of the Republic of Azerbaijan.

== Early life ==
He was born on October 3, 1955, in Gubakhalilli village of İsmayilli district. He graduated from the cultural and educational faculty of the Azerbaijan State Institute of Arts, the economic faculty of the agro-industrial complex of the Azerbaijan Agricultural Institute and the Baku Higher Party School. He speaks Russian. married. He had 2 children and died on April 22, 2010.

== Political activity ==
He was the chairman of the Ismayilli district organization of the New Azerbaijan Party. He was elected as a member of parliament from İsmailli Constituency No. 69 on November 5, 2000. He was a member of the Standing Committee on Agricultural Policy of the National Assembly.

== See also ==
Decree No. 994 of the President of the Republic of Azerbaijan, Appointment of M. K. Abbasov as head of the Executive Power of the Oghuz District Baku city, July 25, 2002, Mirmovsum Kamil oglu Abbasov will be appointed head of the Executive Power of the Oghuz District.
