= Sabir Rustamkhanli =

Azerbaijani poet & politician (born 1946)

- Sabir Rüstəmxanlı
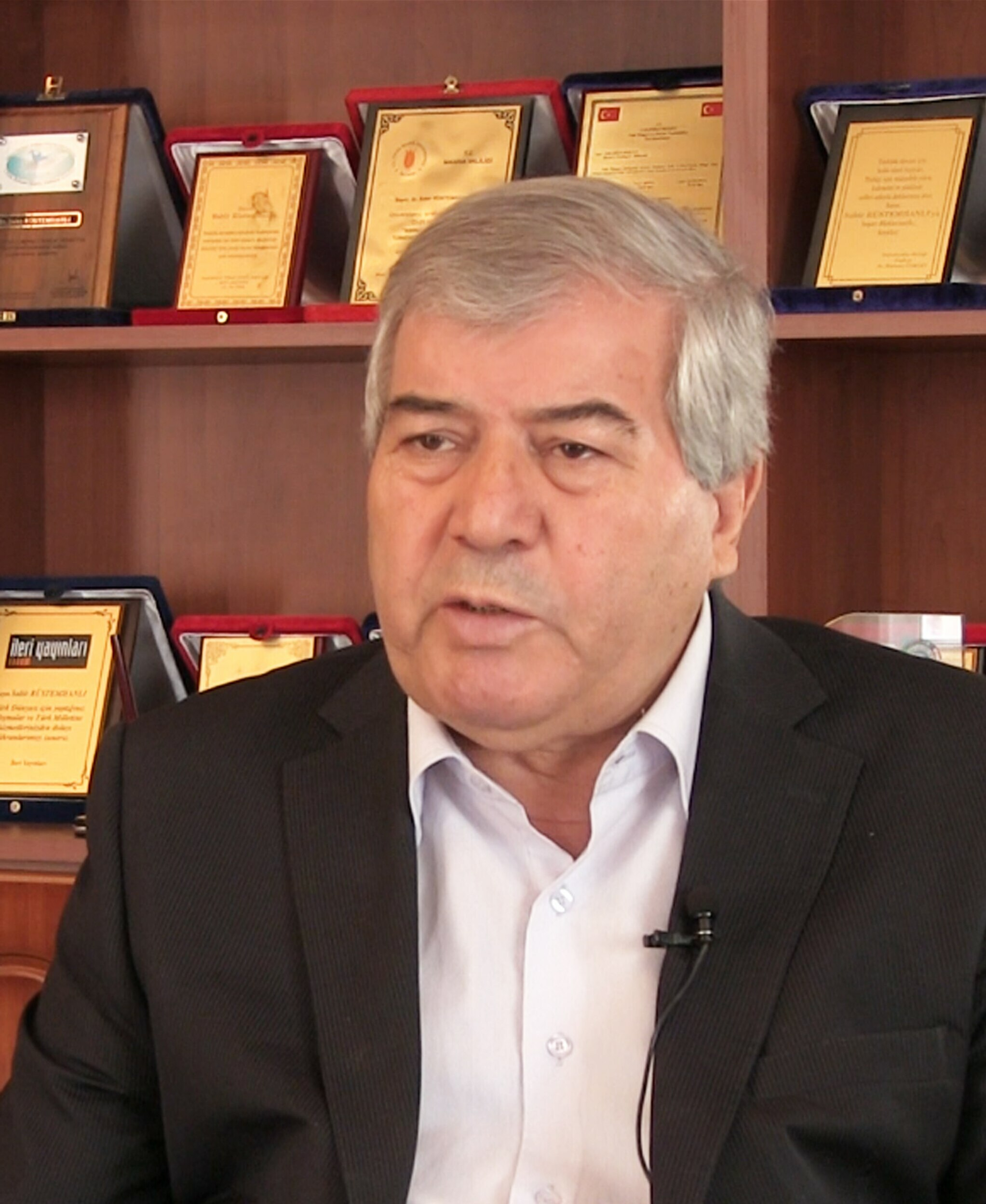
- Rustamkhanli in 2016

Chairman of the Civic Solidarity Party
- Incumbent
- Assumed office 26 September 1992
- Preceded by: Position established

Personal details
- Born: Sabir Khudu oğlu Rustamkhanli; 20 May 1946 Yardimli Rayon, Azerbaijan SSR, USSR
- Citizenship: Azerbaijan
- Party: Civic Solidarity Party
- Spouse: Tənzilə Rüstəmxanlı
- Children: 3
- Parent: Khudu
- Education: Baku State University

Sabir Rustamkhanli (Azerbaijani: Sabir Xudu oğlu Rüstəmxanlı; 20 May 1946) is an Azerbaijani poet, philologist and politician. He is the author of over 30 books in the Russian and Persian languages.

Sabir Rustamkhanli is chairman of the Assembly of the World Congress of Azerbaijanis, leader of the Civic Solidarity Party and member of the National Assembly of Azerbaijan.

Sabir Rustamkhanli was born in Hamarkand village of Yardimli. In 1963, he graduated from the Yardimli settlement eleven-year school. He entered the faculty of philology of the Azerbaijan State University, where he graduated in 1968 with honors.

On May 19, 2026, S. Rustamkhanly was awarded the "Sharaf" order for great contributions to the development of Azerbaijani literature.
