= Kamran Bayramov =

Azeri politician

Member of Azerbaijan Parliament
- Incumbent
- Assumed office February 9, 2020

Personal details
- Born: 10 November 1979 (age 46)
- Party: New Azerbaijan Party

Kamran Bayramov is a member of the National Assembly of Azerbaijan.

== Life ==
Kamran Bayramov was born on 10 November 1979 in Baku. He graduated from high school № 20 of Yasamal district of Baku in 1995, at the same year he entered the law faculty of Baku State University. After graduating from this University in 1999, he received a bachelor's degree in law. In 2008 he entered the magistracy of the Baku State University and in 2011 he graduated from magistracy of the law faculty with honors.

In 2014 he entered the magistracy of the Academy of Public Administration under the President of the Republic of Azerbaijan to pursue the degree in public and municipal administration, in 2016 he graduated from this educational institution with honors.

Married with three children.

== Career ==
- In 1999, Kamran Bayramov was hired by the Ministry of Justice and appointed to the position of inspector of Department of International Legal Cooperation at the central office of the Ministry;
- In 1999–2006 he worked as an inspector, consultant, leading consultant, senior consultant of the Department of International Legal Cooperation of the Ministry of Justice;
- In September 2006, Kamran Bayramov was appointed Deputy Director of the Department for Human Rights and Public Relations of the Ministry of Justice;
- In May 2007, he moved to the Executive Office of the President of the Republic of Azerbaijan and was appointed to the position of consultant of the Department of Legislation and Legal Expertise Issues of the Executive Office;
- In 2007–2013, he worked at the Department of Legislation and Legal Expertise Issues of the Executive Office of the President of the Republic of Azerbaijan, reaching the position of senior consultant;
- In February 2013, Kamran Bayramov was appointed to the position of Director of Division for Work with Municipalities of the Department of Regional Governance and Work with Local Self-Government Authorities of the Administration of President of the Republic of Azerbaijan;
- Following the elections to Milli Majlis held on 1 November 2015, Kamran Bayramov was elected a member of parliament (Milli Majlis) of the Republic of Azerbaijan of V convocation from Shamkir-Dashkasan constituency №100;
- Following early elections to Milli Majlis held on 9 February 2020, Kamran Bayramov was re-elected a member of parliament (Milli Majlis) of the Republic of Azerbaijan of VI convocation from Shamkir-Dashkasan constituency №100;

Kamran Bayramov is a member of the Regional Affairs Committee and Committee on Foreign and Interparliamentary Relations of Milli Majlis. He is a head of Azerbaijan-Latvia working group of inter-parliamentary relations, a member of working groups of inter-parliamentary relations with Argentina, Belarus, France, Croatia, Spain, Canada, Korea, Cuba, Qatar, Lithuania, Poland, Ukraine.

Kamran Bayramov is a member of delegations of Azerbaijan to the Inter-Parliamentary Union and NATO Parliamentary Assembly.
