= Javanshir Feyziyev =

Azerbaijani scholar and politician (born 1963)

Javanshir Feyziyev Member of the National Assembly of Azerbaijan
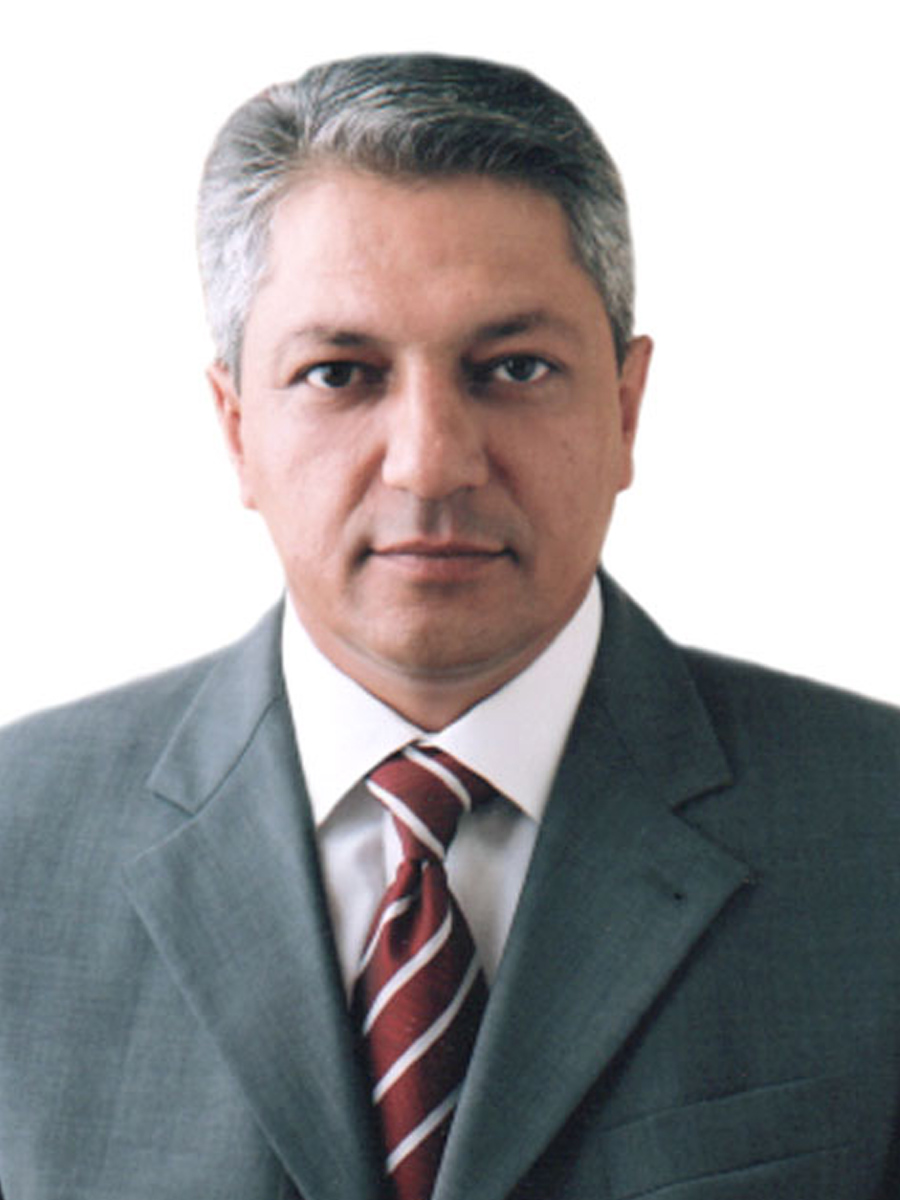

Member of the Azerbaijan Parliament for Shaki
- Incumbent
- Assumed office 2010
- Preceded by: new constituency

Personal details
- Born: 12 July 1963 (age 63) Boyuk Dehna, Shaki, Azerbaijan
- Education: Pedagogical University of Foreign Languages
- Profession: Translation and Interpreting
- Website: http://javanshir.feyziyev.com/

Javanshir Feyziyev (Azerbaijani: Cavanşir Feyziyev) (born on 12 July 1963, Shaki, Azerbaijan) is a Member of the National Assembly of Azerbaijan (V convocation), Member of the Committee on Cultural issues, and the Committee on İnternational and İnterparliamentary Relations.

== Early life and education ==
Javanshir Feyziyev was born 12 July 1963 in the village Boyuk Dehna in Shaki, Azerbaijan. He went to Secondary School in Boyuk Dehna between 1970 and 1977 and later continued his education at the math-oriented boarding school in Turan settlement from 1977 to 1980. He was drafted to military service in Kazakhstan serving from 1983 to 1985.

Feyziyev studied at the faculty of Translation and Interpretation of the Pedagogical University of Foreign Languages, and graduated the university as an interpreter and teacher with the diploma with distinction. He worked as a Professor at the Department of Translation and Interpretation of the Pedagogical University of Foreign Languages from 1992 to 1994. He then joined the medical humanitarian organization Médecins Sans Frontières (Doctors without Borders) in 1994 serving as a translator and administrator. From 1995 to 1998, he was the Head of the Department in the Caucasus representative office of the USA headquartered Philip Morris Company. He was also the founder and director of the «Planet Co. Ltd» company. From 2002 to 2010 he worked as a Co-founder and General Director of AvroMed Company. Feyziyev was also the founder of «Tour-Invest» company, and the founder and chief editor of «Discovery Azerbaijan» popular science journals. In 2013 he was elected to the Board of the Press Council of the Republic of Azerbaijan.

== Scientific activities ==
From 2004 to 2009, he was a PhD student at the Philosophy, Sociology and Law Institute of Azerbaijan National Academy of Sciences. In October 2009, he defended his dissertation on "Moral aspects of ethno-political conflicts" and received a PhD degree.

In 2002, his book titled "Ethno-political conflicts in the Caucasus and their impact on the state independence" was published in English. In 2008, his book titled "Peace Philosophy" and in 2013 the book titled "The Union of the Turkish States: the Eurasian Model of Global Integration" were translated into Azerbaijani and published. The book titled "The Union of the Turkish States: Eurasian Model of Global Integration" was translated into Turkish, Kazakh, Kyrgyz, Russian, Bosnian and Hungarian in 2014-2017 and published in abovementioned countries.

In 2015, he translated the book titled “Armenian tragedy in 1915” (French: La Tragédie Arménienne) by French historian Georges de Maleville, in 2016, the book titled “So You Don't Get Lost in the Neighborhood” (French: Pour que tu ne te perdes pas dans le quartier) by French novelist Patrick Modiano and in 2010 the book titled “A Big Heart” (French: Le Grand Cœur) by French novelist Jean-Christophe Rufin into Azerbaijani.

In 2017, his 5 volume book collection titled Turkic world was published:

- "Basic values of the Turkic world";
- "Turkic peoples";
- "History of Turkish statehood";
- "Turkish studies ";
- "Historical figures of the Turkic world".

More than 60 scientific articles have been published in various Azerbaijani, Turkish, Ukrainian and Russian scientific publications. He is the author of more than 100 historical, social and political articles published in periodicals in Azerbaijan, Turkey, Ukraine, Russia, Serbia, France, United States and Pakistan. He can speak in Azerbaijani, Russian, Turkish, French and English fluently.

== Political career ==
Javanshir Feyziyev served as an MP from Shaki constituency from 2010 to 2015. He is the member of the International and Interparliamentary Relations Committee and Committee on Cultural issues of the National Assembly of the Republic of Azerbaijan.

Feyziyev was the member of working groups of the National Assembly of Azerbaijan with France, Switzerland, Great Britain and Hungary and the head of the Azerbaijan-Uruguay Interparliamentary Friendship Group.

He is currently serving as an MP from Shaki constituency from 2015. He is the head of the interparliamentary working groups of the UK - Azerbaijan and France - Azerbaijan. He holds the various positions in the National Assembly of Azerbaijan. Feyziyev is also the member of the working groups between the National Assembly of the Republic of Azerbaijan and the parliaments of Switzerland, Hungary, Bosnia-Herzegovina, Kyrgyzstan and Japan and member of the delegation group of National Assembly of Azerbaijan in the Parliamentary Assembly of the Turkic Speaking Countries .

Feyziyev is the member of the delegation group of the National Assembly of Azerbaijan at the Euronest Parliamentary Assembly. He is also the Co-chair of the EU-Azerbaijan Parliamentary Cooperation Committee since January 2017.

== Social activities ==
Feyziyev is the founder and editor-in-chief of the "Discovery Azerbaijan" scientific magazine since 2005. He is the co-founder of the "Azerbaijan-Kazakhstan Friendship Society" Public Union. Since 2010, he is a member of the Journalists Trade Union of Azerbaijan.

In 2013 and 2018 he was elected as a member of the Board of the Press Council of the Republic of Azerbaijan at the Congress of Azerbaijani Journalists. He is the Chairman of the International Relations Commission of the Press Council of the Republic of Azerbaijan.

In 2015, he was appointed the Honorary Ambassador of the city of Colmar of France in Azerbaijan. He is a member of the Union of Azerbaijani Writers since 2018.

=== Honors ===
- 2010 – “Qızıl Qələm” (Golden Pen) in 2010.
- 2010 – “Uğur” (Success) National Award. He was awarded with “Uğur” National Prize, in 2010, for the active participation in implementation of the State Program on Social and Economic Development of the Regions and for the achievements acquired.
- 2014 – Honorary Ambassador of the city of Colmar of France in Azerbaijan.
- 2016 – Golden Medal of the International Turkish Academy.
- 2016 – “25th anniversary of Independence of Republic of Kazakhstan” medal, with the order of the President of the Republic of Kazakhstan in 2016.
- 2018 – Turkic World Honor medal

== See also ==
- National Assembly of Azerbaijan
