= Malahat Ibrahimgizi =

Azerbaijani politician (born 1958)

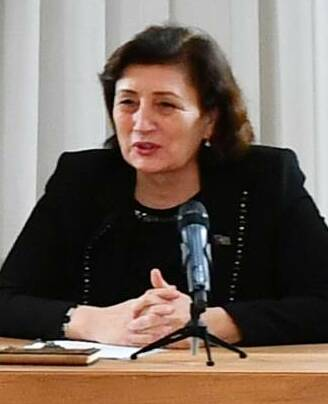

Malahat Ibrahimgizi (born 25 April 1958) is an Azerbaijani politician. She has been a member of the National Assembly. She has served as a member of the NATO Parliamentary Assembly since 2006 and is a member of the Euronest Parliamentary Assembly.

== Early life ==
She was born in Vardenis district in the Armenian Soviet Socialist Republic.
