= Agil Abbas =

Azerbaijani writer

Agil Magomed oğlu Abbas (Azerbaijani: Aqil Məhəmməd oğlu Abbasov) is a deputy of National Assembly of Azerbaijan and a member of Azerbaijan Writers Union since 1986.

== Biography ==
Abbas was born in Kolalı, Agjabadi on 1 April 1953. In 1955, when he was two years old, he moved to Aghdam together with his family and lived there. He continued his education on the faculty of philology in Azerbaijan University of Languages after finishing secondary school N1 in Aghdam.(1970–1976.) He began his working activity as a teacher at a boarding-school in Agsu, worked as a newspaper photographer and departmental manager at the "Science and Life" journal. Currently, he is an editor-in chief at the Justice and Grey Wolf newspaper. He was elected the deputy of National Assembly of Azerbaijan Republic in 2005.

== Creativity ==
He began his literary creativity in the 1970s, his first published work was "Sweetness" (Shirinlik) which was printed by Literature and Art (Ədəbiyyat və incəsənət) newspaper. Systematically, "Star" (Ulduz) and "Mockery Nazim" (Şəbədə Nazim) appeared in the journal Azerbaijan in 1977. Since that time, he has appeared in the media regularly. He is an author of narratives such as "Day of judgement" (Qiyamət gecəsi) and "Black Long Hair" (Qapqara uzun saçlar). He had created many samples of prose on war, the village themes.

== Works ==
- The Happiest Man
- Batmanqılınj
- Black Long Hair
- Judgement Night
- A Way that Does Not Lead to Shusha

== Awards ==
- Komsomol Prize (1987)
- Golden Pen of the Azerbaijan Journalists Union
- Mammad Araz Award
