= Fazail Ibrahimli =

Azerbaijani politician (born 1951)

Deputy Speaker of the National Assembly
- Incumbent
- Assumed office 10 March 2020 Serving with Adil Aliyev
- Speaker: Sahiba Gafarova

Member of the National Assembly for Jalilabad-Masalli-Bilasuvar
- Incumbent
- Assumed office 2 December 2005
- Preceded by: Mirmövsüm Kamil oğlu Abbasov

Member of the National Assembly for the VHP party list
- In office 12 November 2000 – 2 December 2005

Personal details
- Born: 12 April 1951 (age 75) Chanagbulag, Yardımlı, Azerbaijan
- Party: Civil Solidarity Party
- Education: Azerbaijan State Pedagogical University, Baku State University
- Occupation: Politician, Professor

Fazail Ibrahimli (born 12 April 1951) is an Azerbaijani politician who has served as Deputy Speaker of the National Assembly of Azerbaijan since 2020.

Ibrahimli has served as a member of parliament for four consecutive terms since 2000.

He was born in Chanagbulag, Yardımlı. He attended Azerbaijan State Pedagogical University and received a degree in history. Later, he joined Baku State University and worked there as a student between 1979 and 1982.

In 1982, he joined the faculty of Baku State University and has served as a professor of history at the university.

In 1992, he joined the Civil Solidarity Party, which he currently serves as Vice Chairman.

== Awards ==
- Shohrat Order
