= Nagif Hamzayev =

Azerbaijani politician (born 1983)

Nagif Hamzayev Naqif Həmzəyev

Deputy of National Assembly of Azerbaijan
- Incumbent
- Assumed office 2015, 2020
- President: Ilham Aliyev
- Preceded by: Asef Hajiyev

Personal details
- Born: 24 May 1983 (age 42) Narimanli, Vardenis District, Armenian SSR, Soviet Union

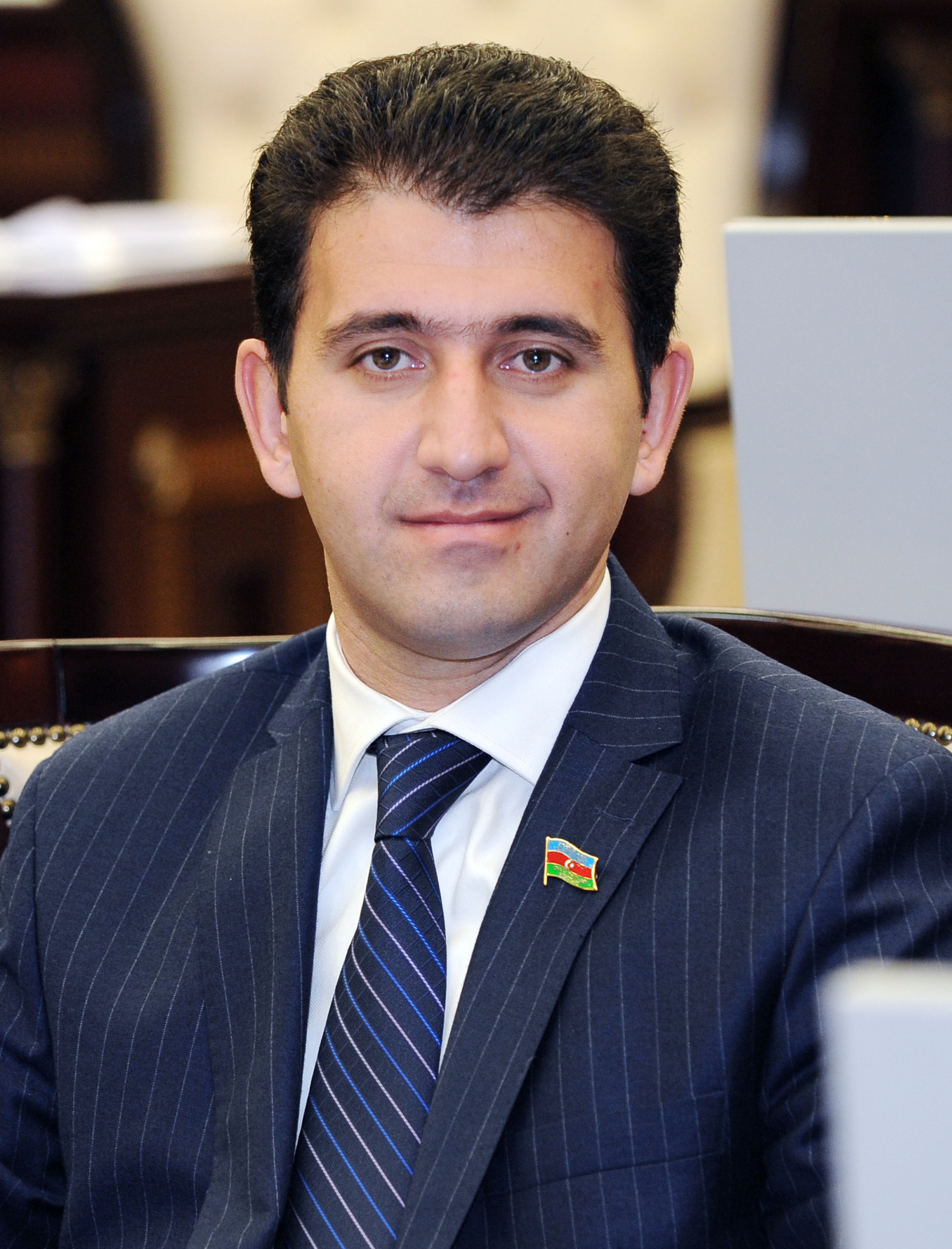

Nagif Alashraf oglu Hamzayev (Azerbaijani: Naqif Ələşrəf oğlu Həmzəyev) has been a Deputy in the National Assembly of Azerbaijan since 2015 and since 2020. He is an Azerbaijani politician and Chairman of the New Azerbaijan Party (NAP) Ganja city organization.

== Biography ==
Nagif Hamzayev was born on May 24, 1983, in Narimanli, Vardenis, Armenian SSR. In 2000, he graduated from the secondary school number 2 named after Ahmad Javad in the city of Ganja.

In 2000, he entered the Baku State University History department. Since his university years, he was an active student in social activities. He is a co-founder of the association World Union of Azerbaijani Youth. Hamzayev participated in many international conferences and scientific events representing Azerbaijan.

Hamzayev continued his education at Baku State University (2004–2006) where he received his Master's Degree in History in 2006. From May to September 2009 he worked as a specialist in the Department of Information and Communication Technologies at Ganja State University.

From February 2009, he was a specialist in the Department of International Relations at the Azerbaijan State Agricultural University. From 2010 to 2011, he was a director at the Centre of Information and Communication Technologies at the Azerbaijan State Agricultural University.

In 2012, he entered the PhD program in History of the Faculty of Social Sciences Institute at Firat University in Turkey.

== Political career ==
From 2013 to 2014, he was the Deputy Head of the Executive Power of Kapaz District of Ganja city. On August 1, 2013, he was elected Chairman in the 8th conference of the New Azerbaijan Party Ganja city organization.

On March 19, 2015, he was elected First Deputy Head of the Executive Power of Ganja city. On October 1, 2015, he was elected a Deputy of Milli Mejlis of the Republic of Azerbaijan.

On February 9, 2020, he was elected Deputy of the Milli Majlis of the Republic of Azerbaijan for the VI convocation. Currently, Hamzayev is the chairman of the New Azerbaijan Party (NAP) Ganja city organization.

He is a member of the Milli Mejlis Committee on Human Rights and Committee on Natural Resources, Energy and Ecology. Also, he is a representative for the inter-parliamentary friendship groups Azerbaijan–Israel, Azerbaijan–China, Azerbaijan–Georgia, Azerbaijan–Kazakhstan, Azerbaijan–Czech, Azerbaijan–India, Azerbaijan–Korea, Azerbaijan–Turkey, Azerbaijan–Ukraine, Azerbaijan–Hungary, Azerbaijan–Sweden, Azerbaijan–Portugal, and Azerbaijan–Slovenia.

From May 2018, he has been a member of the Azerbaijan delegation to the Parliamentary Assembly of the Council of Europe.

Nagif Hamzayev is fluent in Azerbaijani, English, Russian, and Turkish.

== Personal life ==
Nagif Hamzayev is married and has two children.

== See also ==
- 2020 Azerbaijani parliamentary election
