= Emin Hajiyev =

Member of the 6th National Assembly of Azerbaijan

Personal details
- Born: 13 February 1982 (age 43)
- Political party: New Azerbaijan Party
- Education: Azerbaijan State University of Economics
- Awards: Taraggi Medal

Emin Hacıyev (born 13 February 1982) is an Azerbaijani deputy who participated in the 6th meeting of the National Assembly of the Republic of Azerbaijan.

== Education ==
Emin Hajiyev was born in Sumgait. He graduated from the Azerbaijan State University of Economics in 2002 (bachelor's degree), and in 2004 (master's degree). In 2008, he successfully defended his candidate thesis on "The formation and development of mortgage loans in Azerbaijan" at the Azerbaijan Architecture and Construction University and received the title of Doctor of Philosophy in the field of Economic Sciences. He then received a master's degree at the Diplomatic Academy of the Russian Ministry of Foreign Affairs in 2013–2015.

== Socio-political activity ==
In 2006, he worked as a leading consultant at the Ministry of Economic Development. Since 2007, he has worked as an employee of the General Consulate of the Republic of Azerbaijan in St. Petersburg, and in 2009–2020, he worked as a member of the board of the Azerbaijani Youth Union of Russia and as the responsible secretary. During his activities in Azerbaijan and Russia, he acted as the initiator and executor of the organization of important projects and events, as well as took important steps in conveying the truths of Azerbaijan to the Russian public.

In the parliamentary elections held on February 9, 2020, Sumgayit No. 43 nominated his candidacy from the 3rd electoral district and was elected as the 6th convocation deputy of the Milli Majlis of the Republic of Azerbaijan after receiving 63.5% of votes.

He is the chairman of the Working Group on Azerbaijan-Nigeria Inter-Parliamentary Relations.

== Awards ==
In 2016, he was awarded the "Taraggi Medal" by the President of the Republic of Azerbaijan, Ilham Aliyev, for his services to the strengthening of friendship between peoples and the development of the Azerbaijani diaspora.
