= Samad Seyidov =

Azerbaijani politician (born 1964)

Samad Seyidov Səməd Seyidov
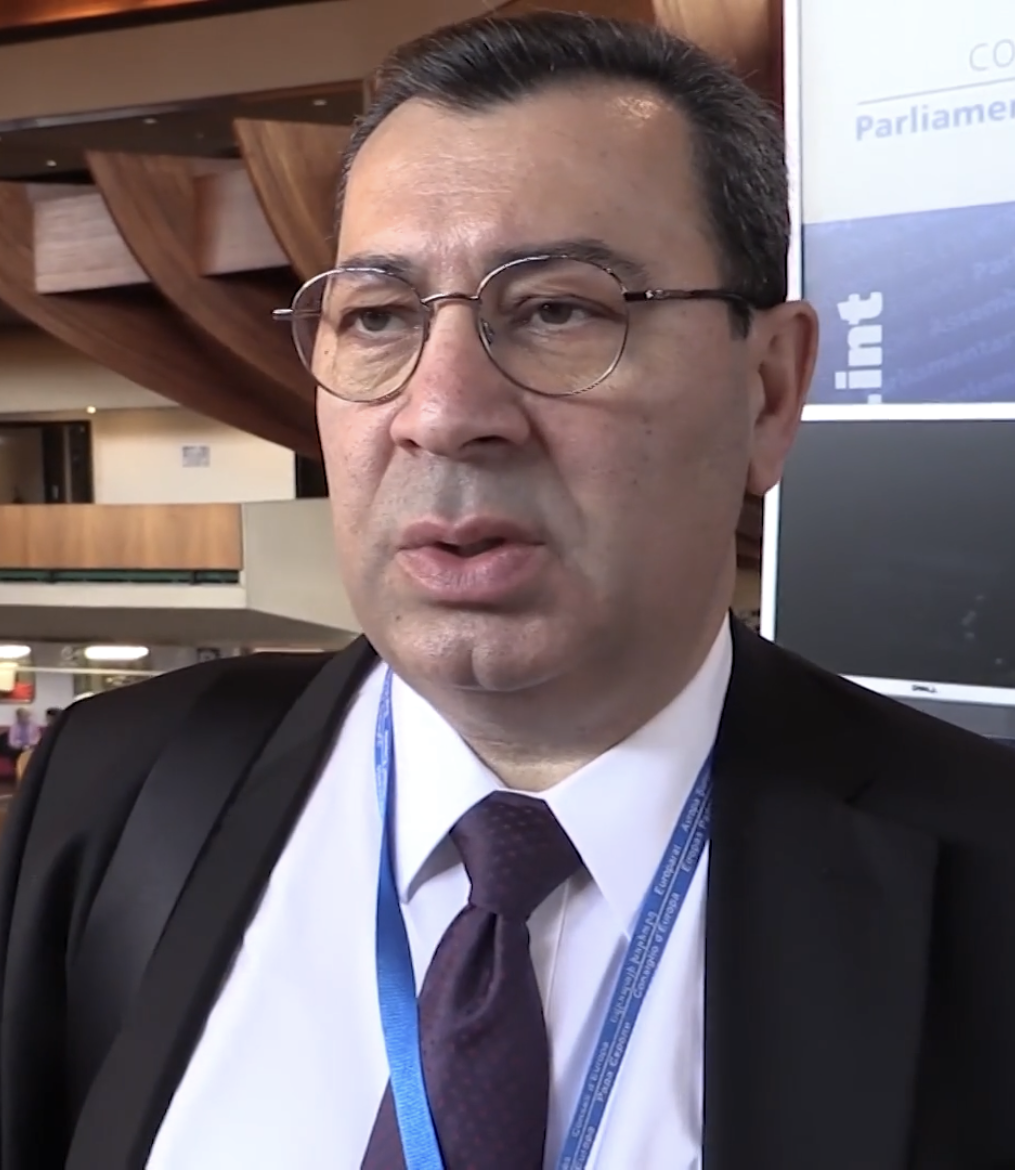
- Samad Seyidov in 2020.

Member of National Assembly of Azerbaijan for 36th Khatai district
- Incumbent
- Assumed office November 6, 2005
- President: Ilham Aliyev
- Preceded by: Unknown

Personal details
- Born: January 18, 1964 (age 62) Baku, Azerbaijan

Samad Seyidov Ismayil oglu (Azerbaijani: Səməd Seyidov İsmayıl oğlu; born on January 18, 1964) is a professor and an Azerbaijani politician who serves as the Member of National Assembly of Azerbaijan from the 36th Khatai electoral district.

== Early life ==
Seyidov was born on January 18, 1964, in Baku, Azerbaijan. He graduated from Psychology Studies Department of Saint Petersburg State University in Russia. Starting from 1986, he worked at Azerbaijan University of Languages as lab assistant, senior lab assistant, senior professor, vice-rector for education issues. In 2000, he was appointed Rector of the Azerbaijan University of Languages. He is member of International Association for Analytical Psychology As the rector of university he has established close ties with universities abroad.

== Political career ==
Seyidov was elected member of parliament during 2000 parliamentary elections to the National Assembly. He was re-elected from Khatai district of Baku on November 6, 2005, during the 2005 parliamentary elections. He was also elected Chairman of International and Interparliamentary Relations Committee of Azerbaijani Parliament. Seyidov also chairs Azerbaijan-US Interparliamentary Relations Working Group and is a member of Azerbaijan-Kazakhstan and Azerbaijan-Saudi Arabia interparliamentary working groups. He is member of New Azerbaijan Party.

Seyidov chairs the Azerbaijani delegation to Parliamentary Assembly of the Council of Europe (PACE) which consists of 12 members of parliament. He has been a member of the assembly since January 22, 2001. Seyidov is a member of Committee on Economic Affairs and Development, Committee on Migration, Refugees and Population, Committee on the Honouring of Obligations and Commitments by Member States of the Council of Europe (Monitoring Committee), Political Affairs Committee, Sub-Committee on conflict prevention through dialogue and reconciliation and Sub-Committee on External Relations. He currently acts as co-rapporteur of the Parliamentary Assembly of the Council of Europe (PACE) for the monitoring of Serbia,

== PACE Corruption ==
In 2018 the Parliamentary Assembly of Europe (PACE) announced sanctions against Samad Seyidov for his involvement in the corruption scandal, known as Caviar diplomacy and Azerbaijani laundromat, revealed by the PACE after an investigation. The report said that Baku bribed assembly members to get them to lobby its interests in the organization.

== Personal life ==
Samed Seyidov is fluent in English and Russian. He is married and has two children.

== Awards ==
- Legion of Honour, of the third degree (Chevalier) – 2011
- Medal "90th anniversary of the diplomatic service of the Republic of Azerbaijan (1919-2009)" – 2018
- Azerbaijan Democratic Republic 100th anniversary medal – 2019
- Shohrat Order – 2024
