= Azay Guliyev =

- Azay Əjdər oğlu Quliyev
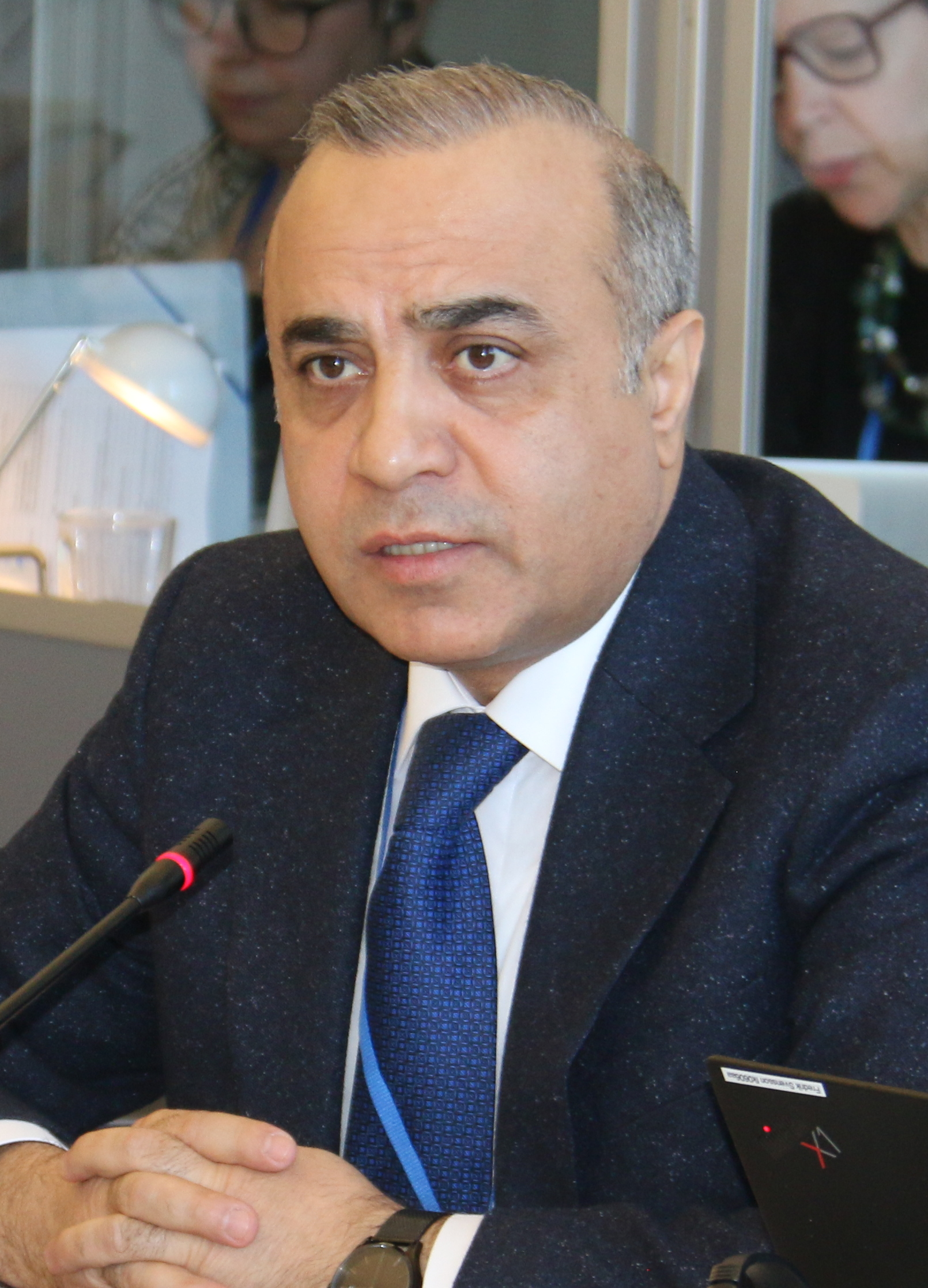
- Guliyev in 2024

Chair of the OSCE Parliamentary Assembly General Committee on Economic Affairs, Science, Technology and Environment
- Incumbent
- Assumed office 2022

Chair of the OSCE PA Silk Road Group
- Incumbent
- Assumed office 2017

Vice-President of the OSCE Parliamentary Assembly
- In office 2016–2022

Head of the Azerbaijani Delegation to the OSCE Parliamentary Assembly
- In office 2020–2024

Member of the Milli Majlis
- Incumbent
- Assumed office 2005
- Constituency: Shirvan No. 46 (2005–2015); Binagadi First No. 8 (2015–present)

Personal details
- Born: June 23, 1971 (age 55) Vaghudi village, Garakilsa (Sisian) district, Western Azerbaijan (present-day Armenia)
- Party: Independent
- Education: Baku State University
- Occupation: Politician

Dr. Azay Guliyev (born 1971) is the Chair of the OSCE Parliamentary Assembly General Committee on Economic Affairs, Science, Technology and Environment, Chair of the Silk Road Support Group within the OSCE PA, Coordinator of the Baku Parliamentary Platform for Dialogue and Cooperation, Head of Delegation of Azerbaijan to the OSCE PA (2020-2024) and the Member of Parliament of the Republic of Azerbaijan.

== General information ==
Date of Birth: 23 June 1971

Place of Birth: Vaghudi village, Garakilsa (Sisian) district, Western Azerbaijan (present-day Armenia)

Academic Degree: Doctor of Philosophy (PhD) in Political Science

Languages: Azerbaijani, English and Russian

Marital Status: Married, father of three children.

== Education ==
1978–1988 – Completed secondary education at Vaghudi Village Secondary School.

1989–1991 – Completed compulsory military service.

1992–1998 – Graduated with honours from the Faculty of History of Baku State University.

1995–1996 – Completed the International Public Administration Programme at the Turkey and Middle East Public Administration Institute (TODAIE).

2007–2013 – Pursued doctoral studies at Baku State University.

2010 – Completed the "Strategic Management for NGO Leaders" Programme at Harvard University.

2013 – Awarded the academic degree of Doctor of Philosophy (PhD) in Political Science.

== Parliamentary activity ==
=== Member of the Milli Majlis (Parliament) of the Republic of Azerbaijan ===
3rd Convocation (2005–2010)

4th Convocation (2010–2015)

5th Convocation (2015–2020)

6th Convocation (2020–2024)

7th Convocation (2024–present)

=== Electoral Constituencies ===
2005 and 2010 – Shirvan Electoral Constituency No. 46

2015, 2020 and 2024 – Binagadi First Electoral Constituency No. 8

=== Positions Held in Parliament ===
Member of the Committee on Legal Policy and State Building

Member of the Committee on Public Associations and Religious Institutions

Head of the Azerbaijan–Romania Interparliamentary Working Group

Member of the Azerbaijan–Türkiye, Azerbaijan–Germany, Azerbaijan–United Kingdom, Azerbaijan–Spain, Azerbaijan–Italy, Azerbaijan–Czech Republic, Azerbaijan–Estonia, Azerbaijan–Austria, Azerbaijan–South Africa, Azerbaijan–Switzerland, Azerbaijan–Uzbekistan and other interparliamentary working groups.

== Legislative Activity ==
=== Laws Authored ===
2009 – Law of the Republic of Azerbaijan "On Voluntary Activity"

2013 – Law of the Republic of Azerbaijan "On Public Participation"

== International Activity ==
=== OSCE Parliamentary Assembly ===
Since 2005 – Member of the Azerbaijani Delegation to the OSCE Parliamentary Assembly

2013–2016 – Vice-Chair of the General Committee on Political Affairs and Security of the OSCE Parliamentary Assembly

2016–2022 – Vice-President of the OSCE Parliamentary Assembly

2017 – Founder and Chair of the OSCE PA Silk Road Group

2020–2024 – Head of the Azerbaijani Delegation to the OSCE Parliamentary Assembly

2021–2022 – OSCE PA Special Representative on South East Europe

Since 2022 – Chair of the General Committee on Economic Affairs, Science, Technology and Environment of the OSCE Parliamentary Assembly.

=== Election Observation Missions ===
Participated in election observation missions in more than 15 countries within the OSCE framework.

Including:

2016 – Head of the OSCE Parliamentary Assembly Delegation to observe the parliamentary elections in Montenegro

2016 – Head of the OSCE Parliamentary Assembly Delegation to observe the parliamentary elections in North Macedonia

2017 – Special Co-ordinator and Leader of the OSCE Short-Term Election Observation Mission for the presidential election in Kyrgyzstan

2021 – Special Co-ordinator and Leader of the OSCE Short-Term Election Observation Mission for the parliamentary elections in Albania

2024 – Special Co-ordinator and Leader of the OSCE Short-Term Election Observation Mission for the parliamentary elections in Uzbekistan

=== Euronest Parliamentary Assembly ===
2011-2014 – Vice-Chair of the Committee on Social Affairs, Education, Culture and Civil Society.

== International Parliamentary Initiatives ==
Resolutions authored in the OSCE Parliamentary Assembly:

2013 – "Strengthening Civil Society Institutions in the OSCE Region"

2014 – "Protection of Cultural Property in the OSCE Region"

2015 – "Commitment to the Helsinki Principles in Interstate Relations throughout the OSCE Area"

2018 – "Strengthening Connectivity in the OSCE Region through the Development of Transport Networks and Corridors"

== Public Service in State Institutions (on a voluntary basis) ==
1999–2025 – Member of the Supervisory Board of the Social Development Fund for Internally Displaced Persons under the Cabinet of Ministers

Since 2001 – Member of the Pardon Commission under the President of the Republic of Azerbaijan

2001–2003 – Expert of the Secretariat of the State Programme on Poverty Reduction and Economic Development

2005–2025 – Member of the State Commission on Prisoners of War, Hostages and Missing Persons

Since 2007 – Member of the Joint Working Group on Human Rights

2008–2021 – Chair of the Council on State Support to Non-Governmental Organizations under the President of the Republic of Azerbaijan

Since 2013 – Member of the State Commission on Cooperation between the Republic of Azerbaijan and the European Union

2021–2025 – Chair of the Supervisory Board of the Agency for State Support to Non-Governmental Organizations of the Republic of Azerbaijan

== Public Activity ==
1993–1998 – Chairman of the "Elite" Youth Club and the Azerbaijan Youth Union for Peace and Security Public Association

1998–1999 – Chairman of the National Assembly of Youth Organizations of the Republic of Azerbaijan

1999–2008 – President of the Azerbaijan National NGO Forum

Since 2012 – Chairman of the International Cooperation Centre Public Union

== Academic Activity ==
2013 – Defended his doctoral dissertation entitled "The Place of Non-Governmental Organizations in the Socio-Political System: National and International Experience" and obtained a PhD in Political Science.

2018 – Author of the monograph "Non-Governmental Organizations in Azerbaijan: History and Development".

Published more than 30 academic articles on civil society and public administration in scholarly journals in the United States, the United Kingdom, Ukraine, Georgia, Moldova, Russia and other countries.
