= Tahir Rzayev =

Deputy of the National Assembly of the Republic of Azerbaijan

Deputy of the II, III, IV, V and VI Meetings of the National Assembly of the Republic of Azerbaijan
- Incumbent
- Assumed office From 16 November 2001

Tahir Rzayev (born February 24, 1950, Ağcabedi) is a deputy of the National Assembly of the Republic of Azerbaijan for the II, III, IV, V and VI terms, a member of the Azerbaijan Writers' Union, and a doctor of philosophy in the field of philology.

== Biography ==
Tahir Rzayev was born on February 24, 1950, in the village of Khalfaraddin in Agcabadi district. He studied at the Faculty of Philology of Azerbaijan State University and Baku Higher Party School. He is a member of the Azerbaijan Writers' Union. He is the author of 20 books. He speaks Russian.

He worked as a worker in the construction departments of the Agcabadi region since 1970.

He is married and has three children.

== Socio-political activity ==
Tahir Rzayev has been a man of letters in the newspaper "Surat" published in Agjabedi district since 1971, the second secretary and first secretary of the district Komsomol Committee since 1977, and the instructor and first deputy chairman of the Agjabedi District Party Committee since 1982. He has served in the Ağcabedi District Executive Committee since 1987. He worked as the second secretary of the Ağcabedi District Party Committee.

Between 1989 and 1994, he worked as a worker in the district feed union, as a literary agent in the "Ulfat" newspaper, as head of department in the "Aran" newspaper, as deputy head of the Agcabedi District Executive Power in 1994–1999, as the head of the district in the Executive Power office, and as the chairman of the Agcabedi city municipality in 1999–2001. .

He is the chairman of the Azerbaijan-Qatar interparliamentary relations working group and chairs the Agricultural Policies Committee.

He is a member of the New Azerbaijan Party.

== Awards ==
He was awarded the "Order of Fame" in 2020.
