= Adil Aliyev =

Azerbaijani politician (born 1969)

- Adil Əliyev
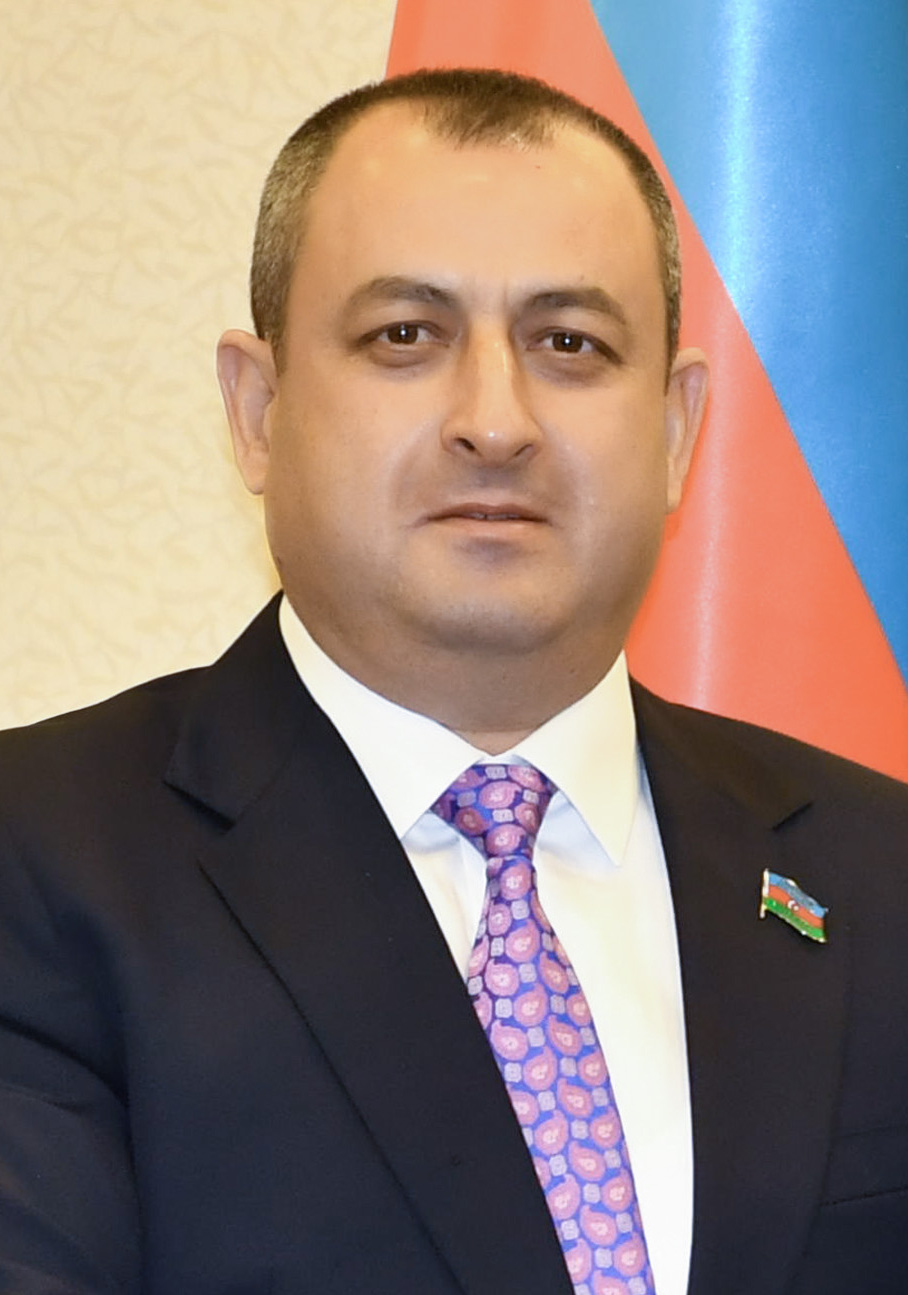
- Aliyev in 2021

Deputy Speaker of the National Assembly
- Incumbent
- Assumed office 10 March 2020 Serving with Fazail Ibrahimli
- Speaker: Sahiba Gafarova

Member of the National Assembly for Narimanov II
- Incumbent
- Assumed office 2 December 2005
- Preceded by: Constituency established

Personal details
- Born: 25 September 1969 (age 56) Makhta, Sharur District, Nakhchivan Autonomous Republic, Azerbaijan
- Party: Independent
- Education: St. Petersburg Naval Institute; Baku State University
- Occupation: Law
- Profession: School of law
- Website: Official Facebook Page

Adil Aliyev (Azerbaijani: Əliyev Adil Abış oğlu; born 25 September 1969) is the president of the Azerbaijan Kickboxing Federation, a Member of the National Assembly of Azerbaijan and Deputy Speaker of the National Assembly of Azerbaijan since 10 March 2020.

== Early life and education ==
Adil Aliyev was born on 25 September 1969 in Makhta village in the Sharur District, Nakhichevan ASSR, Azerbaijan SSR, Soviet Union. He graduated from the Baku sports boarding school in 1987. Adil Aliyev has been a Master of Sports since 1992. He graduated from the engineering and navigation department of the M. V Frunze Higher Naval School in Leningrad and the Police Academy of Azerbaijan, and completed his master’s studies and got a PhD degree at the Baku State University. He served as an officer in the Azerbaijani Military Naval Forces from 1992 to 1993.

== Career ==
He was a section head in the Navy of the Defence Ministry of the Azerbaijan Republic since 1992 and Duty Inspector with the Aquatic Transport Police Division of the Chief Transport Department of the Ministry of Internal Affairs of the Azerbaijan Republic starting in 1994 (then, an operative and a chief operative in the same office). He held various positions in the agencies of the Ministry of Internal Affairs from 1994 to 2003. Aliyev was a chief operative and then Deputy Chief of the 39th Police Station of the Sabayil District Police Department of Baku City starting in 1998, the chief of the ferry crossing sector in Main Traffic Police Department of the Republic of Azerbaijan, Line Police Unit Head and Departmental Inspector with the Aquatic Transport Police Division during 1999-2002. Beginning in 2002, he was Chief of Branch with the Binagadi District Police Department of Baku City and a department head in the Yasamal District Police Department of Baku City. Mr Aliyev served as Chief of the Police Branch No 16 with the Narimanov District Police Department of Baku City. He graduated from the Police Academy of the Ministry of Internal Affairs of the Republic of Azerbaijan in 1998, and he became the "forward pupil of police" in 2000.

Adil Aliyev has been the president of the Kickboxing Federation of Azerbaijan since 2000. He was awarded the rank of lieutenant police in 2003. He graduated from the master's degree of the Baku State University in 2004. Adil Aliyev worked as the head of the 16th department of Police Department Baku city Narimanov raion from 2003 to 2005. He was awarded with the state award for heroism medal by the decree of the President of the Republic of Azerbaijan in 2005. He worked as Deputy Chairman of the Defense and Security Committee of the CIS in 2009.

He became a World Kickboxing Association among veterans in 2009. He was elected a Member of the Milli Majlis of the Azerbaijan Republic of the 3rd, 4th and 5th convocations. He was the member of the Standing Commissions of the Milli Mejlis on Security and Defense issues, Youth and Sports, and is the leader of the working group on Azerbaijani-Kazakh Interparliamentary connections and Azerbaijan-Netherlands working group on interparliamentary relations. He is also a member of the Anti-Corruption Commission of the Republic of Azerbaijan and the Supervisory Board of the State Oil Fund of the Republic of Azerbaijan.

He was also a member of Azerbaijan-Russia, Azerbaijan-Ukraine, Azerbaijan-Germany and Azerbaijan-Turkey working group on interparliamentary relations from 2005 to 2010. Furthermore, he graduated from the post-graduate degree of the BSU in 2010. His monograph titled criminal-law and crime problems of mass unrest acts was published in 2012. This monograph is devoted to the study of the problems of the riots and the crime. He received Ph.D. in law on April 9, 2013. He is married and has three children. Lieutenant general Muharram Aliyev is the brother of Adil Aliyev.

On March 10, 2020, at the first plenary meeting of the Milli Majlis of Azerbaijan of the 6th convocation, Adil Aliyev was elected deputy chairman of the National Assembly of Azerbaijan. At the same time, he was elected head of the Committee on Youth and Sports.

== Awards ==
- Honorary title of "Police Officer" (2000)
- For Heroism Medal (2005)
- Medal "For services in the education of military patriotism" (2021)
- Medal "For 100th anniversary of the state security and foreign intelligence agencies of the Republic of Azerbaijan (1919–2019)" (2019)

== See also ==
- National Assembly of Azerbaijan
