= Sadiq Gurbanov =

Azerbaijani politician (born 1972)

Member of the New Azerbaijan Party Audit Commission
- Incumbent
- Assumed office 5 March 2021

Member of the National Assembly of the Republic of Azerbaijan
- Incumbent
- Assumed office 9 February 2020
- Constituency: 54th Shabran-Siyazan electoral district (2020–2024); 64th Salyan electoral district (since 2024)

Personal details
- Born: 12 July 1972 (age 54)
- Party: New Azerbaijan Party
- Education: Baku State University

Sadig Gurbanov (Sadiq Haqverdi oğlu Qurbanov; born on July 12, 1972, in Alikli, Ilich district) is an Azerbaijani politician and statesman. He holds a Candidate of Technical Sciences degree. He is a member of the New Azerbaijan Party Audit Commission and a deputy of the National Assembly of Azerbaijan of the VI and VII convocations. He is the chairman of the Natural Resources, Energy and Ecology Committee of the National Assembly. He is one of the first members of the New Azerbaijan Party.

== Biography ==
Sadik Gurbanov was born on July 12, 1972, in the Alekli village of Sharur district of Nakhchivan. He graduated from Arabyengica village secondary school in 1989 and entered the Baku State University Faculty of Mechanics and Mathematics in the same year. After completing his education in 1994, he became a doctoral student at the same faculty and also worked as a laboratory assistant in the department of "Theoretical Mechanics and Mechanics of the Whole Environment". In 2005, he defended his candidate's thesis and received the title of candidate of technical sciences. He studied at BSU Faculty of Law between 1997 and 2001. Between 2001 and 2004, upon the invitation of the National People's Congress, he studied at the "State and Municipal Administration" Faculty of the Public Administration Academy affiliated with the President.

He is married and has two children.

== Career ==
From 1999 to 2006, he served as the Head of the Inter-Party Relations Department at the Executive Secretariat of the New Azerbaijan Party. In 2010, he worked as the Head of the Control Sector within the Department for Poverty Issues and Targeted Social Assistance Policy at the Ministry of Labour and Social Protection of Population of the Republic of Azerbaijan.

He currently works as a senior lecturer at the Department of Economic Law at the Azerbaijan State University of Economics. At the same time, he has served as the Deputy Chairman of the Republican Trade Union Committee of Oil and Gas Industry Workers of the Republic of Azerbaijan.

He is the author of 11 scientific articles in the field of mechanics and mathematics, as well as 15 academic works in the field of law, and is also a co-author of the book “Commentary on the Labour Code.”

He was elected a deputy from the 54th Shabran–Siyazan electoral constituency of the New Azerbaijan Party in the parliamentary elections held on 9 February 2020.

He was elected a member of the Audit Commission at the 7th Congress of the New Azerbaijan Party on 5 March 2021.

He was re-elected as a deputy from the 64th Salyan electoral district on 23 September 2024.

He was elected Chairman of the Azerbaijan–Mauritania Interparliamentary Relations Working Group of the Milli Majlis on 8 October 2024.

== Books ==
The book "Leader beyond time: Heydar Aliyev's philosophy of management and succession"
