= Bakhtiyar Aliyev =

Azerbaijani professor (born 1961)

Bəxtiyar Əliyev
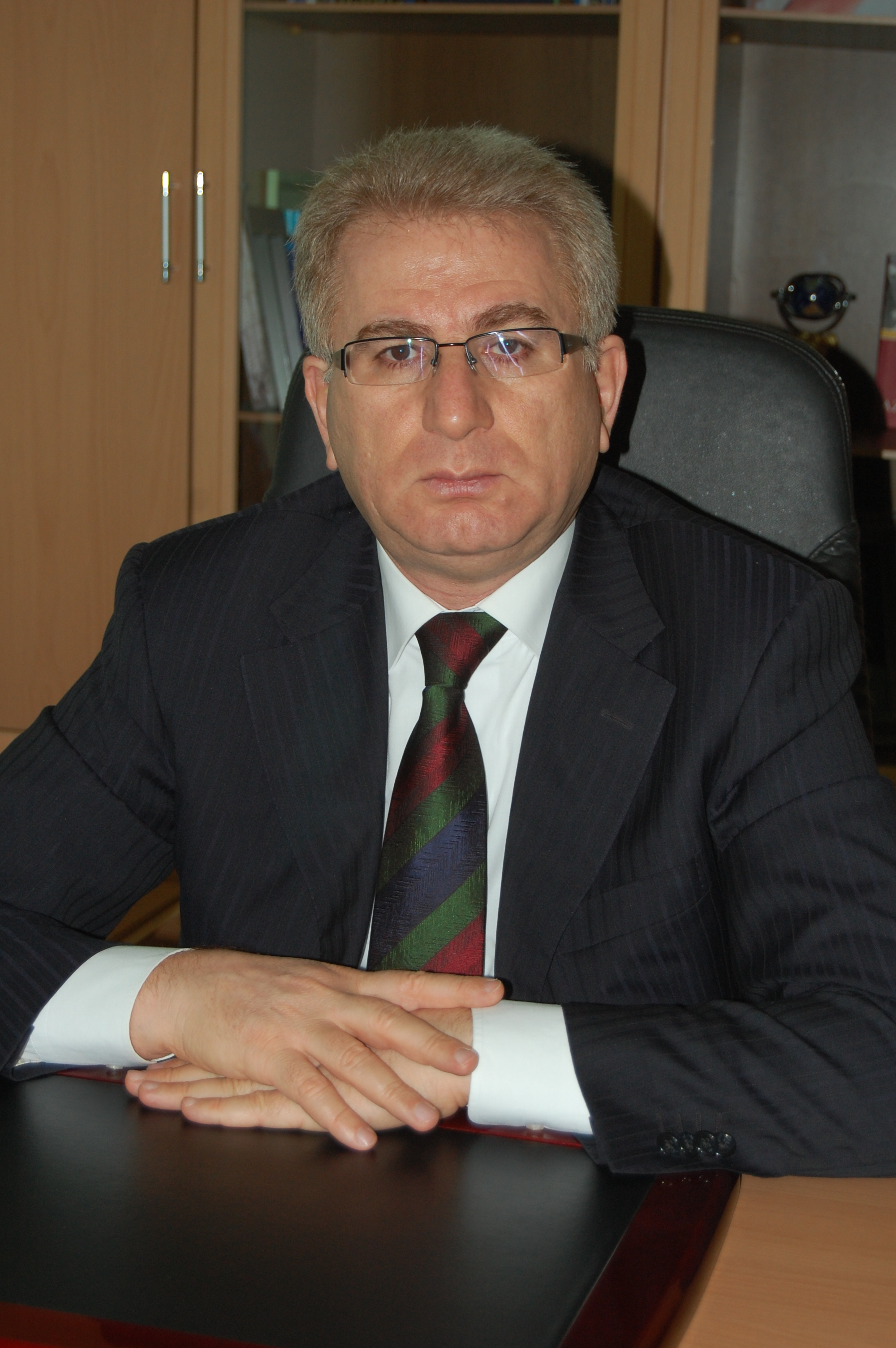

Member of the National Assembly of the Republic of Azerbaijan

Personal details
- Born: 20 March 1961 (age 64)
- Education: Moscow State University
- Awards: Shohrat Order

Bakhtiyar Aliyev (Əliyev Bəxtiyar Həmzə oğlu (Az); March 20, 1961, Agdam) — correspondent member of AMEA (2007), professor, doctor of psychological sciences, deputy of the National Assembly of the Republic of Azerbaijan, chairman of the Science and Education Committee of the National Assembly.

== Biography ==
Bakhtiyar Aliyev was born on March 20, 1961, in the city of Agdam. In 1978 he entered the Faculty of Psychology of Moscow State University named after M. V. Lomonosov. After graduating from this faculty in 1983, he started working at the Department of Psychology and Pedagogy of the Azerbaijan State University (now BSU). In 1989, he defended his candidate thesis in the field of philosophy on "Interethnic communication as an object of socio-psychological analysis", and in 1998 he defended his doctoral thesis in the field of psychology on "Problems of Forensic-Psychological Examination in Criminal and Criminal Law". Civil cases" and received the title of Doctor of Science in psychology in 1998. He has been a professor of psychological sciences since 2000. He was one of the first research scientists in the former USSR to develop the general theory of forensic psychological expertise. Based on this theory, for the first time, a new methodology for determining the physiological effect and defined a classification system of psychological criteria as well as types of forensic psychological expertise.The results obtained are used in legal practice to personalize and objectively investigate punishment.

He established the principles of organization and conduct of forensic examination of “physiological effect”, which is of necessary importance, and the scientific-legal foundations of evaluating the opinion of an expert-psychologist as a type of evidence. He gave scientific reports on this subject at international and republican scientific conferences.

At the same time, he created a new conceptual model on the formation and development of personality with a new personality perspective theory and introduced a learning approach model to increase the effectiveness of learning in the learning process. This model was discussed and approved at the international conference held in the Republic of Turkey. In addition, the most important result is that the understanding model of learning is included in the ANAS reports.

The study of various problems of political psychology occupies one of the leading places in its scientific activity. He is the author of numerous articles devoted to current issues of political psychology at the international level. He has been the head of the psychology department since 1997. He was elected a relevant member of ANAS in 2007. He has been the chairman of the Psychological Sciences Thesis Council since 2000. In 1999, he was elected as a full member of the International Personnel Academy due to his scientific activities. He pioneers scientific research in the field of cognitive processes and personality psychology by establishing the "Experimental psychology" scientific research laboratory at Baku State University for the first time in Azerbaijan.

Under his leadership, 36 candidacy and 6 doctoral theses were defended.

268 scientific works, including 6 monographs, 15 textbooks and lectures, 29 programs and methodological recommendations, 150 scientific articles and theses, have been published in foreign countries, and 55 scientific works have been published.

He founded the "Journal of Psychology" for the first time in Azerbaijan in 1999 and has been the editor-in-chief since then.

In addition to scientific-pedagogical activities, it is also interested in social-political activities. He was elected as a member of parliament in the 2nd (2000–2005) and 3rd (2005–2010) terms of the National Assembly of the Republic of Azerbaijan. He currently serves as a deputy in the 4th Meeting of the National Assembly. As a member of the Parliamentary Assembly of the Council of Europe, he was a member of the "Science and Education Committee", the "Monitoring Committee" and the chairman of the subcommittee "Working with Large-Scale Migrants and Displaced Persons". ". He has been the deputy chairman of the "Science and Education Committee" of the National Assembly of the Republic of Azerbaijan since 2005.

He is also a member of the "Amnesty Commission" and the "Anti-Corruption Commission of the Republic of Azerbaijan" under the President of the Republic of Azerbaijan. The II Conference, which is the working body of the UN Convention against Corruption, held in Indonesia. He participated in the International Conference and the International Conference organized by IAACA in Baku and various conferences.

He was awarded the Order of "Victory" for his services to the development of education and science in Azerbaijan.

== Educational and Scientific names ==
- In 1989, he defended his candidate's thesis in philosophy on "Interpersonal communication as an object of social-psychological analysis" and received the degree of candidate of philosophical sciences.
- In 1998, he defended his doctoral thesis on psychological sciences titled "Problems of forensic psychological expertise in criminal and civil cases" and received the scientific title of doctor of psychological sciences, and since 2000, he received the scientific title of professor of psychological sciences.

== Labor Activity ==
- 2007 - Responsible member of AMEA
- 2016 - until now, member of the AAK Presidency under the President of the Republic of Azerbaijan. 2020 - until now, he chaired the Science and Education Commission of the National Assembly.
- He served as vice chairman of the National Assembly Science and Education Commission between 2005 and 2019.
- 2000 - until now, deputy in the National Assembly.
- 2000 — Professor of Psychology Department.
- 1999–2016 – President of AAK Psychological Sciences Thesis Council.
- 1999 - Full member of the International Personnel Academy.
- 1997–2020 — Head of BSU Psychology Department.
- 1993–1999 - Scientific secretary of the AAK Psychological Sciences Thesis Council.
- 1992 — Associate Professor of BSU Department of Psychology.
- 1983–1992 - ASU Department of Psychology and Pedagogy teacher. 1978–1983 - student of Moscow State University named after M. V. Lomonosov.

== Scientific Studies ==
- "Current problems of legal psychology";
- "Problems of forensic psychological expertise in criminal and civil cases";
- "Psychology and study of the villain";
- "General theory of forensic psychological expertise";
- "Social Psychology";
- "Legal psychology";
- He is the author of 6 monographs, 15 textbooks and teaching aids, 29 program and methodological recommendations, 216 scientific articles and theses;
- 45 works were published abroad.
