= Ahliman Amiraslanov =

Azerbaijani oncologist, professor and rector (born 1947)

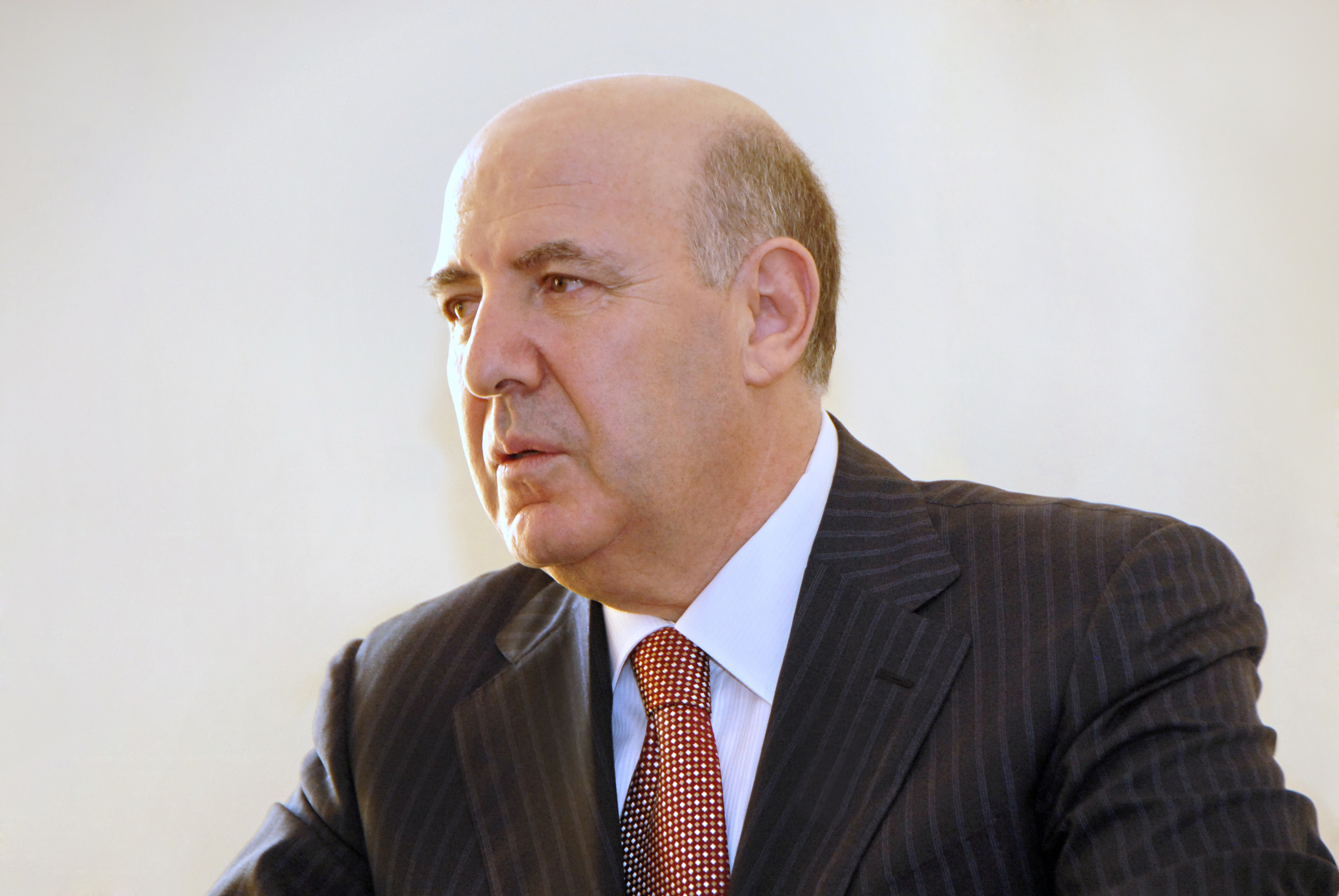
- Born: Azerbaijani: Əhliman Tapdıq oğlu Əmiraslanov; 17 November 1947 (age 78); Zod, Basargechar raion, Armenian SSR
- Education: Azerbaijan State Medical Institute

Ahliman Tapdiq oğlu Amiraslanov (Azerbaijani: Əhliman Tapdıq oğlu Əmiraslanov) (born 1947) is an Azerbaijani scholar, public-political figure, surgeon-oncologist, Doctor of Medical Sciences (1984), professor (1989), a full member of the Azerbaijan National Academy of Sciences (since 2001) and the Polish Academy of Medical Sciences (1998), as well as a foreign member of the Russian Academy of Sciences (2001). He has been the academic secretary of the Biology and Medical Sciences Division of ANAS since 2007.

He is a laureate of the USSR State Prize (1986), the "Shohrat" Order of the Republic of Azerbaijan (2000), the "Sharaf" Order of the Republic of Azerbaijan (2017), and the 1st degree "Order for Service to the Fatherland" (2022). In 1991, he was honored with the title of "Honored Scientist of the Republic of Azerbaijan."

In 1990, he was a deputy of the Supreme Soviet of the Azerbaijan SSR and served as a deputy of the National Assembly of the Republic of Azerbaijan in the 4th (2010), 5th (2015), and 6th terms (2020). He was the rector of the Azerbaijan Medical University (1992–2015) and has been the head of the Oncology Department at the same university since 1993.

Since July 18, 2014, he has been a member of the Board of Trustees of the Knowledge Fund under the President of the Republic of Azerbaijan. He is also the chairman of the Health Committee of the National Assembly of Azerbaijan (since 2015) and a member of the New Azerbaijan Party.

== Personal life ==
He was born in 1947 in the village Zod in the Basargechar raion of the Armenian SSR. In 1965, he graduated with a gold medal from the Zod village secondary school, and that same year was admitted to the Faculty of Medicine-Preventive Care at the Azerbaijan State Medical Institute named after N. Narimanov. In 1969, while still a student, he began working as a medical assistant at the Baku City Clinical Oncology Hospital. After graduating with honors in 1971, from 1971 to 1974, he worked as a medical intern and later head of the surgery department at the Baku City Clinical Oncology Hospital. Between 1974 and 1977, he was a postgraduate student at the All-Union Oncological Scientific Center of the USSR Academy of Medical Sciences.

Since 1977, after completing his postgraduate studies in Moscow, he worked as a junior researcher at the General Oncology Department of the All-Union Oncological Scientific Center of the USSR Academy of Medical Sciences. From 1981, he served as a senior researcher and, from 1984, a leading researcher in the same department.

On June 18, 1987, he was confirmed as a lead researcher at the General Oncology Department of the All-Union Oncological Scientific Center. In 1989, he was elected professor of the same department, holding the position until July 31, 1992.

From 1992 until November 24, 2015, Amiraslanov served as the rector of the Azerbaijan Medical University. He is a member of the New Azerbaijan Party.

On March 23, 1993, he was elected head of the Oncology Department at Azerbaijan Medical University through a competitive process. Since 2007, he has also served as the director of the university's Oncology Clinic.

In 1998, Amiraslanov became a foreign member of the Polish Academy of Medical Sciences, and in 2001, a foreign member of the Russian Academy of Sciences, as well as a full member of the Azerbaijan National Academy of Sciences (ANAS). He was elected deputy academic secretary of the Biology and Medical Sciences Division of ANAS in 2001. Since 2006, he has been a member of the Governing Board of UNESCO's "Committee on Bioethics, Scientific Knowledge, and Technology Ethics" and an expert for UNESCO.

In 2007, Amiraslanov was elected academic secretary of the Biology Sciences Division of the Azerbaijan National Academy of Sciences. On April 30, 2010, by decree of the President of Azerbaijan, he was appointed to the Board of Trustees of the Science Development Fund and the State Prize Committee for Science, Technology, Architecture, Culture, and Literature. He was also appointed a member of the editorial board for the preparation of the National Atlas of the Republic of Azerbaijan.

In 1990, Amiraslanov was elected deputy of the Supreme Soviet of the Azerbaijan SSR, and in 2010 and 2015, he was elected a member of the National Assembly of the Republic of Azerbaijan. He is the chairman of the National Assembly's Health Committee.

In 2011, Amiraslanov became a full member of the European Society for Medical Oncology and was elected a member of the Coordination Council of World Azerbaijanis at the III Congress of World Azerbaijanis. He is a UNESCO expert and the chairman of the Interparliamentary Commission of the Parliamentary Assembly of Turkic-Speaking Countries (TURKPA).

On July 18, 2014, he was appointed a member of the Board of Trustees of the Knowledge Fund under the President of the Republic of Azerbaijan. On June 29, 2016, he was elected chairman of the National Committee for "Bioethics, Science, and Technology Ethics" of UNESCO in Azerbaijan.

== Activities ==
=== Activities at Azerbaijan Medical University ===
In 1992, Ahliman Amiraslanov was appointed as the rector of the N. Narimanov Azerbaijan State Medical Institute, and in 1993, he was elected as the head of the oncology department at the same university. Under his leadership, the department was restructured, and young, promising personnel were involved in extensive scientific and practical work.

At the Azerbaijan Medical University (AMU), various reforms were carried out under Amiraslanov's leadership, with new innovative projects being developed and implemented. Several new clinics were constructed and launched, including the Stomatology Clinic (2002), Oncology Clinic (2007), Therapeutic Teaching Clinic (2010), and Surgical Teaching Clinic (2013). These clinics, built with funds allocated by President Ilham Aliyev's decrees, became some of the most modern educational institutions in the region.

Amiraslanov's dedicated efforts and active participation in fostering international relations, in 1996, AMU became the only university from CIS countries (excluding Russia and Ukraine) to be included in the International Registry of the American and European Association for Higher Education, published in London. AMU also became a full member of the Black Sea Universities Network in 1998, the International Association of Universities in 2000, and the European University Association in 2002.

The facilities of the university's departments were expanded, with lecture rooms and laboratories equipped with modern technologies. All faculties now conduct classes based on the Bologna credit system.

=== International activity ===
Academic Amiraslanov has frequently participated in congresses, symposia, and conferences held in countries like the US, France, Japan, Italy, Sweden, Turkey, Canada, Greece, Germany, Hungary, Austria, the Czech Republic, Iran, Singapore, Russia, Pakistan, Poland, Israel, and others, where he presented scientific innovations that have been successfully implemented in healthcare.

He is a distinguished member of various international associations, including the World Association of Orthopedic Traumatologists and Oncologists, the Oncologists' Societies of Greece, the Czech Republic, and Hungary, the European Association for Reconstructive Surgery, the American Society of Clinical Oncology, and the Russian Academy of Natural Sciences, among others.

In 1999, he was elected deputy chairman of the Azerbaijan National Committee for UNESCO's "Bioethics, Scientific Knowledge, and Technology Ethics" program. In May 1999, he was awarded the Albert Schweitzer Prize and the "Great Gold Medal" of the Polish Academy of Medical Sciences, and in 2007, he received the N. N. Blokhin Gold Medal from the Russian Academy of Medical Sciences. In 2009, as part of Russia's "Leaders of the 21st Century" program, he was recognized with the international award "Intellect of the Nation."

Besides being a UNESCO expert and the chairman of the Inter-Parliamentary Commission of the Parliamentary Assembly of Turkic-speaking Countries (TÜRKPA), Amiraslanov has been actively involved in international activities as a deputy of the Milli Majlis (National Assembly) and a member of the Inter-Parliamentary Assembly Council of the Commonwealth of Independent States (CIS).

== Main scientific achievements and awards ==
- 1985 — Academician Petrov's award of the Academy of Medical Sciences of USSR;
- 1986 — USSR State Prize
- 1991 — A Meritorious Scientist of the Azerbaijan Republic;
- 1999 — Laureate of A.Schweizer Golden Medal of Poland Academy of Medical Sciences;
- 2000 — Recipient of the Shohrat Order
- 2017 — "Sharaf" Order of the Republic of Azerbaijan
- 2022 — the 1st degree "Order for Service to the Fatherland"

== Membership with international and foreign scientific organizations ==
- Member of International Association of Orthopedists, Traumatologists and Oncologists;
- Member of European Association of Reconstructive Surgery;
- Member of Grecian, Hungarian, Czechoslovak Society of Oncologists;
- Member of American Society of Clinical Oncology;
- Active member of Russian Academy of Medical Sciences;
- Active member of Poland Academy of Medical Sciences;
- Active member of Russian Academy of Natural Sciences;
- Active member of Azerbaijan National Academy of Sciences;
