= Ulviyya Hamzayeva =

Azerbaijani artist (born 1982)

- Born: 1982 (age 43–44)
- Education: Nakhchivan State University
- Occupation: Painter

Ulviyya Hamzayeva (born 30 April 1982) is a politician and painter from Azerbaijan.

== Education ==
Hamzayeva graduated from Nakhchivan State University in 2003. She is an author of the monument raised in Nakhchivan to Genocide of Azerbaijanians. She studied MA in Arts and is currently pursuing a PhD.

== Career ==
Ulviyya has been teaching art and art history at Nakhchivan State University since 2005. She was awarded the title “Honored Artist of Nakhchivan Autonomous Republic” in 2008. In 2009 she was awarded the title “Honored Artist of the Azerbaijan Republic” by the President of the Azerbaijan Republic. Ulviyya Hamzayeva was elected as Chairperson of “Artists Union of Nakhchivan Autonomous Republic” in February 2011. Since 2013 she has been a member of World Academy of Arts "New Era". Ulviyya Hamzayeva has been a member of the National Assembly of Azerbaijan Republic since 2015. Her works belong to local museums, private and public collections.
