= Eldar Guliyev =

Azerbaijani politician

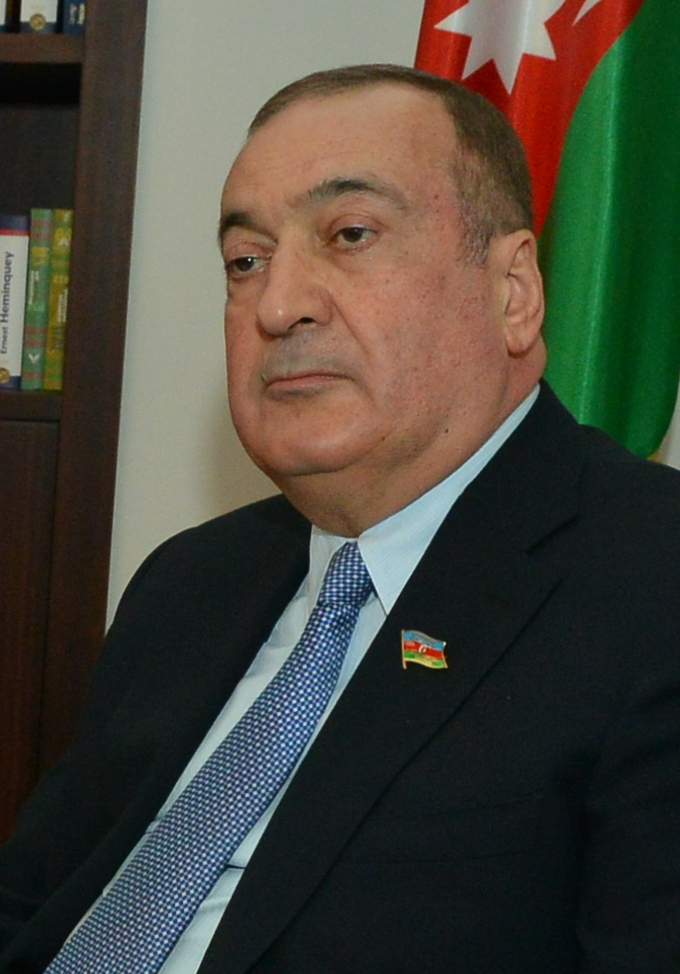

Member of Parliament of Azerbaijan
- Incumbent
- Assumed office November 5, 2000

Personal details
- Born: Eldar Allahyar oghlu Guliyev; July 26, 1951 (age 74) Baku, Azerbaijan SSR, Soviet Union
- Awards

Eldar Allahyar oghlu Guliyev (Azerbaijani: Eldar Allahyar oğlu Quliyev; born July 26, 1951) is an Azerbaijani politician. He became a Member of the Parliament of Azerbaijan in 2000.

== Early life and career ==
He was born in Baku. In 1968, he finished school at No. 187 in Baku, and in 1969, entered the Azerbaijan Institute of the National Economy (now the Azerbaijan State University of Economics). He became an economist after graduation in 1973. He served in the Soviet Army from 1974-1975. From 1975-1987, he worked in the Trade Ministry. After 1987, he worked as the chairman or the Union of Azerbaijan Central Corporations. He is married with two children.

== See also ==
- Cabinet of Azerbaijan
- Government of Azerbaijan
