= Ali Huseynli =

Azerbaijani politician (born 1968)

- Əli Hüseynli
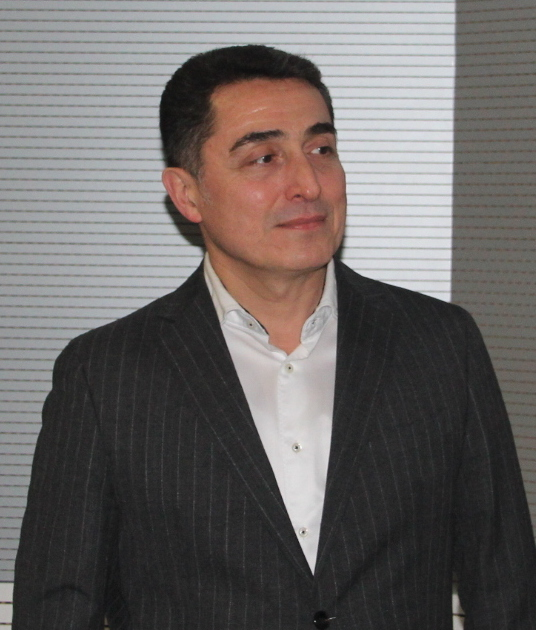
- Huseynli in 2021
- Born: 8 October 1968 (age 57); Baku, Azerbaijan SSR, USSR
- Education: Baku State University
- Political party: New Azerbaijan Party

Ali Huseynli (azərb. Əli Hüseynli, born 8 October 1968) is an Azerbaijani politician. He is a is member of the New Azerbaijan Party, First Vice-Speaker of the Milli Majlis of the Azerbaijan [SA1] (1996–2000), Deputy of the Milli Majlis (since 2000), and first Deputy Chairman of the National Assembly of Azerbaijan (since 10 March 2020).

== Biography ==
Hüseyinli completed his secondary education in 1985 at School No. 135 in the Binagadi district of Baku. From 1985 to 1986, he worked as a laborer in the "Kalininselstroy" construction department in the Kalinin region of the Russian SFSR. In 1987, he enrolled in the Faculty of Law of Kalinin State University. He paused his studies for military service, which he completed between 1988 and 1989, and later graduated from the Faculty of Law at Baku State University in 1993.

He began his professional career in the judiciary, serving at the Supreme Court of the Republic of Azerbaijan from 1991 to 1995. He subsequently worked in the Executive Office of the President of Azerbaijan from 1995 to 1996, and in the National Assembly from 1996 to 2000.

In addition to his current parliamentary roles, Hüseyinli has been a member of the Judicial Council of the Republic of Azerbaijan and serves as a member of the Anti-Corruption Commission of the Republic of Azerbaijan.

He is married and has two children.

== Political activity ==
In 1995, Ali Huseynli was appointed as a specialist in the executive office of the president of Azerbaijan.

== See also ==
Azerbaijan

National Assembly (Azerbaijan)
