= Sahiba Gafarova =

Azerbaijani (born 1955)

- Sahibə Qafarova
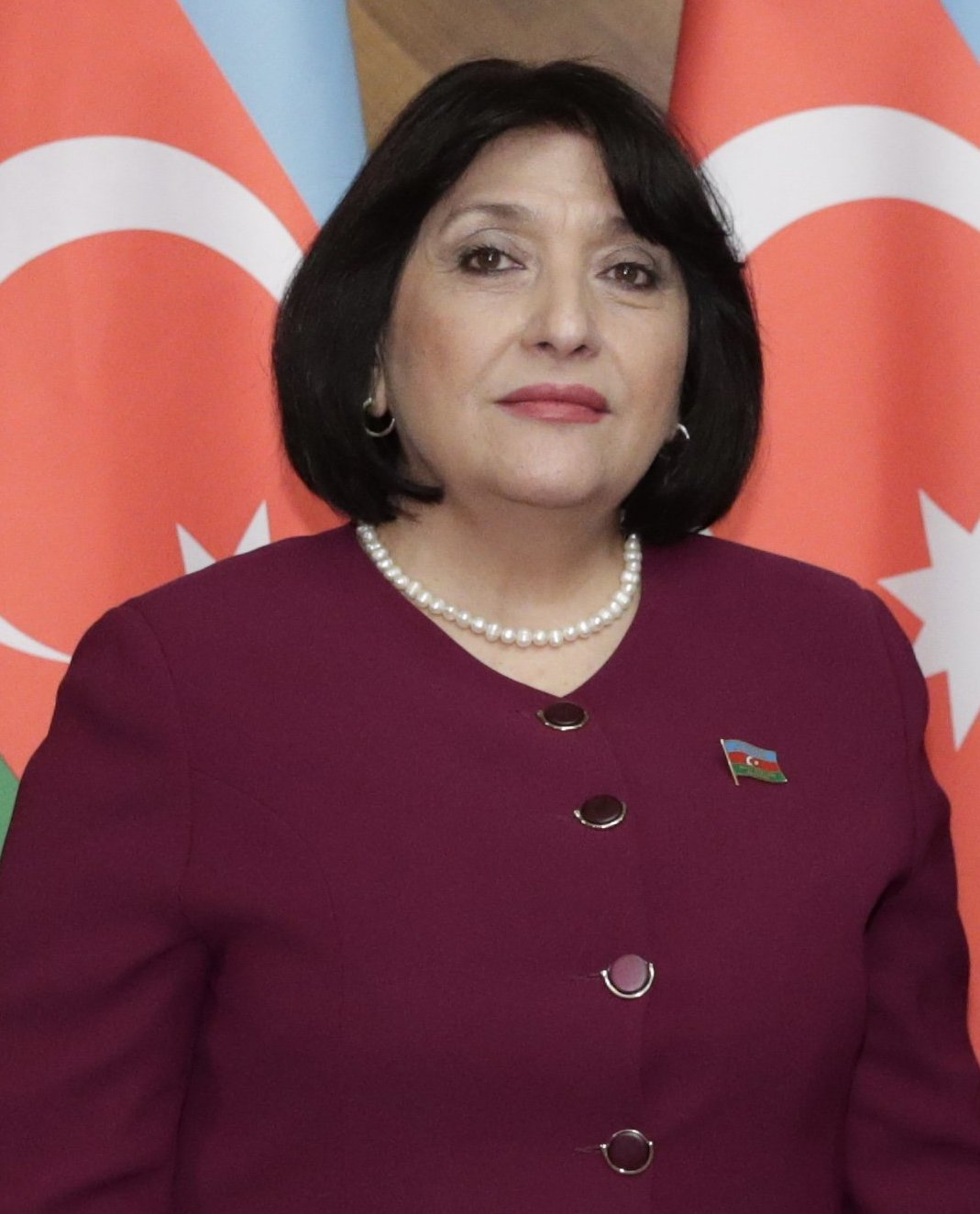
- Gafarova in 2020

Speaker of the National Assembly
- Incumbent
- Assumed office 10 March 2020
- President: Ilham Aliyev
- Preceded by: Ogtay Asadov

Member of the National Assembly
- Incumbent
- Assumed office 2010

Personal details
- Born: 19 March 1955 (age 71) Shamkhor, Azerbaijan SSR, Soviet Union
- Party: New Azerbaijan
- Children: 2
- Education: Azerbaijan Pedagogical Institute of Russian Language and Literature; Azerbaijan Pedagogical Institute of Foreign Languages

Sahiba Ali gizi Gafarova (Azerbaijani: Sahibə Əli qızı Qafarova; born 19 March 1955) is an Azerbaijani politician and academic who has been Speaker of the National Assembly since 2020 and in the assembly as a member of the New Azerbaijan Party since 2010.

== Early life and education ==
Sahiba Ali gizi Gafarova was born in Shamkhor, Azerbaijan SSR, Soviet Union, on 19 March 1955. She graduated from the Azerbaijan Pedagogical Institute of Russian Language and Literature and the Azerbaijan Pedagogical Institute of Foreign Languages.

== Career ==
From 1978 to 1981, Gafarova was a teacher at a high school in Shamkir. From 1981 to 2020, she worked at the Baku Slavic University as a laboratory assistant, teacher, professor, and head of the Department of European Languages. At the Western Caspian University, she was dean of the Faculty of Western Languages from 2000 to 2004.

In the 2010 election Gafarova won a seat in the National Assembly as a member of the New Azerbaijan Party. During her tenure in the assembly, she was Deputy Chair of the Family, Women, and Children's Affairs committee. Gafarova was elected Speaker of the assembly on 10 March 2020 and reelected on 23 September 2024.

Gafarova was a member of Azerbaijan's delegation to the Parliamentary Assembly of the Council of Europe from 2010 to 2020 and head of the delegation to the Euronest Parliamentary Assembly from 2018 to 2020. She is the head of the delegation to the Inter-Parliamentary Union, TURKPA, and CIS Interparliamentary Assembly.

== Personal life ==
Gafarova is married and is the mother of two children. The Order of Friendship was given to her by Vladimir Putin in 2025.

== Works cited ==
=== News ===
- Kuenning, Xandie (12 March 2025). "Putin awards Order of Friendship to Azerbaijani Parliamentary Speaker Gafarova". OC Media. Archived from the original on 30 June 2025.

=== Web ===
- "Azerbaijan". Inter-Parliamentary Union. Archived from the original on 30 June 2025.
- "Milli Məclisin Sədri". National Assembly. Archived from the original on 30 June 2025.
