= Civic Solidarity Party =

Azerbaijani political party

Civic Solidarity Party Vətəndaş Həmrəyliyi Partiyası
- Leader: Sabir Rustamkhanli
- Founded: 26 September 1992
- Preceded by: Azerbaijani Popular Front
- Headquarters: Baku
- Ideology: National conservatism Populism
- Political position: Right-wing
- Parliament: 3 / 125

Website
- http://vhp.az/

The Civic Solidarity Party (Azerbaijani: Vətəndaş Həmrəyliyi Partiyası, VHP) is a political party in Azerbaijan. It was founded in 1992. The party's leader is Sabir Rustamkhanli, who is originally a poet. The party's ideology is based on the "universal political values of freedom, equality and solidarity".

At the 2010 parliamentary elections, it won 3 out of 125 seats. In the 2015 parliamentary elections, it won 2 out of 125 seats. In the 2020 parliamentary elections, it won 3 out of 125 seats.

According to a 2023 report by the State Committee for Family, Women and Children's Issues, 61% of the members of the Civic Solidarity Party were men and 39% were women.

== Election results ==
=== National Assembly elections ===
Election	Leader	Votes	%	Seats	+/–	Position	Government
1995–1996	Sabir Rustamkhanli			1 / 125	New	▲10th	Support
2000–2001	Sabir Rustamkhanli	182,777	6.43	3 / 125	▲2	▲3rd	Support
2005	Sabir Rustamkhanli			2 / 125	▼1	3rd	Support
2010	Sabir Rustamkhanli	46,512	1.95	2 / 125	▲1	3rd	Support
2015	Sabir Rustamkhanli	37,561	1.32	2 / 125	▼1	3rd	Support
2020	Sabir Rustamkhanli	27,121	1.16	3 / 125	▲1	3rd	Support
2024	Sabir Rustamkhanli	33,722	1.42	3 / 125	0	▲2nd	Support
