= National Assembly (Azerbaijan) =

Unicameral legislature of Azerbaijan

Coordinates: 40.357914°N 49.825368°E

National Assembly of the Republic of Azerbaijan Azərbaycan Respublikasının Milli Məclisi
- 7th convocation
- Logo of the National Assembly

Type
- Type: Unicameral

History
- Founded: 12 November 1995
- Preceded by: Supreme Soviet (Ali Sovet) of the Republic of Azerbaijan

Leadership
- Speaker: Sahiba Gafarova, YAP since 10 March 2020
- First Deputy Speaker: Ali Huseynli, YAP since 10 March 2020
- Deputy Speaker: Fazail Ibrahimli, VHP since 10 March 2020
- Deputy Speaker: Adil Aliyev, Independent since 10 March 2020

Structure
- Seats: 125
- Political groups: Government (68): New Azerbaijan (68); Other parties (13): Civic Solidarity (3); Justice, Law, Democracy (2); Republican Alternative (1); Democratic Enlightenment (1); Motherland (1); Democratic Reforms (1); Great Order (1); AMİP (1); BAP (1); National Front (1); Independents (44): Independents (44)
- Length of term: 5 years

Elections
- Voting system: First-past-the-post voting
- First election: 12 November 1995
- Last election: 1 September 2024
- Next election: 2028

Meeting place
- Building of the National Assembly
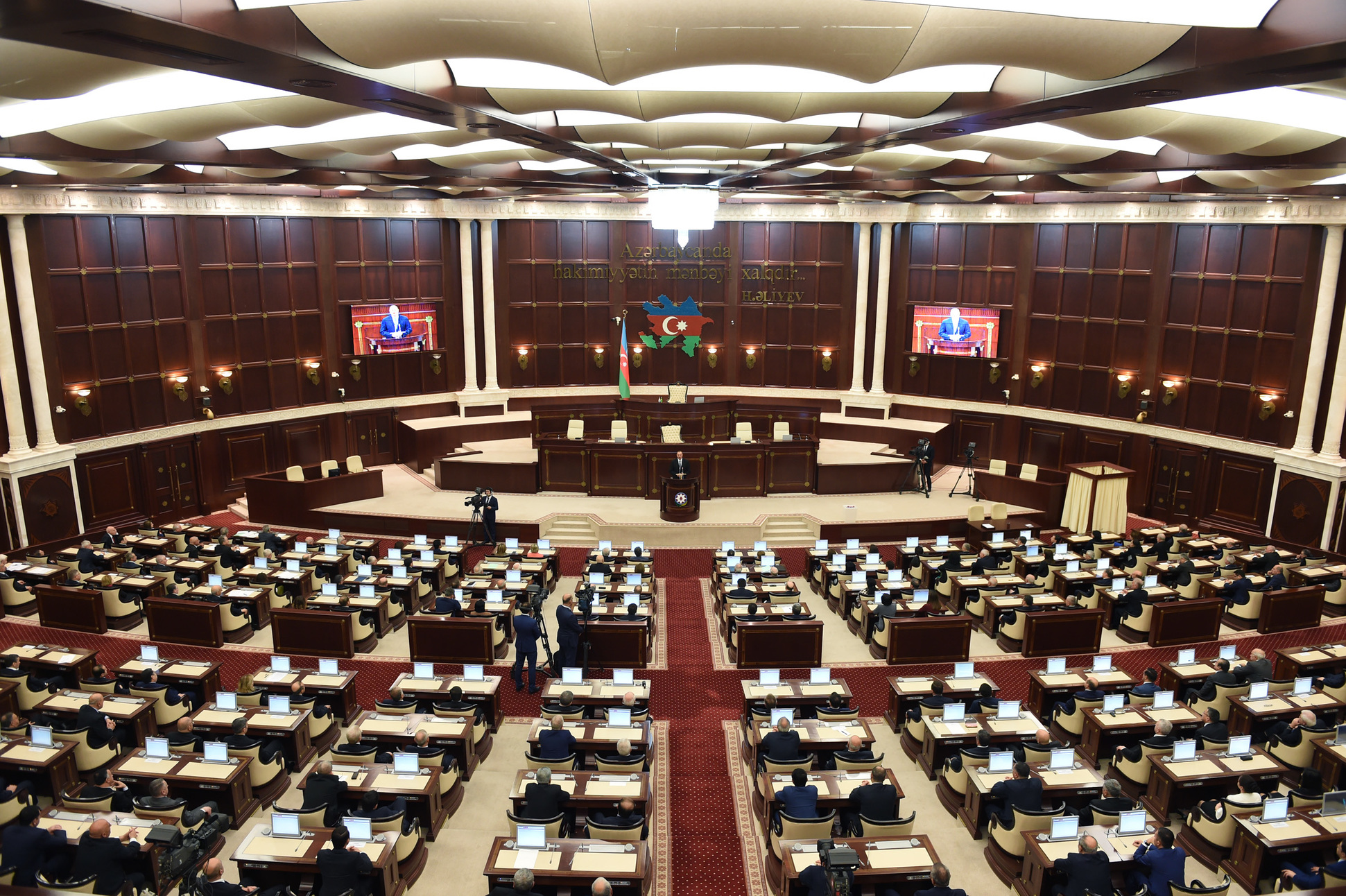
- Chamber of the National Assembly

Website
- meclis.gov.az

The National Assembly (Azerbaijani: Milli Məclis), also transliterated as Milli Majlis, is the legislative branch of government in Azerbaijan. The unicameral National Assembly has 125 deputies: previously 100 members were elected for five-year terms in single-seat constituencies and 25 members were elected by proportional representation; as of the latest election, however, all 125 deputies are returned from single-member constituencies.

The Assembly nominally has powers under the Azerbaijan Constitution, but in practice power is heavily concentrated in Ilham Aliyev, the President of Azerbaijan. Parliamentary elections in Azerbaijan are widely regarded as not being free and fair.

Between 1993 and 2010, major opposition parties were allowed some representation in the Assembly in each election. However, since 2010, no opposition parties have held seats in the Assembly. There are nominal opposition parties and independents, but they are supportive of the Aliyev regime.

The constitutional amendments of 2016 allow the president to dissolve parliament.

== History ==
=== Azerbaijan Democratic Republic (1918–1920) ===
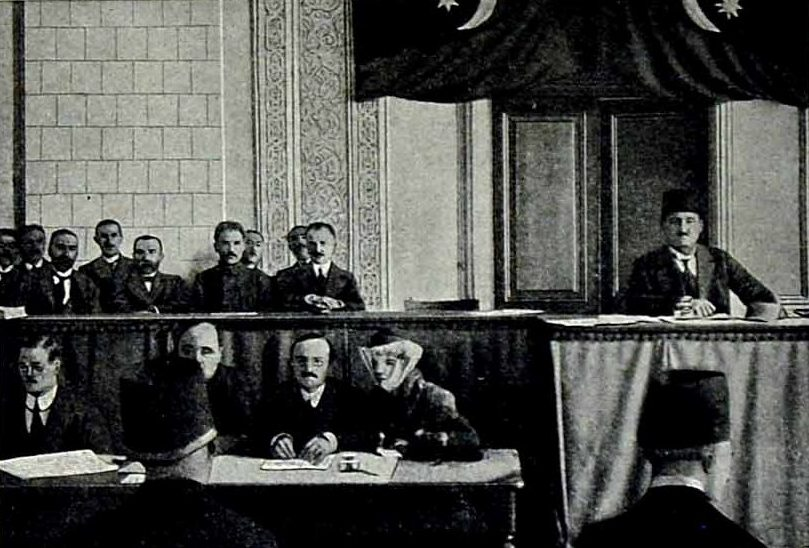
First meeting of the Azerbaijani Parliament

Parliament in 1918 Musavat and Independents: 40 seats Ittihad: 14 seats Ahrar: 8 seats Socialists: 14 seats Independents: 4 seats Unaffiliated: 4 seats Left independent: 1 seat Slavic alliance: 5 seats Ethnic minorities: 7 seats Armenian fraction: 5 seats Dashnaksutyun: 7 seats Vacant: 11 seats

Following the Russian Revolution in February 1917, a special committee consisting of deputies from the Transcaucasian State Duma was created. In November, the Transcaucasian Commissariat was created as the first government of independent Transcaucasia. The Sejm, made up of representatives of three nations, did not have a solid political platform, as each nation looked after its interests. This subsequently led to the dissolution of the Sejm on 25 May 1918.

On 27 May, 44 Muslim deputies of the Sejm gathered in Tbilisi and established the Azerbaijan National Council to form the government of Azerbaijan. Mammad Emin Rasulzade was elected its chairman. On 28 May, the National Council passed a resolution proclaiming the independence of Azerbaijan Democratic Republic. On 16 June, the National Council and the Azerbaijani government moved to Ganja. At the seventh session of the council in Ganja chaired by Mammad Emin Rasulzade, it was decided to dissolve the council and transfer all legislative and executive power to the interim government of Azerbaijan headed by Fatali Khan Khoyski. Once the government was established, Azerbaijani was made the official state language. One of the priorities of the government before moving to Baku was to liberate Baku from the Centrocaspian Dictatorship then take control of the city, which took place on 15 September 1918. On 16 November the National Council reconvened, and on 19 November, Rasulzade announced that all nationalities of Azerbaijan will be represented in the Azerbaijani Parliament, consisting of 120 deputies.

Therefore, based on 24 thousand representatives of nationalities of Azerbaijan, the Azerbaijani parliament, made up of 80 Muslims, 21 Armenians, 10 Russians, 1 German, and 1 Jew, was established on 29 November and convened on 7 December 1918. Thus, the first session of the parliament took place in the building of the former Zeynalabdin Tagiyev Russian Muslim School located on present-day Istiglaliyyat Street of Baku and was chaired by Rasulzade. Alimardan Topchubashov was elected the Speaker of the Parliament, Hasanbey Agayev—Deputy Speaker. By the end of 1919, there were 11 various political party factions in the parliament represented by 96 deputies. During its 17-month existence, the parliament held 145 sessions with the last session being convened on 27 April 1920 on the eve of the Russian occupation of Azerbaijan. A total of 270 resolutions were sponsored, 230 of which were passed. Parliamentary delegations of Azerbaijan signed several friendship treaties with Turkey, Iran, Great Britain, and the US and a defense pact with Georgia and attended the Paris Peace Conference several times, requesting recognition from Western countries. In January 1920, the Azerbaijan Democratic Republic was de facto recognized by the Peace Conference.

== Parliament of the Republic of Azerbaijan ==
The building of the National Assembly of Azerbaijan

The first Azerbaijani parliamentary election was held in late 1990, when the Supreme Soviet already held discussions on the independence of Azerbaijan from the Soviet Union. The 1995 parliamentary election was the first to be held after the restoration of Azerbaijan's independence.

The assembly is headed by its Speaker assisted by the first deputy speaker and two deputy speakers. Sahiba Gafarova is the current speaker of the assembly, Ali Huseynli is the First Deputy Speaker and, Fazail Ibrahimli and Adil Aliyev are deputy speakers. The work at the parliament is administered by the Parliament Apparatus headed by Sefa Mirzayev, aided by Assistant Manager Elkhan Ahmadov. The Parliament Apparatus is subdivided into Department of State Roster for Territorial Units and Municipalities, and Codification Sector Department.

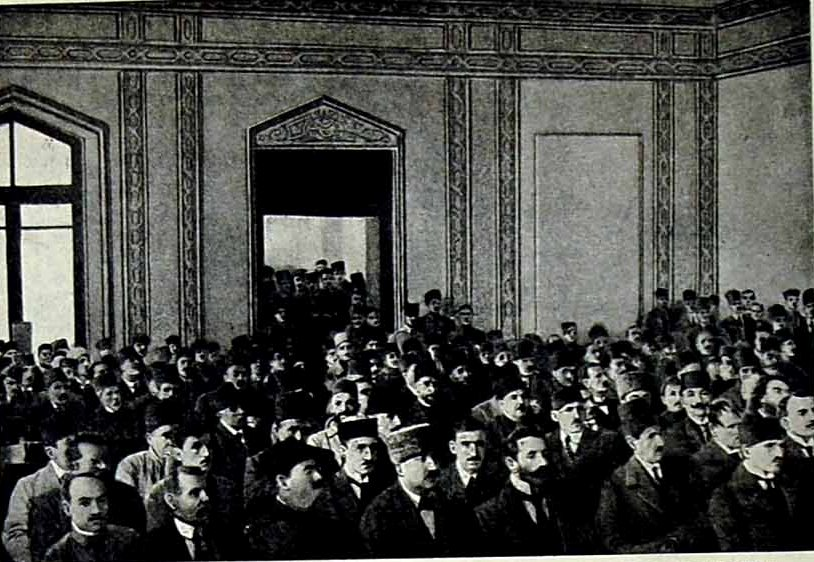
First session of the National Assembly in 1918

In the 2010 parliamentary elections, the ruling New Azerbaijan Party strengthened its grasp on the legislature, securing a majority of 73 out of 125 seats. The other seats went to nominally independent, government-leaning candidates, and to “soft opposition” parties. The two major opposition parties (Musavat and the Parties of the People's Front of Azerbaijan) lost their previous eight seats, thus resulting in an opposition-free Parliament. The Central Election Commission said turnout was 50.1%, out of a total of 4.9 million people eligible to vote. Opposition leaders suggested the low turnout was due to candidate disqualifications by the CEC and consequent discouragement to vote after their choice of candidate was excluded.

The United States declared that the elections "did not meet international standards", while the Organization for Security and Co-operation in Europe, the EU, and the Council of Europe highlighted some positive aspects, while stating that "the conduct of the elections did not represent significant progress in the process of the country’s democratic development".

2015 Parliamentary elections resulted in 72 seats won by the ruling party. Currently, Parliament consists of 15 parliamentary committees:

- Legal Policies and State Structuring Committee, chaired by first deputy speaker of the parliament, MP Ali Huseynli
- Defense and Security Committee, chaired by MP Ziyafet Asgarov
- Economic Policies Committee, chaired by MP Tahir Mirkishili
- Committee on Natural Resources, Energy and Ecology, chaired by MP Sadig Gurbanov
- Committee on Agrarian Policies, chaired by MP Tahir Rzayev
- Social Policies Committee, chaired by MP Musa Guliyev
- Committee on Regional Issues, chaired by MP Siyavush Novruzov
- Committee on Science and Education, chaired by MP Bakhtiyar Aliyev
- Committee on Cultural Issues, chaired by MP Ganira Pashayeva
- Committee on Public Unions and Religious entities, chaired by deputy speaker of the Parliament, MP Fazail Ibrahimli
- Committee on Youth and Sport, chaired by deputy speaker of the Parliament, MP Adil Aliyev
- Committee on Health Issues, chaired by MP Ahliman Emiraslanov
- Committee on Family, Women and Children Affairs, chaired by MP Hijran Huseynova
- International and Interparliamentary Relations Committee, chaired by MP Samad Seyidov
- Human Rights Committee, chaired by MP Zahid Oruj

In addition to the parliamentary committees, Milli Majlis has a Chamber of Accounting, Toponyms, and Disciplinary Commissions. The Disciplinary Commission is chaired by MP Eldar Ibrahimov. The parliament publishes its own newspaper, Azərbaycan qəzeti (Azerbaijan newspaper), widely distributed around the country.

Parliament also established more than 80 "Interparliamentary working groups" with the parliaments of more than 80 states in the world.

== Chairmen of the National Assembly (Supreme Soviet to 1995) of Azerbaijan ==
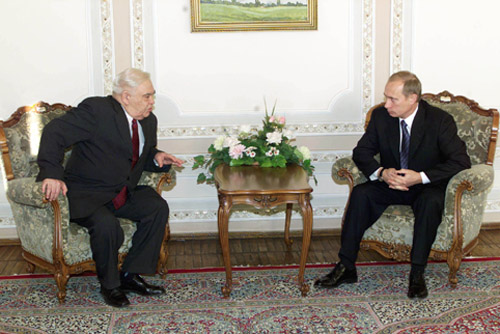
Speaker of the National Assembly of Azerbaijan Murtuz Alasgarov meeting Russian President Vladimir Putin in 2001.

- Elmira Gafarova 5 February 1991 – 5 March 1992.
- Yagub Mammadov 5 March 1992 – 18 May 1992
- Isa Gambar 18 May 1992 – 13 June 1993
- Heydar Aliyev 24 June 1993 – 5 November 1993
- Rasul Guliyev 5 November 1993 – 11 September 1996
- Murtuz Alasgarov 16 October 1996 – 2 December 2005
- Ogtay Asadov 2 December 2005– 10 March 2020
- Sahiba Gafarova 10 March 2020–today

== See also ==
- Politics of Azerbaijan
- Government of Azerbaijan
- Cabinet of Azerbaijan
- Azerbaijani parliamentary election, 2010
- List of legislatures by country
- List of political parties in Azerbaijan
- Constitution of Azerbaijan
