= 2026 in Azerbaijan =

- Decades: 2000s; 2010s; 2020s
- See also: Other events of 2026; Timeline of Azerbaijani history

This is a list of individuals and events related to Azerbaijan in 2026.

== Incumbents ==
Photo	Post	Name
	President of Azerbaijan	Ilham Aliyev
	Vice President of Azerbaijan	Mehriban Aliyeva
	Prime Minister of Azerbaijan	Ali Asadov
	Speaker of the National Assembly of Azerbaijan	Sahiba Gafarova

== Events ==
=== January ===
- 27 January – The State Security Service announces the arrest of three people accused of plotting an attack on an embassy in Baku on behalf of Islamic State – Khorasan Province.

=== February ===
- 10 February – US vice president JD Vance visits Baku and oversees the signing of a strategic partnership agreement between the United States and Azerbaijan.
- 14 February – President Aliyev publicly accuses Russia of carrying out deliberate attacks against Azerbaijani diplomatic outposts and energy infrastructure in Ukraine.
- 17 February – An Azerbaijani court sentences Ruben Vardanyan, the former State Minister of the Republic of Artsakh, to 20 years' imprisonment.
- 28 February – A magnitude 4.8 earthquake hits Shamakhi District, destroying dozens of buildings.

=== March ===
- 5 March – A suspected Iranian drone attack is carried out at Nakhchivan International Airport and Şəkərabad in Nakhchivan Autonomous Republic, injuring two people.
- 9 March – Azerbaijan reopens its border crossings with Iran to cargo traffic after closing them following the drone incident in Nakhchivan.
- 10 March – Foreign minister Tom Berendsen announces the temporary relocation of staff and operations of the Dutch embassy in Iran to Baku, Azerbaijan, citing security risks to personnel amid the Iranian war.
- 16 March – A court in Baku sentences French businessman Martin Ryan to 10 years' imprisonment on charges of spying.

=== April ===
- 15 April – Russia agrees to provide compensation over its shooting down of Azerbaijan Airlines Flight 8243 in 2024 following negotiations with Azerbaijan.

=== August ===
- 21 August–6 September – 2026 Women's European Volleyball Championship in Azerbaijan, Czech Republic, Sweden and Turkey.
- 25–27 August – Lachin International Film Festival

=== October ===
- 4–11 October – 2026 World Judo Championships in Baku.
- 24–30 October – 2026 FIFA U-15 World Cup & Festival in Baku.

== Holidays ==
- 1–2 January – New Year holidays
- 19–20 January – Martyrs' Day
- 8 March – International Women's Day
- 20–23 April – Ramazan Bayram Holiday
- 20–24 March – Novruz holidays
- 9 May – Victory and Peace Day
- 27–28 May – Qurban Bayramı
- 28 May – Independence Day
- 15 June – National Salvation Day
- 26 June – Armed Forces Day
- 8 November – Victory Day
- 9 November – State Flag Day
- 31 December – International Solidarity Day

== Deaths ==
- 6 January – Baghir Suleimanov, 66, petroleum scientist.
- 15 January – Rafael Gvaladze, 78, judge of the Constitutional Court (1998–2025).
- 21 March – Lala Alizadeh, 81, scientist.
- 16 May – Hajibaba Azimov, 87, member of the Supreme Soviet (1991–1995).
- 9 September – Alexander Sharovsky, 78, actor and theatre director.
- 15 November – Ehtiram Aliyev, 54, colonel (First Nagorno-Karabakh War).
