= 2027 in Azerbaijan =

- Decades: 2000s; 2010s; 2020s
- See also: Other events of 2027; Timeline of Azerbaijani history

This is a list of individuals and events related to Azerbaijan in 2027.

== Events ==
=== Predicted and scheduled events ===
- TBA – 2027 FIFA U-20 World Cup in Azerbaijan and Uzbekistan

== Holidays ==
- 1–2 January – New Year holidays
- 19–20 January – Martyrs' Day
- 8 March – International Women's Day
- 9–10 March – Ramazan Bayram Holiday
- 20–24 March – Novruz holidays
- 9 May – Victory and Peace Day
- 16–18 May – Qurban Bayramı
- 28 May – Independence Day
- 15 June – National Salvation Day
- 26 June – Armed Forces Day
- 8 November – Victory Day
- 9 November – State Flag Day
- 31 December – International Solidarity Day
