= 2025 in Azerbaijan =

- Decades: 2000s; 2010s; 2020s
- See also: Other events of 2025; Timeline of Azerbaijani history

This is a list of individuals and events related to Azerbaijan in 2025.

== Incumbents ==
Photo	Post	Name
	President of Azerbaijan	Ilham Aliyev
	Vice President of Azerbaijan	Mehriban Aliyeva
	Prime Minister of Azerbaijan	Ali Asadov
	Speaker of the National Assembly of Azerbaijan	Sahiba Gafarova

== Events ==
=== January ===
- 18 January – The first case of mpox in Azerbaijan is discovered from a patient in Baku who had travelled abroad.
- 25 January – Two cars collide in Shamkir, killing five people.
- January 29–30 – The SPE Workshop on Enhanced Oil Recovery (EOR) Technologies is held in Baku

=== February ===
- February 6–7 – The IADC Drilling Caspian Conference & Exhibition is held in Baku
- 20 February – The government orders the suspension of operations of the BBC in Azerbaijan.
- February 22 – The Congress for People with Special Needs is held in Heydar Aliyev Centre in Baku
- 24 February – The government orders the closure of the offices of RT in Azerbaijan.

=== May ===
- 4 May – MP Azer Badamov is detained in Astrakhan, Russia amid reports that he had been barred entry by Moscow over allegations of Russophobia.

=== June ===
- 20 June – Seven journalists from Radio Free Europe/Radio Liberty and Abzas Media are sentenced to up to nine years' imprisonment on charges disputed as politically motivated by human rights groups.
- 29 June – The Ministry of Culture cancels all Russian-related cultural events nationwide in response to the deaths of two Azerbaijani nationals during a raid by Russian authorities in Yekaterinburg on 27 June.
- 30 June – Authorities raid the branch of the Russian state media outlet Sputnik in Baku on suspicion of illegal financing despite the revocation of its operating license in Azerbaijan.

=== July ===
- 1 July – Azerbaijan, Kazakhstan, and Uzbekistan sign an agreement in Baku to establish the Green Corridor Union, a joint venture to promote regional green energy cooperation.
- 10 July – President Aliyev meets with Armenian prime minister Nikol Pashinyan in the United Arab Emirates as part of peace negotiations between their countries.
- 12 July – Colonel Arguj Kalantarli, head of the international relations department of the Ministry of Emergency Situations, is elected as Secretary-General of the International Civil Defence Organization (ICDO).

=== August ===
- 2 August – Turkey opens a pipeline to facilitate the distribution of natural gas from Azerbaijan to Syria.
- 8 August – President Aliyev signs a peace agreement with Armenian prime minister Nikol Pashinyan in a ceremony hosted by US president Donald Trump in the White House.

=== October ===
- 9 October – Russian president Vladimir Putin admits that Russian air defenses were responsible for the shooting down of Azerbaijan Airlines Flight 8243 over Chechnya in 2024.

=== November ===
- 22 November – A fire in a residential building in Yasamal raion of Baku leaves three people dead and 20 people hospitalized.
- 29 November – Ali Karimli, the leader of the opposition Azerbaijani Popular Front Party, is arrested on unspecified charges.

== Holidays ==
- 1–2 January – New Year holidays
- 19–20 January – Martyrs' Day
- 8 March – International Women's Day
- 20–24 March – Novruz holidays
- 30 March –1 April – Ramazan Bayram Holiday
- 9 May – Victory and Peace Day
- 28 May – Independence Day
- 6–8 June – Qurban Bayramı
- 15 June – National Salvation Day
- 26 June – Armed Forces Day
- 8 November – Victory Day
- 9 November – State Flag Day
- 31 December – International Solidarity Day

== Deaths ==
- 13 January – Shamsaddin Khanbabayev, 85, prime minister of the Nakhchivan Autonomous Republic (1993–2000).
- 19 July – Soltan Abbas, 92, poet.
