= 2023 in Azerbaijan =

- Decades: 2000s; 2010s; 2020s
- See also: Other events of 2023; Timeline of Azerbaijani history

This is a list of individuals and events related to Azerbaijan in 2023.

== Incumbents ==
Photo	Post	Name
	President of Azerbaijan	Ilham Aliyev
	Vice President of Azerbaijan	Mehriban Aliyeva
	Prime Minister of Azerbaijan	Ali Asadov
	Speaker of the National Assembly of Azerbaijan	Sahiba Gafarova

== Events ==
=== Ongoing ===
- In 2015, Turkey and Azerbaijan agreed to boost mutual trade to US$15 billion by 2023.

=== January ===
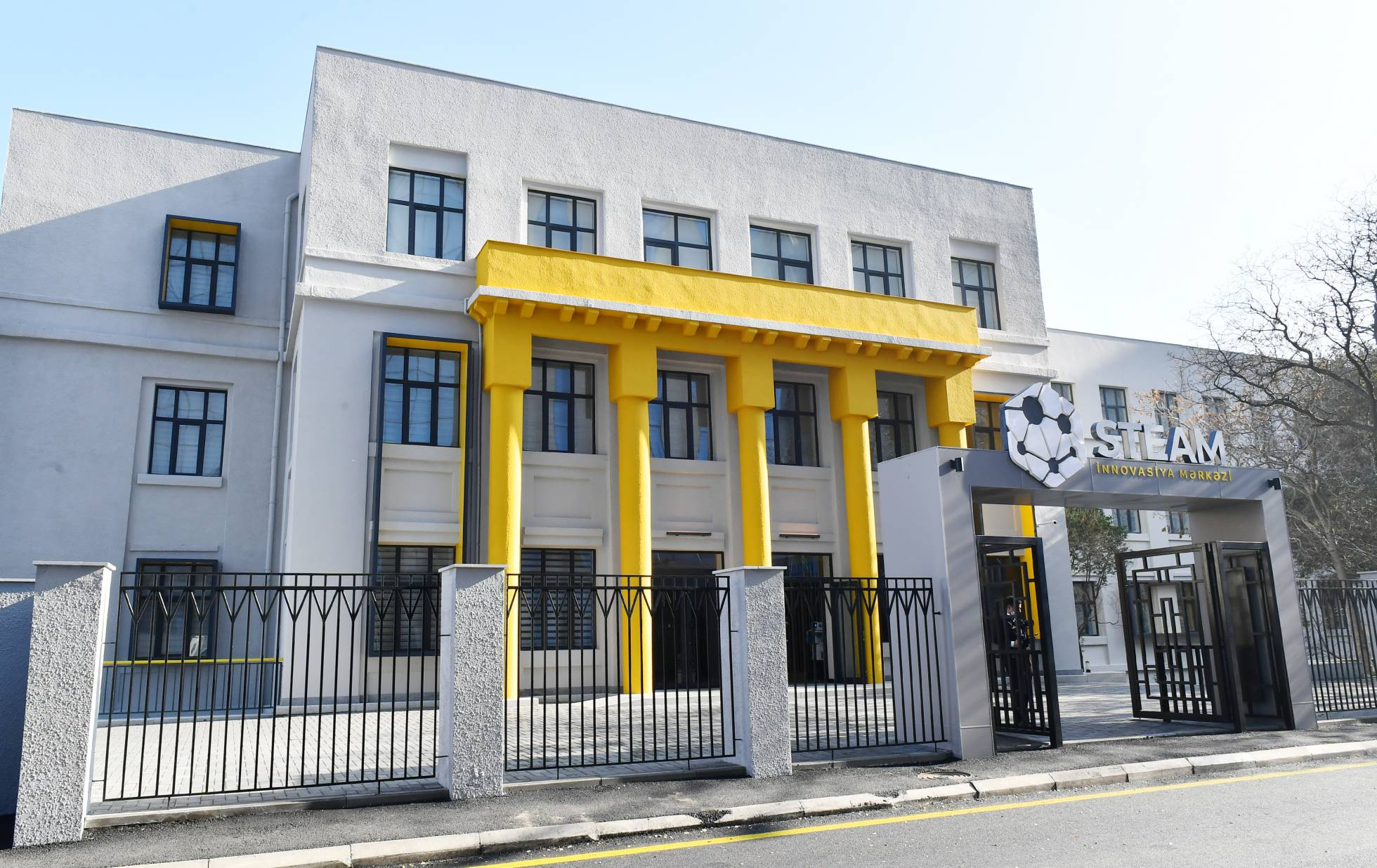
STEAM Innovation Center

Baku SME house

- January 5 — Ilham Aliyev and Mehriban Aliyeva attended inauguration of "STEAM Innovation Center" in the Yasamal raion of Baku.
- January 6 — Ilham Aliyev attended inauguration of "Baku SME house" in Narimanov raion of Baku.
- January 11
  - Italian Minister of Defence Guido Crosetto visited Azerbaijan and met Ilham Aliyev in Baku.
  - Mukhtar Mammadov was appointed ambassador to Israel.
  - The newly appointed ambassador of Azerbaijan to Cuba, Ruslan Rzayev, presented his credentials to the President of Cuba, Miguel Díaz-Canel.
- January 14
  - The newly appointed ambassador of Azerbaijan to France, Leyla Abdullayeva, presented her credentials to President of France, Emmanuel Macron.
  - The newly appointed ambassador of Azerbaijan to the Vatican, Ilgar Mukhtarov, presented his credentials to head of the Catholic Church, Pope Francis.
- January 15 — Ilham Aliyev visited the UAE and met President of the UAE Mohammed bin Zayed Al Nahyan in Abu Dhabi.
- January 22 — Four people are killed and six others are injured in a fire at a two-story cottage in Qusar.
- January 29 — Azerbaijan suspends diplomatic activities at its embassy in Tehran after accusing Iran of failing to ensure the security of its embassy staff.

=== February ===
- 16 February – Armenia submits a peace treaty to Azerbaijan in an effort to end the decades-long conflict between the two countries.

=== March ===
- 5 March – Nagorno-Karabakh conflict: Three Armenian police officers and two Azerbaijani soldiers are killed during border clashes near the Lachin Corridor. Both nations accuse each other of opening fire first.
- 25 March – The Ministry of Defence in Russia accuses Azerbaijan of violating the 2020 ceasefire agreement after a unit of the Azerbaijani Armed Forces crosses the Line of Contact in Shushi Province, Artsakh, and seizes control of dirt roads near the Lachin corridor.
- 28 March – Fazil Mustafa, an opposition member of Azerbaijan's National Assembly, is shot multiple times outside his home in Baku by unknown assailants in an assassination attempt. Mustafa's condition is described as satisfactory, and his life is not reported to be in danger.

=== April ===
April 28 — April 30 — 2023 Azerbaijan Grand Prix

=== May ===
Caspian Oil & Gas Show is held in Baku Expo Center Baku on 31 May to 2 June 2023 showing the companies news of Azerbaijan and internationals related to sectors.

=== July ===
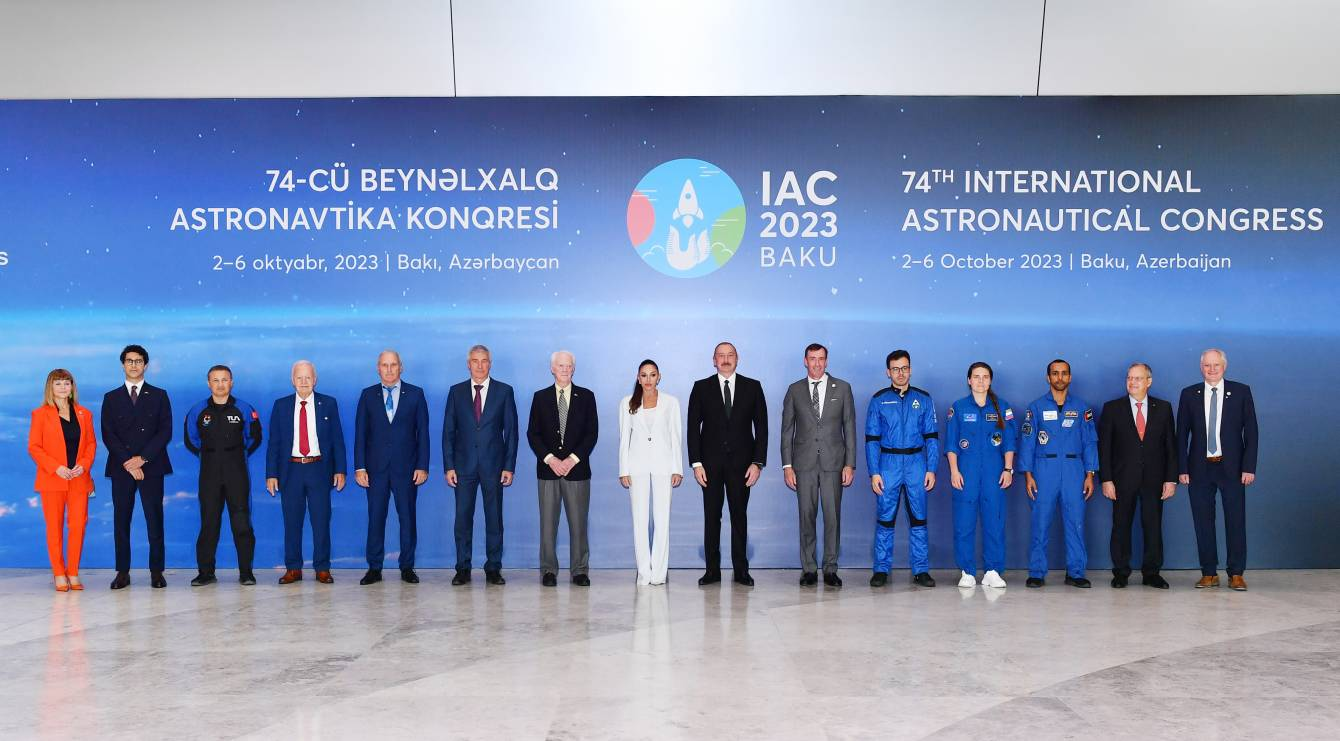
International Astronautical Congress 2023

- 3 July – An M_{w} 5.4 offshore earthquake struck 50 km (31 mi) northwest of Khachmaz. No casualties were reported.
- 11 July – Azerbaijan's State Border Service temporarily shuts down the Lachin corridor, the only road between Armenia and the disputed Nagorno-Karabakh region, alleging smuggling by the Armenian Red Cross Society.
- 17 July –Azerbaijan's State Border Service reopens the Lachin corridor to allow the Red Cross to conduct medical evacuations from Nagorno-Karabakh to Armenia amid protests over the corridor's closure on July 11 and humanitarian concerns.

=== September ===
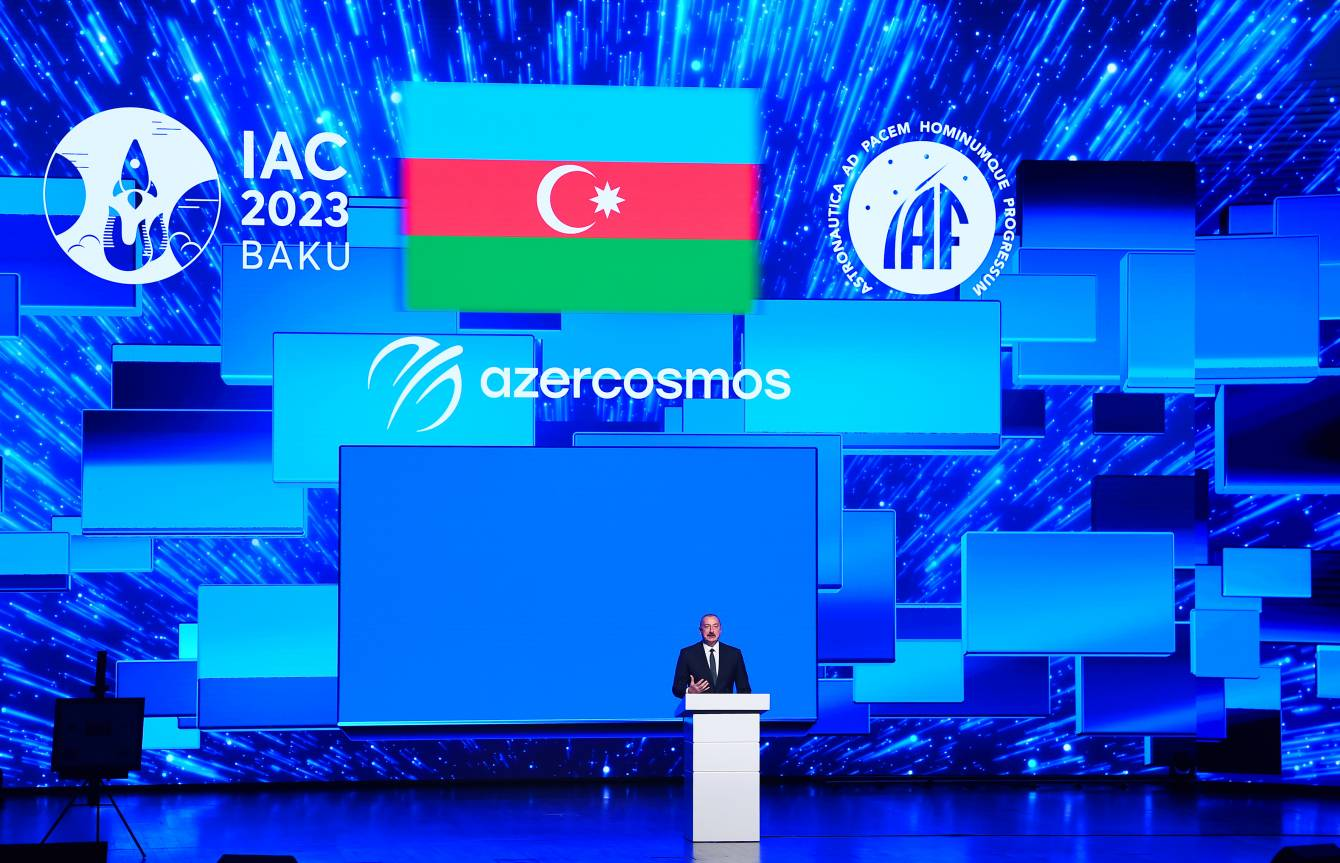
International Astronautical Congress 2023

- 19 September –
  - Four Azerbaijani police officers and two civilians are killed by separate mine explosions in Nagorno-Karabakh, with Azerbaijan blaming Armenian sabotage groups.
  - Azerbaijan launches an offensive on Nagorno-Karabakh and demands the withdrawal of ethnic Armenian forces from the region.
  - The Presidential Administration of Azerbaijan says that Armenia must hand over all weapons in order to stop "anti-terrorism" activities.
  - Azerbaijan claims its forces broke through the contact line and captured over 60 military posts in Nagorno-Karabakh. Artsakh forces, however, deny this.
  - According to the Republic of Artsakh government, 25 people, including a child, are killed due to the fighting, and 138 others are injured. Azerbaijan claims that one civilian was killed by shelling in Shusha.
  - Azerbaijani forces strike Stepanakert, the de facto capital of Nagorno-Karabakh, with artillery, damaging several residential buildings.
- September 20 –
  - Armenian separatist forces in Nagorno-Karabakh surrender and agree to a Russian proposal for a ceasefire with Azerbaijan effective from 1 pm on Wednesday.
  - Azerbaijan calls for the "total surrender" of ethnic Armenian forces in Nagorno-Karabakh, and orders the Republic of Artsakh government to dissolve itself, saying its military offensive will continue until the region is under its full control.
  - Peace talks between Azerbaijan and the separatists are set for the following day in Yevlakh. Russia's peacekeeping contingent will assist in coordinating the ceasefire.
  - Thousands of Artsakh residents gather at Stepanakert Airport, where some Russian peacekeepers are stationed, seeking evacuation.
- September 21 – Delegates of Azerbaijan and Artsakh meet in the Azeri city of Yevlakh. No formal agreement is adopted after two hours of talks.
- September 27 –
  - Azerbaijan reports that 192 of its troops were killed and more than 500 others were injured during last week's offensive on Nagorno-Karabakh.
  - Former State Minister of Artsakh Ruben Vardanyan is arrested by Azerbaijan after attempting to cross the border into Armenia.
- September 29 – Samvel Shahramanyan, president of the breakaway Republic of Artsakh, signs a decree to dissolve all state institutions of Artsakh beginning at the start of 2024.

=== October ===
- October-23-25 - Caspian Air Cargo Summit 2023 is the largest and most comprehensive aviation event in the region, bringing the international air cargo market leaders to Baku.

=== November ===
- November 17 – The International Court of Justice orders Azerbaijan to facilitate the "safe, unimpeded, and expeditious" return of displaced people to Nagorno-Karabakh, following the country's offensive, and to ensure freedom of movement for those wishing to leave or remain in the region.
- November 29 - Baku will host Azerbaijan Fashion Week on December 3. The event is organised with the support of the Culture Ministry as part of the Creative Week to be held from November 29 to December.

=== December ===
- December 7 – An exhibition of winning sports cars was held in front of the Heydar Aliyev Center in Baku as part of the FIA.
- 8 December – Armenia and Azerbaijan agree to exchange prisoners of war and work towards a peace treaty to formally end the Nagorno-Karabakh conflict and normalize relations.

== Sports ==
Major sports events on the 2023 sporting calendar include Chess World Cup, U22 European Boxing Championship, FIBA European Youth Championships 2023 (U 18, C division), numerous gymnastics events, and much more.

Azerbaijan will host Chess World Cup for the second time. Baku hosted the World Cup for the first time in 2015.

- 2022–23 Azerbaijan Premier League
- UEFA Euro 2024 qualifying Group F

== Deaths ==
=== January ===
- January 3 — Sayyad Shairov, poet (b. 1945)
- January 4 — Neron Babakhanov, doctor of geography, professor (b. 1939)
- January 5 — Mahir Muradov, judge of the Constitutional Court of Azerbaijan (b. 1956)
- January 7 — Ahmad Gasimov, statesman, deputy (b. 1940)
- January 10
  - Nadir Mammadov, doctor of geography, professor (b. 1941)
  - Geys Sultanov, scientist, doctor of physical and mathematical sciences, professor (b. 1939)
- January 11 — Mehdi Mukarramoglu, journalist (b. 1952)
- January 16 — Seyfeddin Ganiyev, folklorist, doctor of philological sciences, professor (b. 1952)
- January 17 — Namiq Nasrullayev, politician, minister of economy, 1st chairman of the Chamber of Accounts (b. 1945)
- January 22 — Tunzale Aliyeva, actress (b. 1973)
