= 2024 in Azerbaijan =

- Decades: 2000s; 2010s; 2020s
- See also: Other events of 2024; Timeline of Azerbaijani history

This is a list of individuals and events related to Azerbaijan in 2024. In the Republic of Azerbaijan, 2024 was ordered the "Year of Solidarity for the Green World" by the Presidential order.

== Incumbents ==
Photo	Post	Name
	President of Azerbaijan	Ilham Aliyev
	Vice President of Azerbaijan	Mehriban Aliyeva
	Prime Minister of Azerbaijan	Ali Asadov
	Speaker of the National Assembly of Azerbaijan	Sahiba Gafarova

== Events ==
=== January ===
- 1 January – The Republic of Artsakh in the disputed Nagorno-Karabakh region ceases to exist, joining Azerbaijan.

=== February ===
- 7 February – 2024 Azerbaijani presidential election. President Ilham Aliyev wins reelection with more than 92% of the vote.

=== March ===
- 19 March – Armenian Prime Minister Nikol Pashinyan says he has received an ultimatum from Azerbaijan to return disputed areas or face war.
- 26 March – Former Kyrgyzstan deputy Raimbek Matraimov is detained in Baku and is extradited to Bishkek.

=== April ===
- 17 April – Russia begins the withdrawal of its peacekeepers from Nagorno-Karabakh.

=== May ===
- 3 May – U.S. Representative Henry Cuellar is indicted for accepting over $600,000 worth of bribes from Azerbaijan.
- 24 May – Azerbaijan regains control of the disputed border villages of Bağanis Ayrum (Baghanis), Aşağı Əskipara (Voskepar), Xeyrimli (Kirants) and Qızılhacılı (Berkaber) from Armenia as part of efforts towards a final peace agreement.

=== June ===
- 12 June – Russia completes the withdrawal of its peacekeepers from Nagorno-Karabakh.

=== July ===
- 15 July – Azerbaijan reopens its embassy in Iran following efforts to repair relations strained since 2023.

=== August ===
- 20 August – Azerbaijan formally applies to join the BRICS economic bloc following a meeting between President Ilham Aliyev and Russian President Vladimir Putin in Baku. Aliyev also approves US$120 million to expand Russian–Azerbaijani cargo trade.

=== September ===
- 1 September – 2024 Azerbaijani parliamentary election: The ruling New Azerbaijan Party of President Aliyev secures a narrow majority of 68 of 125 seats in the National Assembly.

=== October ===
- 1 October – Exiled opposition activist Vidadi Isgandarli dies from wounds sustained from an attack inside his apartment in Mulhouse, France on 29 September.

=== November ===
- 11–22 November – 2024 United Nations Climate Change Conference in Baku.
- 29 November - Detention of the journalist Aziz Orujov.

=== December ===
- 6 December – Six journalists including five working for the Germany-based media outlet Meydan TV are arrested in Baku on charges of smuggling.
- 25 December – Azerbaijan Airlines Flight 8243, an Embraer ERJ-190AR carrying 67 people, crashes in Aktau, Kazakhstan, killing 38 people on board. President Aliyev subsequently accuses Russia of unintentionally shooting down the aircraft.
- 29 December – The upper age limit for conscription into the Azerbaijani Armed Forces is reduced from 35 to 30.

== Holidays ==
- 1–2 January – New Year holidays
- 19–20 January – Martyrs' Day
- 8 March – International Women's Day
- 20–24 March – Novruz holidays
- 10–11 April – Ramazan Bayram Holiday
- 9 May – Victory and Peace Day
- 28 May – Independence Day
- 15 June – National Salvation Day
- 16–17 June – Qurban Bayramı
- 26 June – Armed Forces Day
- 8 November – Victory Day
- 9 November – State Flag Day
- 31 December – International Solidarity Day
