= Public holidays in Azerbaijan =

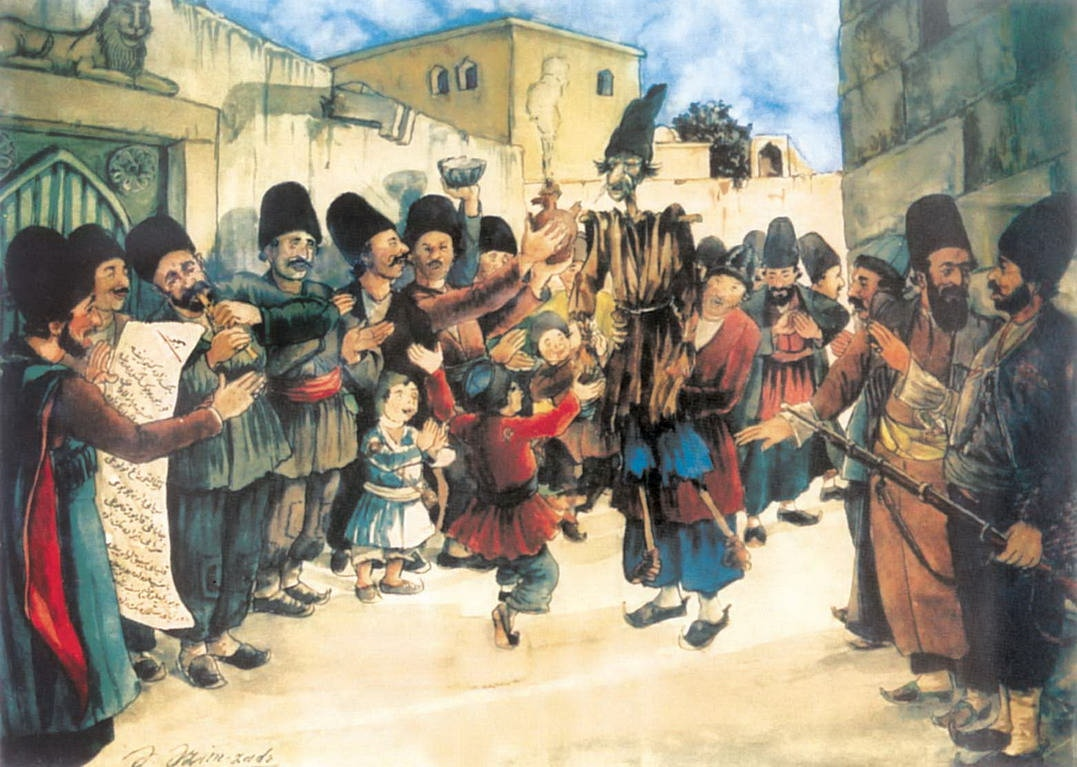
Holiday in an Azerbaijani village, 1930s. Work by Azim Azimzade.

There are several public holidays in Azerbaijan. Public holidays were regulated in the constitution of the Azerbaijan SSR for the first time on 19 May 1921. They are now regulated by the Constitution of Azerbaijan.

== Holidays ==
=== Main holidays ===
Date	English name	Azerbaijani name	Remarks
1–2 January	New Year's Day	Yeni il	2 days
20 January	National Mourning Day	Ümumxalq Hüzn Günü	Commemorates Black January (1990) when Soviet troops entered Baku and killed more than 130 civilians.
8 March	Women's Day	Qadınlar günü	1 day
20–24 March	Nowruz	Novruz	Persian New Year (5 days)
9 May	Victory Day over Fascism	Faşizm üzərinə qələbə günü	In honor of victory of the USSR over Nazi Germany during World War II.
28 May	Independence Day	Müstəqillik Günü	Founding of the Democratic Republic of Azerbaijan (1918).
15 June	National Salvation Day	Azərbaycan xalqının Milli Qurtuluş günü	Parliament invited Heydar Aliyev to Baku to lead the country (1993).
26 June	Azerbaijan Armed Forces Day	Azərbaycan Respublikasının Silahlı Qüvvələri günü	Commemorates the founding of the Azerbaijani National Army on this day in 1918.
8 November	Victory Day	Zəfər Günü	Commemorates the Azerbaijani victory in the 2020 Nagorno-Karabakh war as well as in the Battle of Shusha. It is a non-working day.
9 November	State Flag Day	Dövlət Bayrağı günü	Commemorates the adoption of the Flag of Azerbaijan on November 9, 1918, which was officially established on November 9, 2009, as the State Flag Day.
31 December	International Solidarity Day of Azerbaijanis	Dünya Azərbaycanlılarının Həmrəyliyi günü	Inspired by the fall of the Berlin Wall, the nationalist Popular Front of Azerbaijan called for and lead the removal of borders between Soviet Azerbaijan and Iran on December 31, 1989. This has since been celebrated by Azerbaijanis around the world as the International Solidarity Day of Azerbaijanis.
1-2 Shawwal	Eid al-Fitr	Ramazan Bayramı	2 days
1-2 Dhu al-Hijjah	Eid al-Adha	Qurban Bayramı	2 days

=== Other observances ===
National days in Azerbaijan that are working days follows:

- 30 January – Day of Azerbaijani customs
- 2 February – Day of Youth in Azerbaijan
- 11 February – Day of Revenue Service
- 14 February – Day of the Air Force
- 26 February – Khojaly massacre commemoration day
- 5 March – Day of Physical Culture and Sport
- 10 March – Day of National Theatre/Golden Crescent Day
- 12 March – Day of Internal Troops
- 16 March – Day of Employees of the State Agency for the Protection of Strategic Facilities
- 19 March – Day of Migration Service Employees
- 27 March – Science Day
- 28 March – Day of National Security
- 31 March – Day of Genocide of Azerbaijanis
- 10 April – Day of the builder
- 10 May – Flower Festival
- 23 May – Day of the Ministry of Environment and Natural Resources
- 2 June – Day of Civil Aviation
- 5 June – Day of Water Resources and Land Reclamation Workers
- 18 June – Human Rights Day
- 20 June – Day of the gas sector
- 23 June – Day of Civil Servants
- 2 July – Day of Azerbaijani Police
- 9 July – Day of the employees of the diplomatic service
- 22 July – National Press Day in Azerbaijan
- 1 August – National Language Day
- 2 August – National Day of Azerbaijani Cinema
- 5 August – Day of the Navy
- 18 August – Day of Border Troops
- 23 August – Day of the Security Service of the President of Azerbaijan
- 15 September – Day of Knowledge
- 18 September – Day of National Music
- 20 September – Day of Azerbaijani Oil / Oil Workers' Day
- 20 September – State Sovereignty Day
- 26 September – Day of the State Service for Special Communications and Information Security
- 27 September – Remembrance Day
- 29 September – Day of Tourism Workers
- 1 October – Day of Prosecutors in Azerbaijan
- 10 October – Day of Firefighters
- 13 October – Day of Azerbaijani Railway
- 18 October – Day of Restoration of Independence
- 20 October – Day of Energy Workers
- 6 November – Day of Baku Metro Employees/Day of Radio and Television
- 12 November – Constitution Day
- 17 November – National Revival Day
- 22 November – Day of Justice of Azerbaijan
- 6 December – Day of the Ministry of Communications and Information Technologies of Azerbaijan
- 12 December – Memorial Day of Heydar Aliyev
- 16 December – Day of Azerbaijani Ministry of Emergency Situations
- 17 December – Day of the Ministry of Defence Industry
- 28 December – Lawyer's Day
- 29 December – Day of the State Agency for Public Services

=== Religious days ===
Only the holidays of Ramadan and Qurban remain as non-working religious days in Azerbaijan, as the country is highly secular and irreligious. The religious population of the country, mainly in Nardaran and a number of other villages and regions, celebrate the Day of Ashura, a Shia mourning day in the Islamic calendar. Religious minorities of the country – mainly Orthodox Christians and Jews - also celebrate notable religious days of their faith. Despite the fact that the holiday Novruz takes its roots from the religion of Zoroastrianism, almost all Azerbaijanis celebrate it as a holiday of spring.
