= Gvaladze =

Gvaladze or more correct Ghvaladze (Georgian: ღვალაძე) is a Georgian family name which is – apart from the capital Tbilisi – most frequently found in the central Imereti and Shida Kartli and the eastern Kakheti regions of Georgia. Most Ghvaladzes live in the Tbilisi (239), Chiatura (224), Kareli (104) and Lagodekhi (86) districts.

== Notable members ==
- Evgen Gvaladze (1900–1937), Georgian lawyer, journalist and politician
- Guranda Gvaladze (1932–2020), Georgian botanist
- Rafael Gvaladze (1948–2026), Azerbaijani jurist
- Varlam Ghvaladze (1893–1944), Georgian biochemist and teacher
