= Badambura =

Azerbaijani sweet pastry

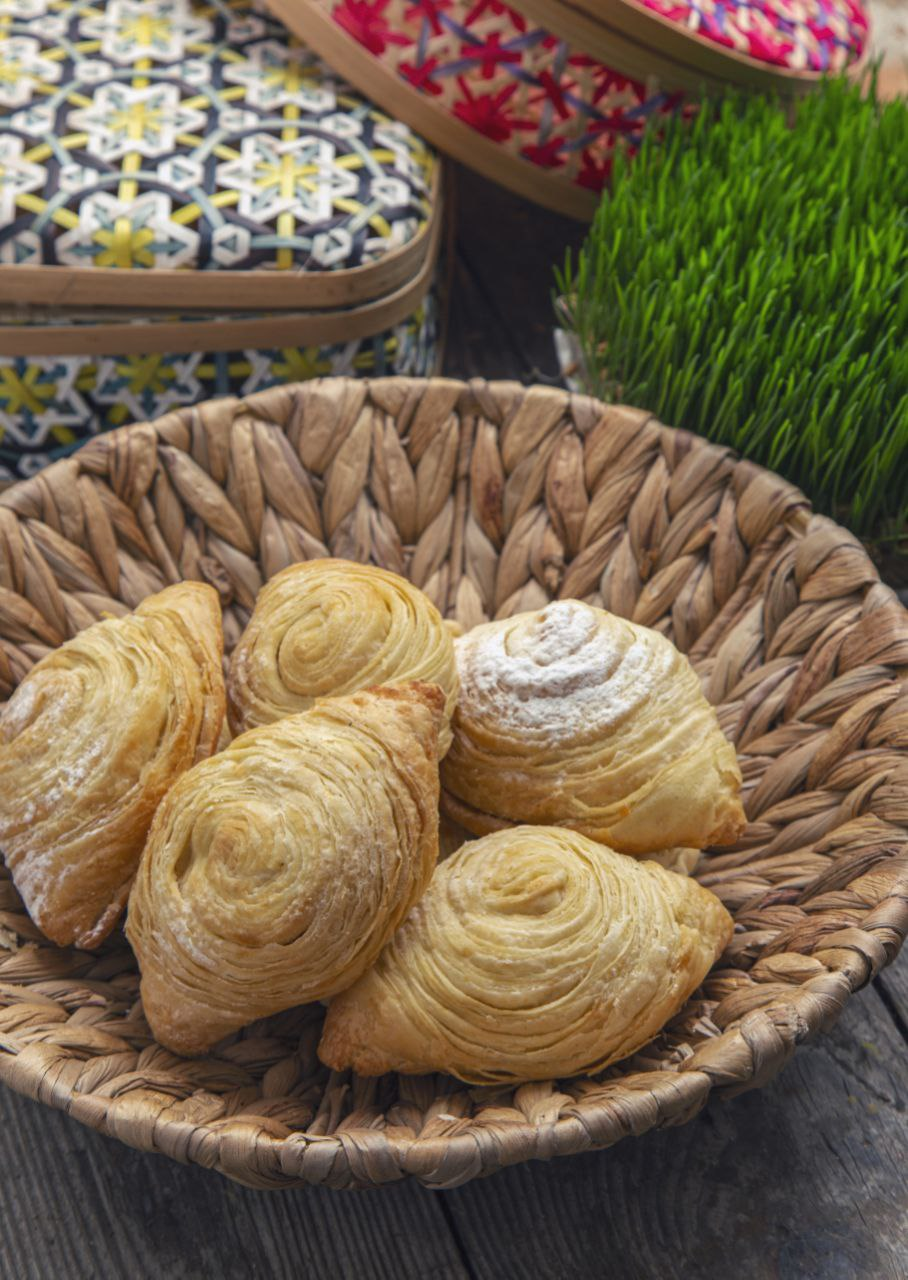
- Type: Pastry
- Place of origin: Azerbaijan
- Associated cuisine: Azerbaijani

Badambura is an Azerbaijani sweet pastry, usually eaten as a dessert, especially when celebrating Nowruz.

It consists of several layers of soft, flaky dough and is filled with almonds, sugar and cardamom. It is also topped with powdered sugar.

== Preparation ==
The dough is made of wheat flour, butter, milk, egg yolks, cream, and yeast. The filling contains pistachios, crystal sugar, butter and cardamom. The dough is kneaded and when ready, divided into multiple portions, preferably 40 grams. The portions are then rolled out and filled. They are then baked at a low temperature and topped with powdered sugar.
