= Namig Nasrullayev =

Azerbaijani politician (1945–2023)

Namiq Nasrullayev

Chairman of the Chamber of Accounts of the Republic of Azerbaijan
- In office 12 June 2001 – 17 April 2007
- Preceded by: position established
- Succeeded by: Heydar Asadov

Minister of Economy
- In office 18 November 1996 – 30 April 2001
- Preceded by: Samad Sadigov
- Succeeded by: Farhad Aliyev

Personal details
- Born: Namiq Nasrulla oğlu Nasrullayev; 2 February 1945 Azerbaijan SSR, USSR
- Died: 17 January 2023 (aged 77) Baku, Azerbaijan
- Education: Azerbaijan State Oil and Industry University; Moscow State University
- Occupation: Mathematician

Namiq Nasrulla oğlu Nasrullayev (Azerbaijani: Namiq Nəsrulla oğlu Nəsrullayev; 2 February 1945 – 17 January 2023) was an Azerbaijani mathematician and politician. He served as Minister of Economy from 1996 to 2001 and chairman of the Chamber of Accounts from 2001 to 2007.

Nasrullayev died in Baku on 17 January 2023, at the age of 77.
