= Remembrance Day (Azerbaijan) =

Public holiday in Azerbaijan

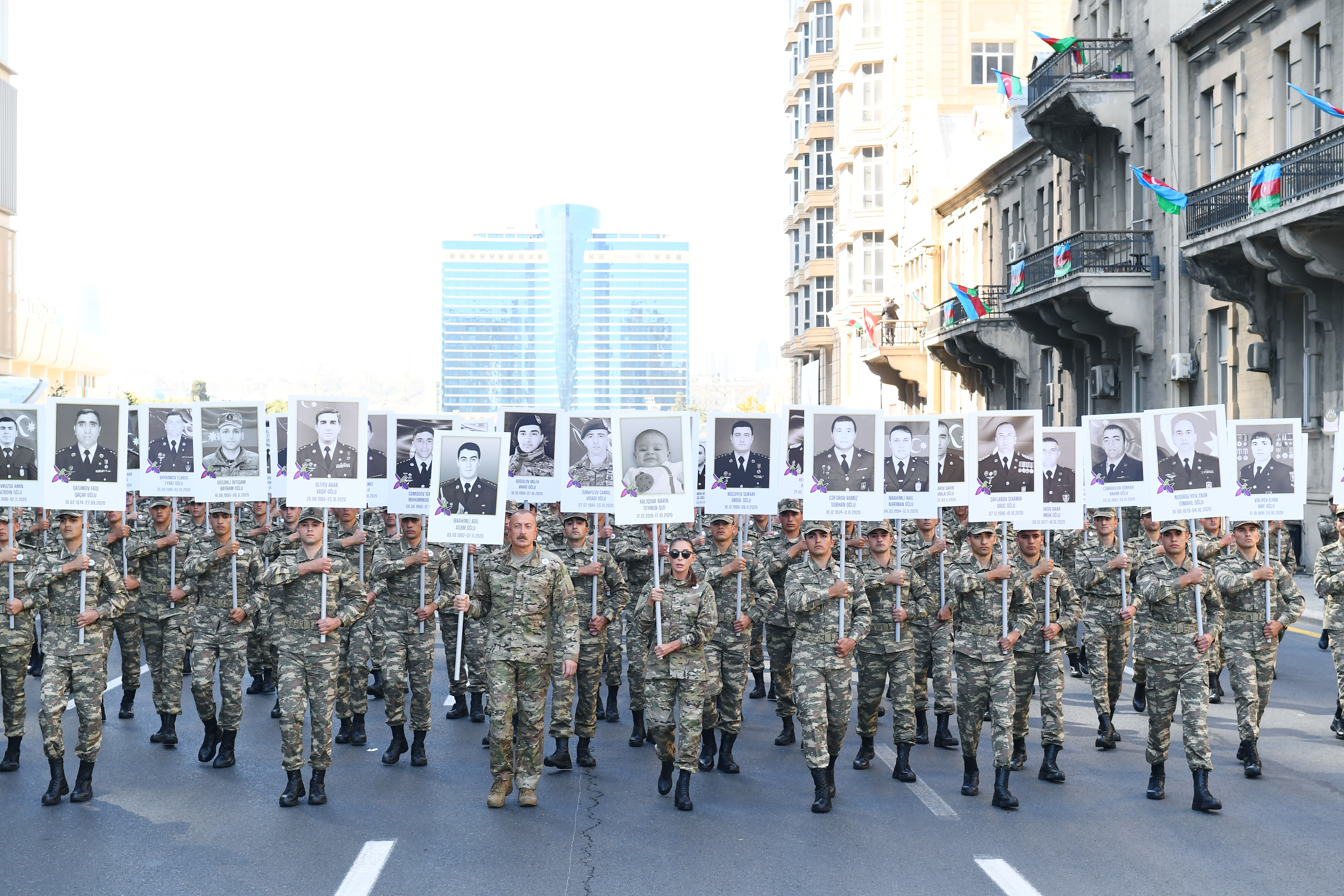
- Official name: Azerbaijani: Azərbaycanda Anım Günü
- Also called: Remembrance Day in Azerbaijan
- Observed by: Azerbaijan
- Type: National day of mourning
- Significance: Honoring and mourning the military personnel who have died while serving in the Azerbaijani Armed Forces during the Second Nagorno-Karabakh War
- Date: 27 September
- Next time: 27 September 2026
- Frequency: Annual
- Related to: Second Nagorno-Karabakh War

The Remembrance Day in Azerbaijan (Azerbaijani: Azərbaycanda Anım Günü) is a national day of mourning in Azerbaijan dedicated to the military personnel of the Azerbaijani Armed Forces who perished during the Second Nagorno-Karabakh War, officially labelled as The Patriotic War. Established by presidential decree on 2 December 2020, the Remembrance Day is held on 27 September, the day when the war began.

During the war, the government of Azerbaijan did not reveal the number of its military casualties. On 3 December, Azerbaijan stated that 2,783 of its soldiers had been killed during the war.

== History ==
=== Background ===
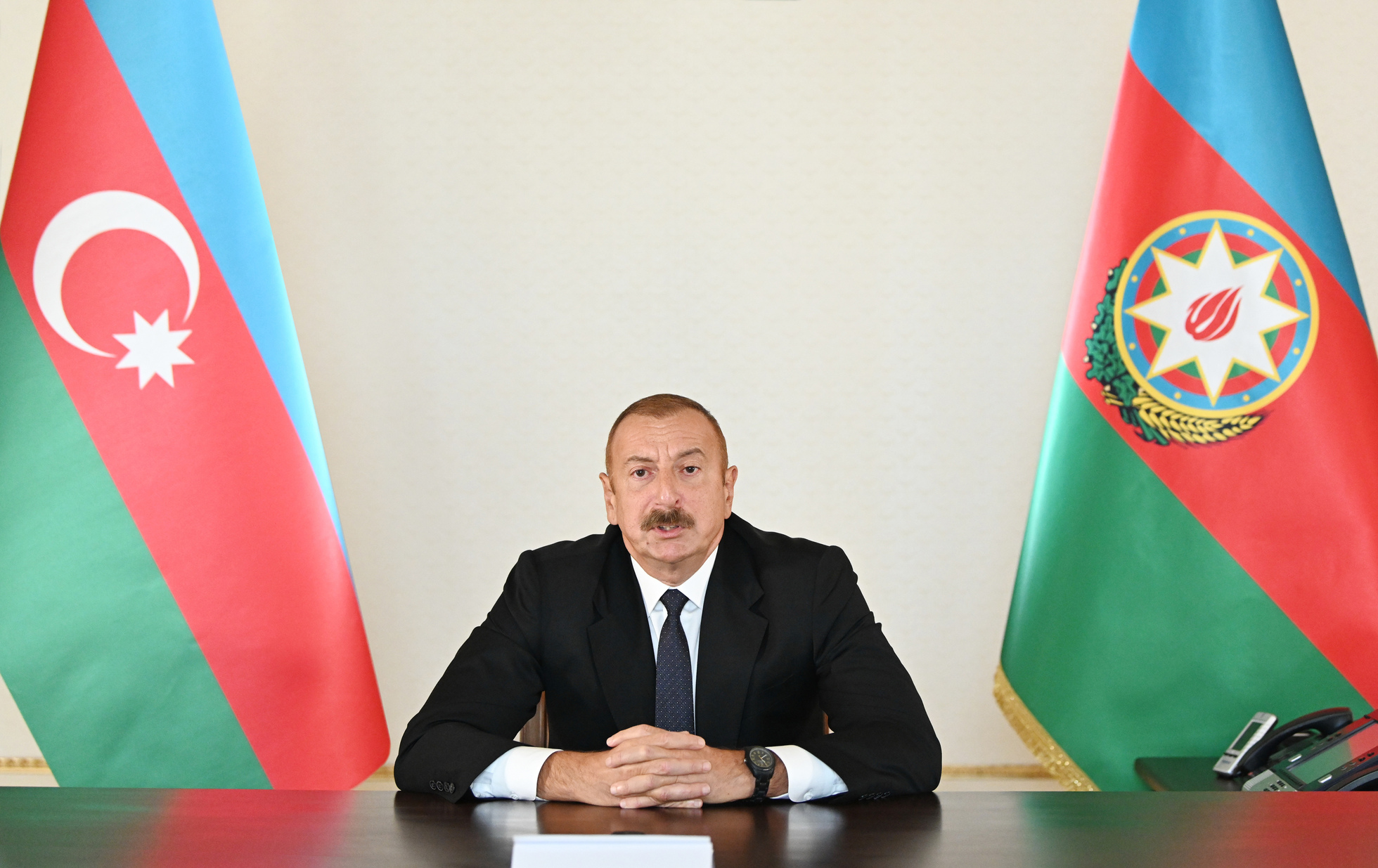
The President of Azerbaijan, Ilham Aliyev, addressing the nation on the morning of 27 September 2020, the day the war began.

On 27 September 2020, clashes broke out in the disputed Nagorno-Karabakh region, which was de facto controlled by the self-proclaimed and unrecognized Republic of Artsakh, but de jure part of Azerbaijan. Azerbaijani forces first advanced in Fuzuli and Jabrayil districts, taking their respective administrative centres. From there, they proceeded towards Hadrut. Azerbaijani troops began to advance more intensively after the fall of Hadrut around 15 October, and Armenians began to retreat, with Azerbaijanis then taking control of Zangilan and Qubadli. Launching an offensive for Lachin, they also penetrated into Shushi District through its forests and mountain passes.

Following the capture of Shusha, the second-largest settlement in Nagorno-Karabakh, a ceasefire agreement was signed between the President of Azerbaijan, Ilham Aliyev, the Prime Minister of Armenia, Nikol Pashinyan, and the President of Russia, Vladimir Putin, ending all hostilities in the area from 00:00, 10 November 2020 Moscow Time. Under the agreement, the warring sides will keep control of their currently held areas within Nagorno-Karabakh, while Armenia will return the surrounding territories it occupied in 1994 to Azerbaijan. Azerbaijan will also gain land access to its Nakhchivan exclave bordering Turkey and Iran. Approximately 2,000 Russian soldiers will be deployed as peacekeeping forces along the Lachin corridor between Armenia and Nagorno-Karabakh for a mandate of at least five years.

During the war, the government of Azerbaijan did not reveal the number of its military casualties. On 3 December, Azerbaijan stated that 2,783 of its soldiers had been killed during the war.

=== Institution ===
On 2 December 2020, the President of Azerbaijan, Ilham Aliyev, signed a decree on the establishment of Remembrance Day as a public holiday in Azerbaijan. The day of the Second Nagorno-Karabakh War began, 27 September, was to be commemorated in Azerbaijan as the Remembrance Day, for honoring and mourning the military personnel who have died while serving in the Azerbaijani Armed Forces during the war.

== See also ==
- Khojaly Genocide Day
- Victory Day (Azerbaijan)
- Public holidays in Azerbaijan
