= Mahir Muradov =

Azerbaijani judge (1956–2023)

Judge of the Constitutional Court of Azerbaijan
- In office 16 October 2012 – 5 January 2023

Personal details
- Born: Mahir Cümşüd oğlu Muradov; 25 July 1956 Baku, Azerbaijan SSR, USSR
- Died: 5 January 2023 (aged 66) Baku, Azerbaijan
- Education: Baku State University
- Occupation: Judge

Mahir Cümşüd oğlu Muradov (25 July 1956 – 5 January 2023) was an Azerbaijani judge. He served on the Constitutional Court of Azerbaijan from 2012 to 2023.

Muradov died in Baku on 5 January 2023, at the age of 66.
