= Alexander Sharovsky =

Azerbaijani actor and theatre director (1948–2026)

- Александр Шаровский (Russian); Aleksandr Şarovski (Azerbaijani)
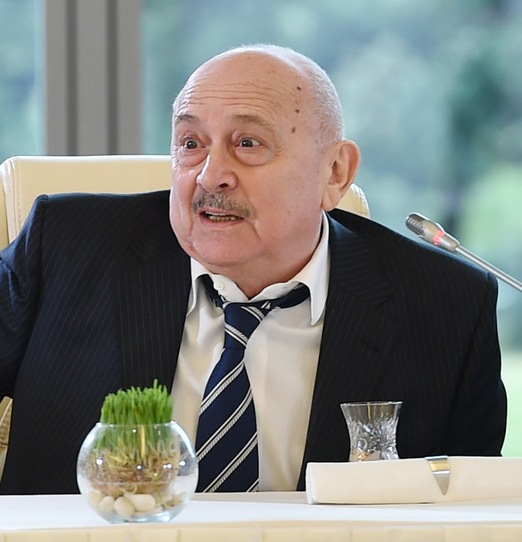
- Born: 10 February 1948; Baku, Azerbaijan SSR, Soviet Union
- Died: 9 September 2026; Baku, Azerbaijan
- Occupations: Actor, theatre director
- Years active: 1967–2026
- Awards

Alexander Yakovlevich Sharovsky (Russian: Александр Яковлевич Шаровский, Azerbaijani: Aleksandr Yakovleviç Şarovski, 10 February 1948 – 9 September 2026) was an Azerbaijani actor and theatre director, who was chief director of the Azerbaijan State Academic Russian Drama Theatre. He was also recognised as a People's Artiste of Azerbaijan (1998), and was head of the community of European Jews in Baku.

== Life and career ==
Alexander Sharovsky was born in Baku on 10 February 1948. In 1973, he graduated from Azerbaijan State Institute of Foreign Languages.

From 1967 to his death in 2026, He was an actor at the Azerbaijan State Theatre of Young Spectators, and from 1976 to his death, he continued his work at the Azerbaijan State Academic Russian Drama Theatre, where he was first an actor, then, from 1978 to 1990, an assistant director, and a production director from 11 June 1991. He was the chief director of the theater from 3 February 1993 until his death.

During these years, he played more than 50 roles on stage, appeared in 4 movies, and staged 54 plays.

He was a member of the Board of Trustees of the Baku International Center for Multiculturalism.

AlexanderrSharovsky died in Baku on 9 September 2026, at the age of 78, after a long illness. He was buried in the Second Alley of Honor.

== Awards ==
- People's Artiste of Azerbaijan – 24 May 1998
- Honored Artist of the Azerbaijan SSR – 20 March 1987
- Sharaf Order – 9 February 2018
- Shohrat Order – 5 February 2008
- Order of Friendship – 11 May 2021
- Medal of Pushkin – 19 January 2013
- Honorary Diploma of President (Azerbaijan) – 9 February 2023
- Humay Award
- Golden Dervish Award
