= Baghir Suleimanov =

Azerbaijani petroleum scientist and academic (1959–2026)

- Bağır Süleymanov
- Born: 22 June 1959; Baku, Azerbaijan SSR, Soviet Union
- Died: 6 January 2026 (aged 66)
- Citizenship: Azerbaijan
- Scientific career
- Fields: Petroleum, reservoir, engineering
- Workplaces: Oil Gas Scientific Research Project Institute, SOCAR

Baghir Suleimanov (Azerbaijani: Bağır Ələkbər oğlu Süleymanov; 22 June 1959 – 6 January 2026) was an Azerbaijani petroleum scientist and academic. A Doctor of Technical Sciences, he was a Corresponding Member of the Azerbaijan National Academy of Sciences.

== Early life and career ==
Suleimanov was born in Baku on 22 June 1959. He graduated from the Azerbaijan State Oil and Industry University. He received his PhD in 1987, his DSc in 1997, and his professorship in 2011. In 2014, he was chosen corresponding member of the Azerbaijan National Academy of Sciences (ANAS) on the specialization of "Development of oil and gas fields", and in 2019, he was elected foreign member of the Russian Academy of Natural Sciences. He attended the scientific school of academician Azad Mirzajanzade.

From 1981 to 1985, Suleimanov worked as an operator and engineer on oil and gas production in the Oil and Gas Production Unit named after N. Narimanov. He worked as an assistant at the Azerbaijan Oil and Chemical Institute's "Development and exploitation of oil fields" faculty from 1985 to 1988, and as a senior, lead, and head scientist at the ANAS Institute of Mathematics and Mechanics' "Nonlinear mechanics of oil and gas" department from 1988 to 2000. Since 2000, he worked at the SOCAR «OilGasScientificResearchProject» Institute as director and deputy director. Since 2009 he was working as deputy director for oil and gas production at the same Institute.

The construction of scientific and experimental basis for the use of heterogeneous systems in the development of oil fields, as well as the development of novel methodologies, technologies, and chemical compositions for oil recovery, was the major focus of B. Suleimanov's research activities.

Suleimanov wrote 321 scientific publications, including 118 patents, two monographs, and four textbooks. He mentored 25 PhD students and 6 DSc students.

== Scientific activity ==
- In the development of oil fields, based on the physical and mathematical modeling of the filtration of heterogeneous systems in non-homogeneous porous media, novel technologies for increasing the oil recovery, bottom-hole stimulation and water shut off have been developed and successfully applied;
- The existence of the S-shaped filtration law during the flow of non-Newtonian fluids in non-homogeneous layers is determined, experimentally and theoretically justified;
- As a result of a comprehensive study of the stationary and non-stationary filtration of gaseous Newtonian, non-Newtonian fluids and gas under pre-critical phase conditions, the theory of flow of the studied systems based on the slip effect in the porous medium was developed;
- As a result of the statistical modeling of the life cicle of oil fields, the methodology of dividing the development process into stages, determining the maximum production and recoverable resources was developed;
- Based on the use of fractal, multifractal dimensions and Fisher-Shannon indicators, new methods of oil field development analysis were developed and applied;
- Methods of selecting candidate wells for the application of various geological-technical measures have been developed based on mathematical modeling;
- As a result of modeling various technological processes in oil production wells, new types of well equipment - submersible pumps, workover equipment, sand screens, etc. have been developed and successfully applied;
- Various oil industry chemicals, such as demulsifiers, depressants, surfactants, polymers compositions were created and effectively employed.

== Scientific achievements ==
- Ranked among the World's Top 2% Scientists, the prestigious list of the world's most influential people in science;
- h-index - 31, i10-index - 72 based on citations given to scientific works;
- More than 500 thousand tons of oil and gas (in oil equivalent) were produced as a result of the application of developed techniques and technologies.

== Membership in scientific and engineering institutions ==
- Corresponding member of ANAS;
- Member of the Presidium of the Azerbaijan Supreme Attestation Commission under the President of Azerbaijan Republic;
- Foreign member of the Russian Academy of Natural Sciences on "Oil and gas" section;
- Member of SOCAR's central commission on oil and gas resources;
- Member of SOCAR's central commission for the development of oil, gas and gas-condensate fields;
- Deputy Chairman of the Scientific Council of the "OilGasScientificResearchProject" Institute, SOCAR;
- Chairman of the "Development, exploitation and drilling of wells" section of the Scientific Council of the "OilGasScientificResearchProject" Institute, SOCAR;
- Member of the Scientific Council of the "Oil and Gas" Institute of ANAS;
- Member of Society of Petroleum Engineers (SPE).

== Activities in scientific and technical publications ==
- Editor-in-chief of "Scientific Petroleum" journal;
- Deputy Editor-in-chief of "SOCAR Proceedings" journal;
- Deputy Editor-in-chief of "ANAS Transactions. Earth Sciences" journal;
- Member of the editorial board of "Azerbaijan Oil Industry" journal;
- Member of the editorial board of "Territoriya Nefteqaz" (Russia) scientific-practical journal;
- Member of the editorial board of The Journal "Bulletin of the Russian Academy of Natural Sciences" (Russia);
- Member of the editorial board of "Vesti gazovoy nauki" (Russia) scientific and technical publications;
- Reviewer in Journal of Petroleum Science & Engineering; Results in Engineering; Petroleum Science & Technology; International Journal of Oil, Gas and Coal Technology; Physics of Fluids; Industrial & Engineering Chemistry Research Journal; Energy & Fuels; Fuels; Colloids and Surfaces A: Physicochemical and Engineering Aspects Journal; Journal of the Chemical Society of Pakistan; RSC Advances; Journal of Molecular Liquids; Heliyon; ACS Omega; Colloid Journal.

== Death ==
Suleimanov died on 6 January 2026, at the age of 66.

== Awards and prizes ==
- 2024 – Record in Citation Diploma awarded by the Azerbaijan National Academy of Sciences for highest number of citations of his scientific works;
- 2020 – Azerbaijan State Oil and Industry University 100th anniversary (1920-2020) jubilee medal;
- 2019 – "Honorary oilman" breastplate of SOCAR;
- 2018 – "Academician Azad Mirzajanzade international silver medal" of the Russian Academy of Natural Sciences;
- 2018 – Winner of the fifth Republic competition in innovation;
- 2017 – Winner of the fourth Republic competition in innovation;
- 2017 – Medal for services to Ivano-Frankivsk National Technical University of Oil and Gas;
- 2016 – Winner of the third Republic competition in innovation;
- 2016 – "Taraggi" medal by order of the President of Azerbaijan Republic;
- 2013 – Winner of the first Republic competition in innovation;
- 2009 – Honorable diploma of SOCAR for special achievements in development of oil and gas industry of Azerbaijan Republic;
- 2004 – Honorable diploma of SOCAR for special achievements in development of oil and gas industry of Azerbaijan Republic;
- 1985 – "Inventor of the USSR" breastplate.

== Selected publications ==
=== Books ===
- B. A. Suleimanov, E. F. Veliyev. Methods for Enhanced Oil Recovery: Fundamentals and Practice. — UK: John Wiley & Sons Ltd., 2025. — 432p. ISBN 9783527848294
- B. A. Suleimanov, E. F. Veliyev, A. A. Aliyev. Oil and gas well cementing for engineers. — UK: John Wiley & Sons Ltd., 2023. — 272p. ISBN 9781394164851
- Baghir A. Suleimanov, Elchin F. Veliyev, Vladimir Vishnyakov. Nanocolloids for petroleum engineering: Fundamentals and practices. — UK: John Wiley & Sons Ltd., 2022. — 288p. Print ISBN 9781119889595, Online ISBN 9781119889762
- B. A. Suleimanov, E. F. Veliyev, А. D. Shavgenov. Well cementing: Fundamentals and practices. Series: Modern petroleum and gas technologies. - Моscow, Institute of Computer Science - 2022, 292p. ISBN 9785434409575 [in Russian]
- B. A. Suleimanov. Enhanced oil recovery: Fundamentals and practices. Series: Modern petroleum and gas technologies. - Моscow, Institute of Computer Science - 2022, 286p. ISBN 9785434409520 [in Russian]
- * Vladimir Vishnyakov, Baghir Suleimanov, Ahmad Salmanov, Eldar Zeynalov. Primer on enhanced oil recovery. 1st Edition. Gulf Professional Publishing, Elsevier Inc., 2019. — 223 p. Paperback ISBN 9780128176320, eBook ISBN 9780128176337
- B. A. Suleimanov. Specific features of heterogeneous system filtration. Series: Modern petroleum and gas technologies. - Моscow, Institute of Computer Science - 2006, 356p. ISBN 5939725929 [in Russian]

=== Articles ===
- Suleimanov B. A., Abbasov H. F. Gasified acid solution in pre-transition state for well stimulation // Journal of Dispersion Science and Technology. — Received 21 August 2024, Accepted 26 December 2024, Published online: 10 January 2025. — doi: 10.1080/01932691.2024.2448758;
- Suleimanov B. A., Abbasov E. M. Predıctıng of water breakthrough tıme ınto the well on pressure buıld-up curves // Applied and Computational Mathematics. - 2024. - Vol.23, N. 2. - P. 219-227. - doi: 10.30546/1683-6154.23.2.2024.219;
- Suleimanov B. A., Feyzullayev Kh. A. Simulation study of water shut-off treatment for heterogeneous layered oil reservoirs // Journal of Dispersion Science and Technology. - 2024. - P. 1-11. - doi: 10.1080/01932691.2024.2338361;
- Suleimanov B. A., Abbasov H. F. Wettability alteration of quartz sand using Z-type Langmuir–Blodgett hydrophobic films // Physics of Fluids. - 2024. - Vol. 36. - P. 034118. - doi: 10.1063/5.0196917;
- Baghir A. Suleimanov, Sabina J. Rzayeva, Aygun F. Akberova and Ulviyya T. Akhmedova. Self-foamed biosystem for deep reservoir conformance control // Petroleum Science and Technology, 2022, Vol. 40, No. 20, 2450–2467;
- B. A. Suleimanov, S. J. Rzayeva and U. T. Akhmedova. Self-gasified biosystems for enhanced oil recovery // International Journal of Modern Physics B, 2021, Vol. 35, No. 27, 2150274;
- B. A. Suleimanov, E. F. Veliyev and N. V. Naghiyeva. Colloidal dispersion gels for in-depth permeability modification // Modern Physics Letters B, 2021, Vol. 35, No. 1, 2150038;
- Baghir A. Suleimanov, Elchin F. Veliyev, Aliyev A. Azizagha. Colloidal dispersion nanogels for in-situ fluid diversion // Journal of Petroleum Science and Engineering, 2020, Vol. 193, No. 10, 107411;
- Rayyat Huseyn Ismayilov, Fuad Famil Valiyev, Nizami Vali Israfilov, Wen-Zhen Wang, Gene-Hsiang Lee, Shie-Ming Peng, Baghir A. Suleimanov. Long chain defective metal string complex with modulated oligo-α-pyridylamino ligand: Synthesis, crystal structure and properties // Journal of Molecular Structure, 2020, Vol. 1200, 126998;
- Baghir A. Suleimanov, Khasay A. Feyzullayev. Numerical simulation of water shut-off for heterogeneous composite oil reservoirs // SPE-198388-MS. SPE Annual Caspian Technical Conference held in Baku, Azerbaijan, 16 – 18 October 2019;
- Baghir A. Suleimanov, Khasay A. Feyzullayev, Elhan M. Abbasov. Numerical simulation of water shut-off performance for heterogeneous composite oil reservoirs // Applied and Computational Mathematics, 2019, Vol. 18, No. 3, 261–271;
- B. A. Suleimanov, N. I. Guseinova. Analyzing the state of oil field development based on the Fisher and Shannon information measures. Automation and Remote Control, 2019, Vol. 80, 882–896;
- Baghir A. Suleimanov, Hakim F. Abbasov, Fuad F. Valiyev, Rayyat H. Ismayilov, Shie-Ming Peng. Thermal-conductivity enhancement of microfluids with Ni_{3}(μ_{3}-ppza)_{4}Cl_{2} metal string complex particles // ASME. Journal of Heat Transfer, 2019, Vol. 141, 012404;
- Rayyat Huseyn Ismayilov, Fuad Famil Valiyev, Dilgam Babir Tagiyev, You Song, Nizami Vali Israfilov, Wen-Zhen Wang, Gene-Hsiang Lee, Shie-Ming Peng, Baghir A. Suleimanov. Linear pentanuclear nickel(II) and tetranuclear copper(II) complexes with pyrazine-modulated tripyridyldiamine ligand: Synthesis, structure and properties // Inorganica Chimica Acta, 2018, Vol. 483, 386-391;
- Baghir A. Suleimanov, Arif A. Suleymanov, Elkhan M. Abbasov, Erlan T. Baspayev. A mechanism for generating the gas slippage effect near the dewpoint pressure in a porous media gas condensate flow // Journal of Natural Gas Science and Engineering, 2018, Vol. 53, 237–248;
- Baghir A. Suleimanov, Yashar A. Latifov, Elchin F. Veliyev, Harry Frampton. Comparative analysis of the EOR mechanisms by using low salinity and low hardness alkaline water // Journal of Petroleum Science and Engineering, 2018, Vol. 162, 35–43;
- Baghir A. Suleimanov, Naida I. Guseynova, Sabina C. Rzayeva, Gulnar D. Tulesheva. Experience of acidizing injection wells for enhanced oil recovery at the Zhetybai field (Kazakhstan) // SPE-189028-MS. SPE Annual Caspian Technical Conference and Exhibition, At Baku, Azerbaijan, 1-3 November, 2017;
- Baghir A. Suleimanov, Naida I. Guseynova, Elchin F. Veliyev. Control of displacement front uniformity by fractal dimensions // SPE-187784-MS. SPE Russian Petroleum Technology Conference, Moscow, Russia, 16-18 October 2017;
- Baghir A. Suleimanov, Elchin F. Veliyev. Novel polymeric nanogel as diversion agent for enhanced oil recovery // Petroleum Science and Technology, 2017, Vol. 35, No. 4, 319–326;
- Baghir A. Suleimanov, Elkhan M. Abbasov, and Marziya R. Sisenbayeva. Mechanism of gas saturated oil viscosity anomaly near to phase transition point // Physics of Fluids, 2017, Vol. 29, 012106;
- Baghir A. Suleimanov, Rayyat H. Ismayilov, Hakim F. Abbasov, Wen-Zhen Wang, Shie-Ming Peng. Thermophysical properties of nano- and microfluids with [Ni_{5}(μ_{5}-pppmda)_{4}Cl_{2}] metal string complex particles. // Colloids and Surfaces A: Physicochemical and Engineering Aspects, 2017, Vol. 513, 41–50;
- Baghir A. Suleimanov, Hakim F. Abbasov. Chemical control of quartz suspensions aggregative stability // Journal of Dispersion Science and Technology, 2017, Vol. 38, No. 08, 1103–1109;
- Rayyat Huseyn Ismayilov, Wen-Zhen Wang, Gene-Hsiang Lee, Shie-Ming Peng, Baghir A. Suleimanov. Synthesis, crystal structure and properties of a pyrimidine modulated tripyridyldiamino ligand and its complexes // Polyhedron, 2017, Vol. 122, 203-209;
- B. A. Suleimanov, E. F. Veliyev. Nanogels for deep reservoir conformance control // SPE-182534-MS. SPE Annual Caspian Technical Conference & Exhibition, 1-3 November 2016, Astana, Kazakhstan;
- B. A. Suleimanov, F. S. Ismailov, O. A. Dyshin, E. F. Veliyev. Screening evaluation of EOR methods based on fuzzy logic and Bayesian inference mechanisms // SPE-182044-MS. SPE Russian Petroleum Technology Conference and Exhibition, 24-26 October 2016, Moscow, Russia;
- B. A. Suleimanov, O. A. Dyshin, E. F. Veliyev. Compressive strength of polymer nanogels used for enhanced oil recovery (EOR) // SPE-181960-MS. SPE Russian Petroleum Technology Conference and Exhibition, 24-26 October 2016, Moscow, Russia;
- B. A. Suleimanov, H. F. Abbasov. Effect of copper nanoparticle aggregation on the thermal conductivity of nanofluids // Russian Journal of Physical Chemistry A, 2016, Vol. 90, 420–428;
- B. A. Suleimanov, E. F. Veliyev & O. A. Dyshin. Effect of nanoparticles on the compressive strength of polymer gels used for enhanced oil recovery (EOR) // Petroleum Science and Technology, 2015, Vol. 33, No. 10, 1133–1140;
- Baghir Alekper Suleimanov, Fakhreddin Sattar Ismailov, Oleq Aleksandrovich Dyshin, Svetlana Sirlibayevna Keldibayeva. Statistical modeling of life cycle of oil reservoir development // Journal of the Japan Petroleum Institute, 2014, Vol. 57, No. 1, 47–57;
- Suleimanov B. A., Dyshin O. A. Application of discrete wavelet transform to the solution of boundary value problems for quasi-linear parabolic equations // Applied Mathematics and Computation. - 2013. - Vol. 219, No. 12. - P. 7036–7047. - doi: 10.1016/j.amc.2012.11.033;
- B. A. Suleimanov. Mechanism of slip effect in gassed liquid flow // Colloid Journal, 2011, Vol. 73, No. 6, 846–855;
- B. A. Suleimanov, F. S. Ismailov, E. F. Veliyev. Nanofluid for enhanced oil recovery // Journal of Petroleum Science and Engineering, 2011, Vol. 78, 431–437;
- E. M. Abbasov, O. A. Dyshin, B. A. Suleimanov. Wavelet method for solving the unsteady porous-medium flow problem with discontinuous coefficients // Computational Mathematics and Mathematical Physics, 2008, Vol. 48, 2194–2210;
- B. A. Suleimanov, E. M. Abbasov, A. O. Efendieva. Stationary filtration in a fractal inhomogeneous porous medium // Journal of Engineering Physics and Thermophysics, 2005, Vol. 78, No. 4, 832–834;
- B. A. Suleimanov. On the effect of interaction between dispersed phase particles on the rheology of fractally heterogeneous disperse systems // Colloid Journal, 2004, Vol. 66, No. 2, 249–252;
- B. A. Suleimanov, Kh. F. Azizov, E. M. Abbasov. Slippage effect during gassed oil displacement // Energy Sources, 1996, Vol. 18, No. 7, 773–779.

=== Presentations ===
USA, Great Britain, Turkey, Russia, Belarus, Ukraine, Kazakhstan, Uzbekistan, etc. participated as a speaker in international forums, conferences and symposia held in different countries.

=== Academic editorship ===
- Fakhreddin S. Ismailov, Ahmad М. Salmanov, Bakir I. Maharramov. Oil-gas fields and prospective structures of Azerbaijan. Lesser Caucasus-Talysh oil and gas province. Book 3. Referencebook / Scientific editor: Baghir A. Suleimanov. - Baku: «MSV» publishing house, 2024. - 668р.; ISBN 978-9952-37-978-5.
- Fakhreddin S. Ismailov, Ahmad М. Salmanov, Bakir I. Maharramov, Hafiz I. Shakarov. Oil-gas fields and prospective structures of Azerbaijan. Area of Caspian Sea. Book 2. Referencebook / Scientific editor: Baghir A. Suleimanov. - Baku: «MSV» publishing house, 2024. - 648р.; ISBN 978-9952-37-978-5.
- Fakhreddin S. Ismailov, Ahmad М. Salmanov, Bakir I. Maharramov. Oil-gas fields and prospective structures of Azerbaijan. Qusar-Devechi, Khizi & Absheron OGR. Book 1. Referencebook / Scientific editor: Baghir A. Suleimanov. - Baku: «Mars Print» publishing house, 2023. - 776р.; ISBN 978-9952-37-978-5.
- Ahmad М. Salmanov, Bakir I. Maharramov, Elmir Sh. Qaragezov, Nizami S. Kerimov. Geology of oil-gas fields and development stages of Azerbaijan area of Caspian sea. Referencebook / Scientific editor: Baghir A. Suleimanov. - Baku: «MSV» publishing house, 2023. - 508р. ISBN 978-9952-39-083-4
- Ahmad М. Salmanov, Bakir I. Maharramov, Elmir Sh. Qaragezov, Nizami S. Kerimov. Geology of oil-gas fields and development stages in onshore territory of Azerbaijan. Referencebook / Scientific editor: Baghir A. Suleimanov. - Baku: «MSV» publishing house, 2023. - 624р.; ISBN 978-9952-39-147-3.
- Sh. Z. Ismailov, A. А. Suleymanov, I. N. Aliyev, F. F. Ahmed. Features of developing and exploiting hydrocarbon fields by surface and subsea field complexes: textbook / Scientific editor: Baghir A. Suleimanov. Ministry of Science and Education Republic of Azerbaijan, Azerbaijan State Oil and Industrial University. — Baku: Elm, 2023, 217 p.

He is the scientific editor of the New Bibliography of Academician Azad Mirzajanzade and 4 volumes of Selected Works, published by ANAS "Elm" publishing house in connection with the implementation of the Decree of the President of Azerbaijan Republic on the 90th anniversary of Academician Azad Mirzajanzade.

- Azad Khalil oglu Mirzajanzade: biobibliographic index / Scientific editor. B. A. Suleimanov. - Baku: Elm, 2018. - 216 p. ISBN 978-9952-514-50-6
- A.Kh. Mirzajanzade. Selected works. Volume I / Scientific ed. B. A. Suleimanov. - Baku: Elm, 2018. - 658 c. ISBN 978-9952-514-54-4
- A.Kh. Mirzajanzade. Selected works. Volume II / Scientific ed. B. A. Suleimanov. - Baku: Elm, 2018. - 574 c. ISBN 978-9952-514-89-6
