= Arguj Kalantarli =

Secretary-General of the International Civil Defence Organization

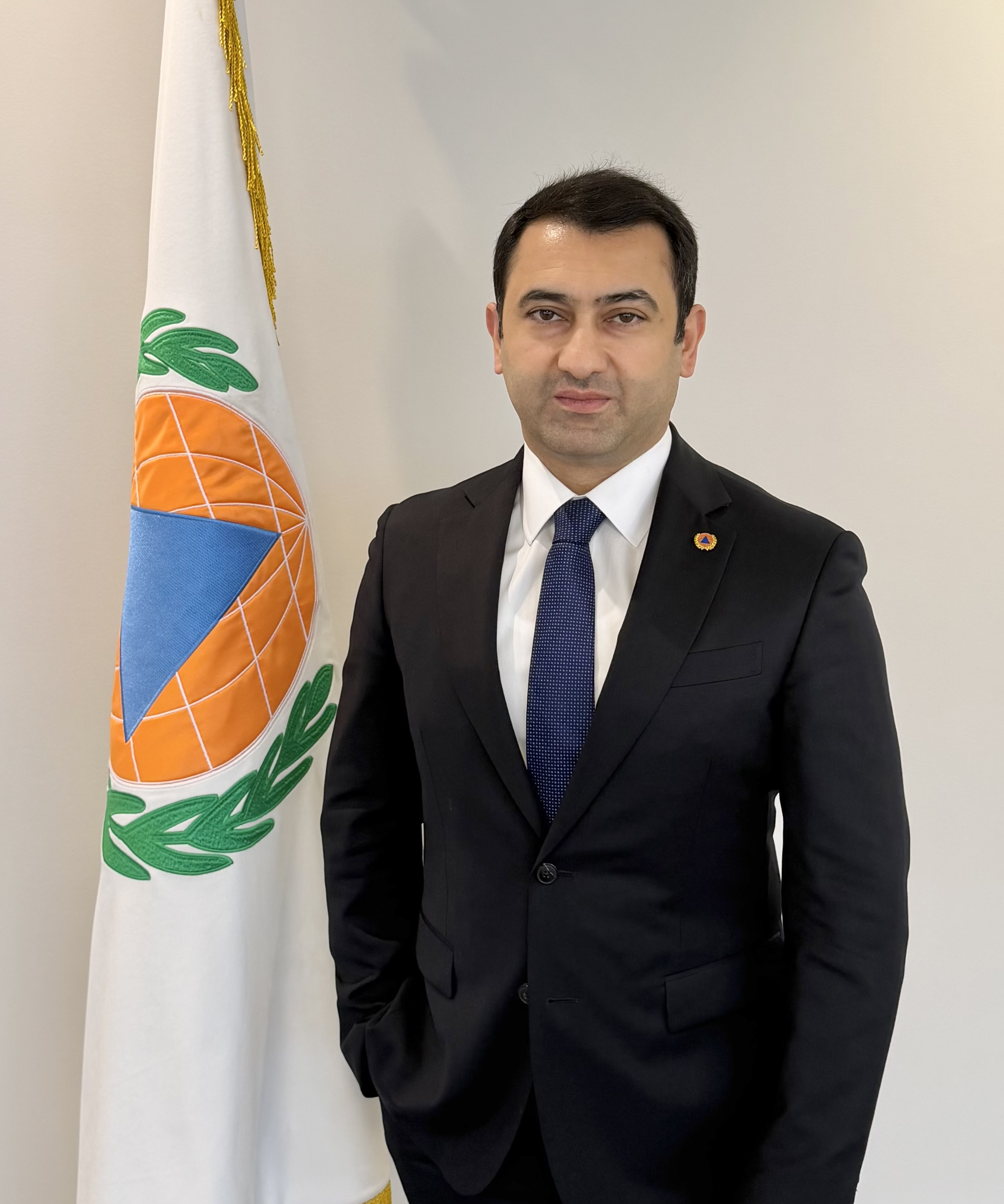
- Born: December 7, 1981 (age 44); Nakhchivan, Azerbaijan
- Education: Azerbaijan University of Languages, Baku State University
- Occupation: Secretary-General of the International Civil Defence Organization

Arguj Kalantarli (born 7 December 1981, Nakhchivan, Azerbaijan) is an Azerbaijani civil servant currently serving as the Secretary-General of the International Civil Defence Organization (ICDO). Before his election, he held various positions in Azerbaijan’s Ministry of Emergency Situations, focusing on international cooperation and disaster management.

== Early life and education ==
Kalantarli studied English philology at the Azerbaijan University of Languages from 1999 to 2003. Between 2009 and 2013, he completed a second degree in international law at Baku State University.

== Career ==
Kalantarli began his career in 2005 at the State Customs Committee of Azerbaijan, serving as a senior inspector in the Department of Foreign Relations.

In 2006, he joined the Ministry of Emergency Situations of Azerbaijan as Deputy Head of the International Activity Department, and in 2007 became Head of the International Relations Department, a post he held until 2025. During this period, he coordinated projects in civil protection, disaster preparedness and international cooperation.

== Secretary-General of the International Civil Defence Organization ==
On 10 July 2025, Kalantarli was elected Secretary-General of the International Civil Defence Organization during the third extraordinary session of its General Assembly held in Baku, Azerbaijan. He became the first Azerbaijani to hold this position. He was elected in the first round with the support of 23 member states, ahead of candidates from Serbia, Tunisia and Burkina Faso.

As Secretary-General, he has emphasized strengthening international cooperation in civil defence, disaster risk reduction and emergency response, as well as promoting capacity-building among ICDO member states.

== Public statements ==
Kalantarli has spoken about the need for coordinated international responses to humanitarian crises and disasters, and has called for enhanced cooperation among states to mitigate the effects of natural and man-made hazards.

== Awards ==
He has received the following state awards of Azerbaijan:

- Medal "For Military Service"
- Order "For Service to the Fatherland", 3rd Degree
- Order "For Service to the Fatherland", 2nd Degree

== Personal life ==
Kalantarli is fluent in Azerbaijani, English, Russian and Turkish, and has working proficiency in French. He is married and has two children.
