= Lala Alizadeh =

Azerbaijani scientist (1950–2026)

Lala Alizadeh (Azerbaijani: Lalə Əlizadə; 5 February 1950 – 21 March 2026) was an Azerbaijani scientist.

== Life and career ==
Alizadeh was born in Baku, Azerbaijan SSR on 5 February 1950.

She was the author of roughly 100 scientific, literary, and methodological articles published in Azerbaijan and abroad. Notable publications include "The Secret Word of Fuzuli" (1989), "Teaching Fuzuli" (1995), "The Relic of the Great Fuzuli" (1996), "Mohammad Fuzuli" (2009), "The Cover of the Beauty of Words" (2016), and "Allegory in Azerbaijani Literature" (2020).

Alizadeh died on 21 March 2026, at the age of 76.
