= Hajibaba Azimov =

Azerbaijani politician (1938–2026)

- Hacıbaba Əzimov
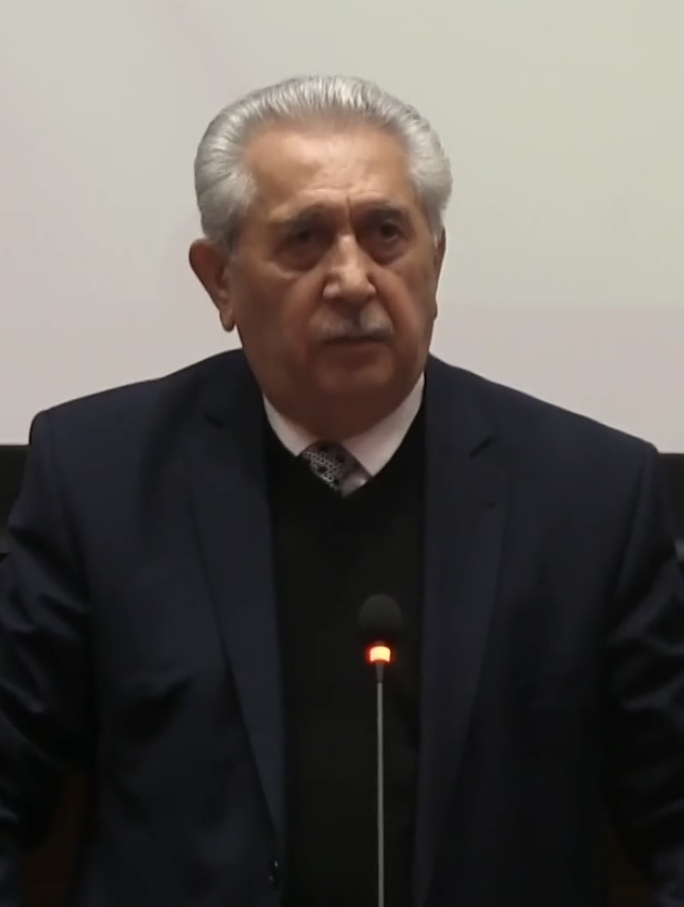
- Azimon in 2016

Member of the Supreme Soviet of Azerbaijan
- In office 5 February 1991 – 24 November 1995

Personal details
- Born: 1 August 1938 Lankaran, Azerbaijani SSR, Soviet Union
- Died: 16 May 2026 (aged 87)
- Party: CPSU (until 1991)
- Education: Baku State University
- Occupation: Academic

Hajibaba Sadiq oglu Azimov (Azerbaijani: Hacıbaba Sadıq oğlu Əzimov; 1 August 1938 – 16 May 2026) was an Azerbaijani politician. A member of the Communist Party of the Soviet Union, he served in the Supreme Soviet of Azerbaijan from 1991 to 1995.

Azimov died on 16 May 2026, at the age of 87.

== Early life and education ==
He was born on August 1, 1938, in the city of Lankaran, Azerbaijani SSR. In 1955, he graduated from Secondary School No. 3 in Lankaran. In 1960, he graduated from the Faculty of History of the Azerbaijan State University.
