= Chamber of Accounts of the Republic of Azerbaijan =

Azerbaijani audit institution

The Chamber of Accounts of the Republic of Azerbaijan (Azerbaycan Respublikasının Hesablama Palatası) is a supreme audit institution, the highest financial control authority of the Republic of Azerbaijan.

It is subordinate to the National Assembly of the Republic of Azerbaijan. The Chairman of the Accounts Chamber is Vugar Gulmamedov. Its members are appointed and dismissed by Milli Majlis (National Assembly of the Republic of Azerbaijan) according to law.

== History ==
The Chamber was established in accordance with Article 92 of the Constitution of the Republic of Azerbaijan (adopted in 1995). The Law of the Republic of Azerbaijan “On the Chamber of Accounts”, dated July 2, 1999, defined the main tasks of the institution. On December 7, 2001, it officially started to operate.

== International relations ==
The Chamber collaborates with several worldwide organizations and has been accepted to the membership INTOSAI (International Organization of Supreme Audit Institutions) (2002), ECOSAI (Economic Cooperation Organization of Supreme Audit Institutions) (2002), ASOSAI (Asian Organization of Supreme Audit Institutions), EUROSAI (European Organization of Supreme Audit Institutions) and the Council of SAIs, Head of CIS Member Countries.

The institution established bilateral cooperation with the following SAIs:

- State Audit Office of Georgia (2003)
- Supreme Audit Court of Islamic Republic of Iran (2005)
- Office of the Auditor General of Pakistan (2005)
- Turkish Court of Accounts (2005)
- State Audit Bureau of Kuwait (2006)
- Accounts Committee for Control over Execution of the Republican Budget (2006)
- Accounting Chamber of Ukraine (2006)
- Court of Accounts of Moldova (2014).

== Duties ==
The Chamber has the following duties;

- Reviewing draft budget and implementing the state budget, including extra-budgetary funds and budgetary expenditures.
- Providing annual reports on draft budget, including the state budget and the funds that are not directly part of state budget.
- External state financial control bodies implement financial control over:
  - State property management
  - State procurement
  - State investment
  - Utilization of funds allocated to state programs and projects
  - Appointment and effective use of grants and financial assistance
  - Protection of the environment, utilization of the funds allocated to eliminate the consequences of natural disasters
  - State orders
  - Formation, accumulation and usage of extra-budgetary funds
- Reporting semi-annual and annual information and analysis of the execution of the state budget the entities defined by the corresponding executive authority:
  - Act in accordance in its activities with the state, commercial, tax, banking secrecy and privacy regime.
  - Carrying out legitimate actions in order to fight against corruption;
  - Collaborating with state bodies in order to fight against violations of law;
  - Submitting annual report to the Milli Majlis (National Assembly of the Republic of Azerbaijan) about its activities;

== Structure ==
The members consist of Chairman, Deputy Chairman and five auditors. Their terms are seven years. The members are appointed by the votes of at least 63 members of the Milli Majlis on the basis of the introduction of the Chairman of the Milli Majlis.

Members can attend in the meetings of the Milli Mejlis on invitation from that .
