= Rafael Gvaladze =

Azerbaijani judge (1948–2026)

- Rafael Qvaladze

Judge of the Constitutional Court of Azerbaijan
- In office 14 July 1998 – 10 April 2025

Personal details
- Born: Rafael Sergeyevich Gvaladze; 1 January 1948 Lagodekhi, Georgian SSR, USSR
- Died: 15 January 2026 (aged 78) Baku, Azerbaijan
- Education: Baku State University
- Occupation: Judge

Rafael Sergeyevich Gvaladze (Azerbaijani: Rafael Sergeyeviç Qvaladze; 1 January 1948 – 15 January 2026) was an Azerbaijani judge. He served on the Constitutional Court from 1998 to 2025.

Gvaladze died in Baku on 15 January 2026, at the age of 78.
