= State Flag Day (Azerbaijan) =

National holiday in Azerbaijan

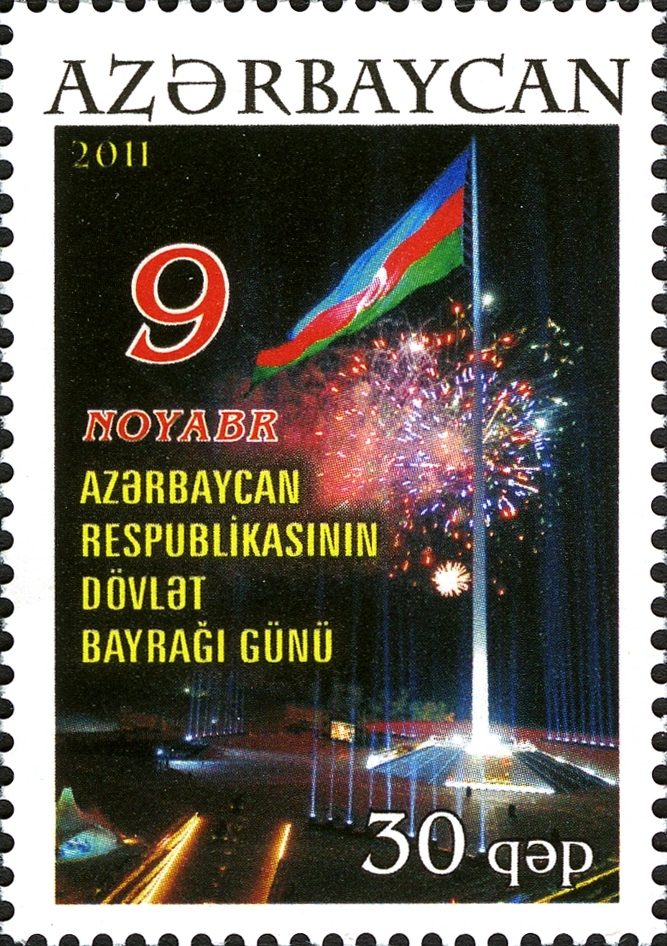
- A commemorative holiday stamp.
- Observed by: Azerbaijan
- Type: State
- Celebrations: Fireworks, Concerts, Ceremonies
- Date: 9 November
- Next time: 9 November 2025
- Frequency: annual

The State Flag Day of Azerbaijan (Azerbaijani: Azərbaycan Respublikasının Dövlət Bayrağı Günü) is a national holiday in Azerbaijan that is celebrated annually on 9 November. State Flag Day was established in 2009 by order of President Ilham Aliyev to commemorate the anniversary of adoption of "The Tricolour Flag" (Azerbaijani: Üçrəngli bayraq) as the flag of the Azerbaijan Democratic Republic in 1918. It has been celebrated as a non-working public holiday ever since.

== Commemorations ==
=== Commemorations by year ===
- In 2010, a ceremony was held on National Flag Square in Baku for the holiday.
- 2018 marked the 100th anniversary of the Azeri flag. In Binəqədi raion, the Youth and Sports Department jointly organized an event entitled "The Eternal Pin of Independence". The Youth Union of the Ganja City Branch of the New Azerbaijan Party organized a march "One flag for everyone" on the occasion.
- In 2019, Turkish Foreign Minister Mevlut Cavusoglu commemorated the day with a joint video with Azerbaijani Foreign Minister Elmar Mammadyarov in which he said that "The freedom, future and prosperity [of Turkey and Azerbaijan] are connected to one another". At the same time, 9 November was declared to be Azerbaijani State Flag Day in the US state of Oklahoma.
- On the holiday in 2020, the Ukrainian Honorary Consulate was opened in the city of Shamakhi and was also illuminated the colors of the Azerbaijani flag.

=== 2020 war celebrations ===
The 2020 celebrations of the holiday were held in connection with the Azerbaijani victory in the Battle of Shusha, in which the Azerbaijani Army recaptured of the city of Shusha during the 2020 Nagorno-Karabakh war. Azerbaijani ambassador to Pakistan Ali Alizadaon tweeted a picture of the flags of Azerbaijan, Turkey and Pakistan, saying that National Flag Day was "incomplete" without the flags of those two countries, as a sign of respect for the involvement of those two countries in the war. Since 2020, the day before State Flag Day has been commemorated as Victory Day.

== See also ==
- Republic Day (Azerbaijan)
- Public holidays in Azerbaijan
