= International Solidarity Day of Azerbaijanis =

Public holiday in Azerbaijan

International Solidarity Day of Azerbaijanis Dünya Azərbaycanlılarının Həmrəyliyi Günü
- Observed by: Azerbaijani people
- Date: 31 December
- Next time: 31 December 2026
- Frequency: annual

International Solidarity Day of Azerbaijanis (Azerbaijani: Dünya Azərbaycanlılarının Həmrəyliyi Günü) is an annual public holiday in Azerbaijan celebrating the worldwide solidarity and unity of Azerbaijanis. The day was inspired by the dismantling of border fences between Soviet Azerbaijan and Iran in December 1989 and the collapse of the Berlin Wall in the same year.

== History ==
In 1989 the local residents took down the Soviet–Iranian border in then-Nakhichevan ASSR to reunite with Iranian Azerbaijanis. On the same day, the first World Congress of Azerbaijanis took place in Istanbul.

The day was first promoted on 16 December 1991 by then-Chairman of the Nakhchivan Autonomous Republic Supreme Assembly Heydar Aliyev. The various governments that have been in power since Azerbaijan's independence from the Soviet Union have all marked that day. Aliyev raised the issue before the Supreme Soviet of Azerbaijan SSR to declare that date a holiday at state level. The holiday eventually gained a state status in 1992, with Abulfaz Elchibey's presidential decree.

The day was entered into the Labor Code of Azerbaijan as a non-working day, coinciding with New Year's Eve, and is celebrated by Azerbaijani diaspora across the world.

== See also ==
- Congress of World Azerbaijanis
