= Victory Day (Azerbaijan) =

Public holiday in Azerbaijan

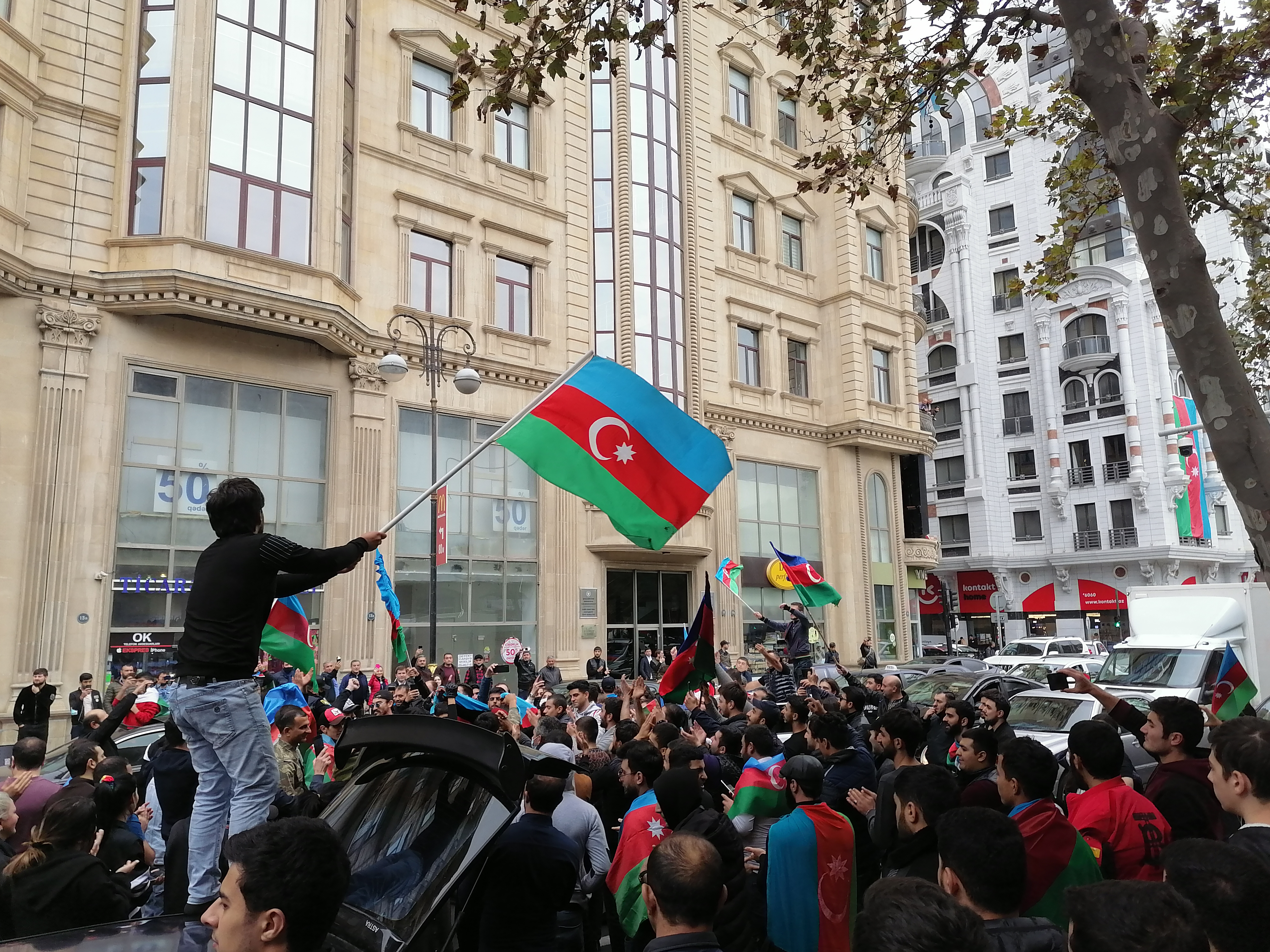
- Baku residents celebrating victory over Armenia on 8 November 2020.
- Official name: Azerbaijani: Zəfər Günü
- Observed by: Azerbaijan
- Type: Patriotic
- Significance: in commemoration of Azerbaijan being the victor in the Second Nagorno-Karabakh War
- Date: 8 November
- Next time: 8 November 2027
- Frequency: Annual
- Related to: 2020 Nagorno-Karabakh war

The Victory Day (Azerbaijani: Zəfər Günü) is a public holiday in Azerbaijan that is celebrated on 8 November, in commemoration of Azerbaijan's victory in the Second Nagorno-Karabakh War. Established by the decree of the President of Azerbaijan on 2 December 2020, the holiday is celebrated on the day of the recapture of Shusha. It is a non-working holiday.

== Background ==
On 27 September 2020, clashes broke out in the disputed Nagorno-Karabakh region, which is de facto controlled by the self-proclaimed and unrecognized Republic of Artsakh, but de jure part of Azerbaijan. Azerbaijani forces first advanced into Fuzuli and Jabrayil districts, taking their respective administrative centres. From there, they proceeded towards Hadrut. Azerbaijani troops began to advance more intensively after the fall of Hadrut around 15 October, and Armenians began to retreat, with Azerbaijanis then taking control of Zangilan and Qubadli. Launching an offensive for Lachin, they also penetrated Shusha District through its forests and mountain passes.

Following the capture of Shusha, the second-largest settlement in Nagorno-Karabakh, a ceasefire agreement was signed between the President of Azerbaijan, Ilham Aliyev, the Prime Minister of Armenia, Nikol Pashinyan, and the President of Russia, Vladimir Putin, ending all hostilities in the area from 00:00 on 10 November 2020 Moscow Time. Under the agreement, the warring sides will keep control of their currently held areas within Nagorno-Karabakh, while Armenia returned the surrounding territories it occupied in 1994 to Azerbaijan. Azerbaijan will also gain land access to its Nakhchivan exclave bordering Turkey and Iran. Approximately 2,000 Russian soldiers were deployed as peacekeeping forces along the Lachin corridor between Armenia and Nagorno-Karabakh for a mandate of at least five years.

== Institution of the holiday ==
On 2 December 2020, the President of Azerbaijan, Ilham Aliyev, signed a decree on the establishment of Victory Day as a public holiday in Azerbaijan. The day of the signing of the ceasefire agreement ending the war, and its entry into force by Azerbaijan Time, 10 November, was to be celebrated in Azerbaijan as the Victory Day. The next day, this order was cancelled. The holiday's celebration date was changed to 8 November, the day the Azerbaijani forces seized control Shusha, as the previous date overlapped with Mustafa Kemal Atatürk's Memorial Day in Turkey. On 8 December, It was announced that a new station of the Baku Metro's Purple Line (B3) will be named "November 8" at the suggestion of Aliyev.

== See also ==
- Memorial Day (Azerbaijan)
- Public holidays in Azerbaijan
- Shushi Liberation Day
