= Novruz in Azerbaijan =

Novruz
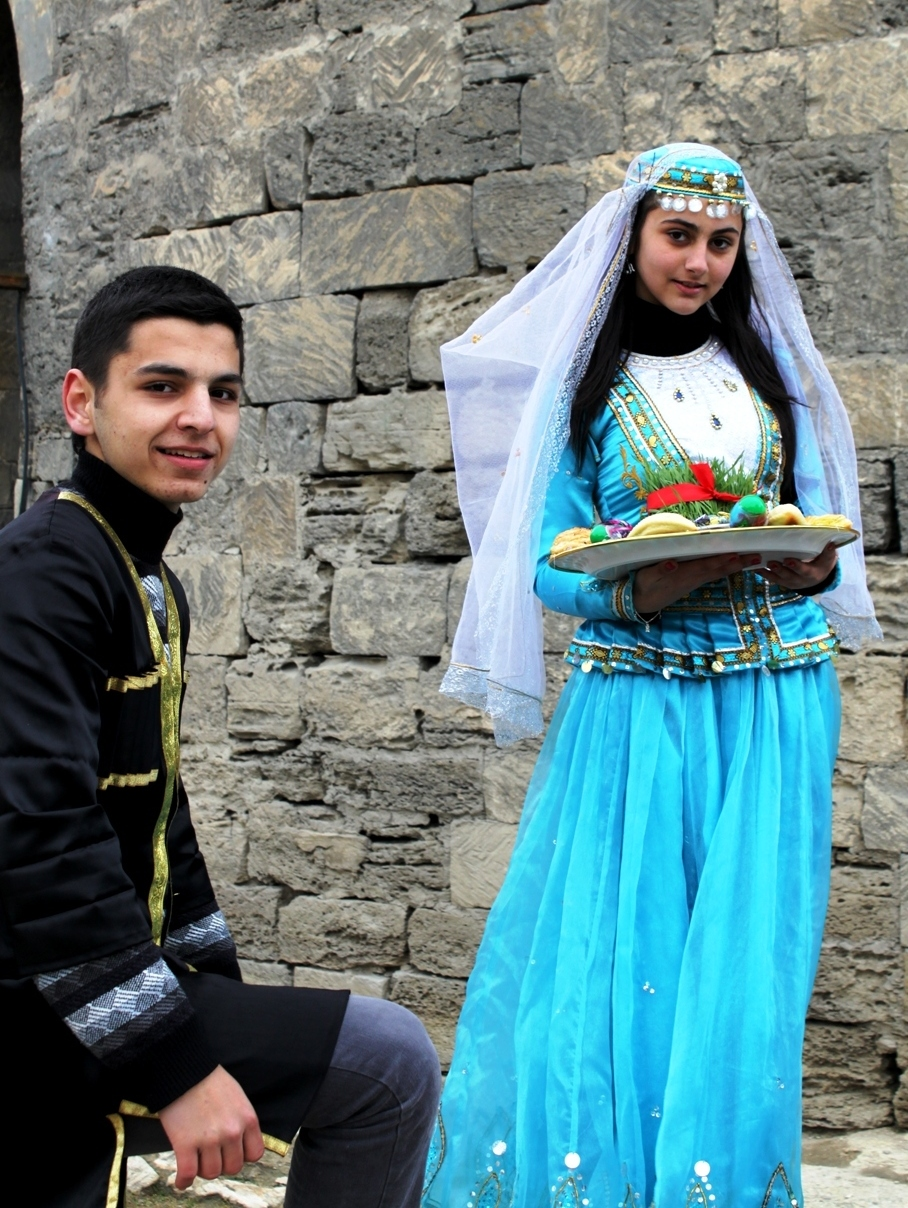
- Azerbaijani youth celebrating Novruz.
- Observed by: Azerbaijanis
- Type: Cultural
- Significance: Vernal equinox; day of new year on the Solar Hijri calendar
- Date: March 21
- Frequency: Annual
- Related to: Nowruz

Nawrouz, Novruz, Nowrouz, Nowrouz, Nawrouz, Nauryz, Nooruz, Nowruz, Navruz, Nevruz, Nowruz, Navruz
- UNESCO Intangible Cultural Heritage
- Country: Afghanistan, Azerbaijan, India, Iran, Iraq, Kazakhstan, Kyrgyzstan, Pakistan, Tajikistan, Turkey, Turkmenistan, and Uzbekistan
- Reference: 01161
- Region: Europe and North America

Inscription history
- Inscription: 2016 (4th session)
- List: Representative

Novruz (Azerbaijani: Novruz Bayramı) is a traditional holiday in Azerbaijan, which celebrates the astronomical spring equinox and the coming of Spring. When Azerbaijan was part of the Soviet Union, the celebration of Novruz was generally unofficial and at times even prohibited. Currently in Azerbaijan, Novruz is treated as an official public holiday. In accordance with Article 105 of the Labour Code of Azerbaijan passed in 2006, workers receive five days off for Novruz.

After neighboring Iran, Azerbaijan hosts the longest observance and number of public days related to Novruz, with a total (including weekend) of five days.

== Novruz customs and celebration ==
Usually, preparation for Novruz begins a month prior to the festival. Each Tuesday people celebrate the day of one of the four elements – water, fire, wind and soil. People do house cleaning, plant trees, make new dresses, paint eggs, and make national pastries such as shekerbura, pakhlava, shorgoghal, in additional to a great variety of national cuisine. Wheat is fried with kishmish (raisins) and nuts (govurga). As a tribute to pre-Islamic Zoroastrian beliefs, every Tuesday during the four weeks before the holiday, children jump over small bonfires and candles are lit. On the holiday eve, the graves of relatives are visited and tended.

During Novruz, various traditional games and events are held, such as “Kos-kosa” (symbolizes the coming of spring), “Khidir Ilyas” (the symbol of fertility and blossom) and fortune-telling are held at musical gatherings. Folk singers sing songs while wrestlers test their strength.

Novruz is a family holiday and the evening before the holiday, the whole family gathers around the holiday table laid with various dishes to make the New Year rich. The holiday goes on for several days and ends with festive public dancing, contests of national sports and other entertainment such as from folk bands.

The decoration of the festive table is known as khoncha. A large silver or copper tray with samani – green shoots from wheat seeds – is placed in the centre and candles and dyed eggs. Custom dictates that the table should be set with at least seven dishes.

The last four Tuesdays of winter (usually starts from the last Tuesday of February) before Novruz are celebrated by Azerbaijanis and called as “Charshanba”. According to Azerbaijani traditions, “Charshanbas” indicates the end of winter and start of spring. According to the folk belief, the first Charshanba represents water and celebrates its purifying nature.

The second Charshanba relates to the element of fire. It is believed that the action of jumping over bonfires and lighting candles renews a person and purges them of illness, allowing them to start the spring with positivity.

The third Charshanba in Azerbaijani tradition represents wind, which brings the beginning of spring on the air. In some western regions of Azerbaijan, the people call this day as Black Wednesday. Azerbaijanis are supposed to visit and restore the graves of their relatives

The fourth and last Charshanba represents earth, known as “Torpag Chershenbesi” or “Ilakhir Charshanba”. It is believed that on this day nature revives again. Azerbaijanis consider this Charshanba as the most important among the four and hold special traditions related to this day. For example, there should be seven varieties of food on the table and all of their names must start with the letter 's' in Azerbaijani, such as sumakh (a kind of spice), sud (milk), sirke (vinegar), samani (prepared from wheat), and so on. Folk tales say that in the evening of the fourth Charshanba, it is possible for young girls to see their future husbands by approaching to a mirror with a candle in their hands. Children knock at the doors of neighbouring houses and leave their hats or bags, hoping for candies and desserts that are specially prepared for the holiday, such as shakarbura and pakhlava.

== Ceremonies ==
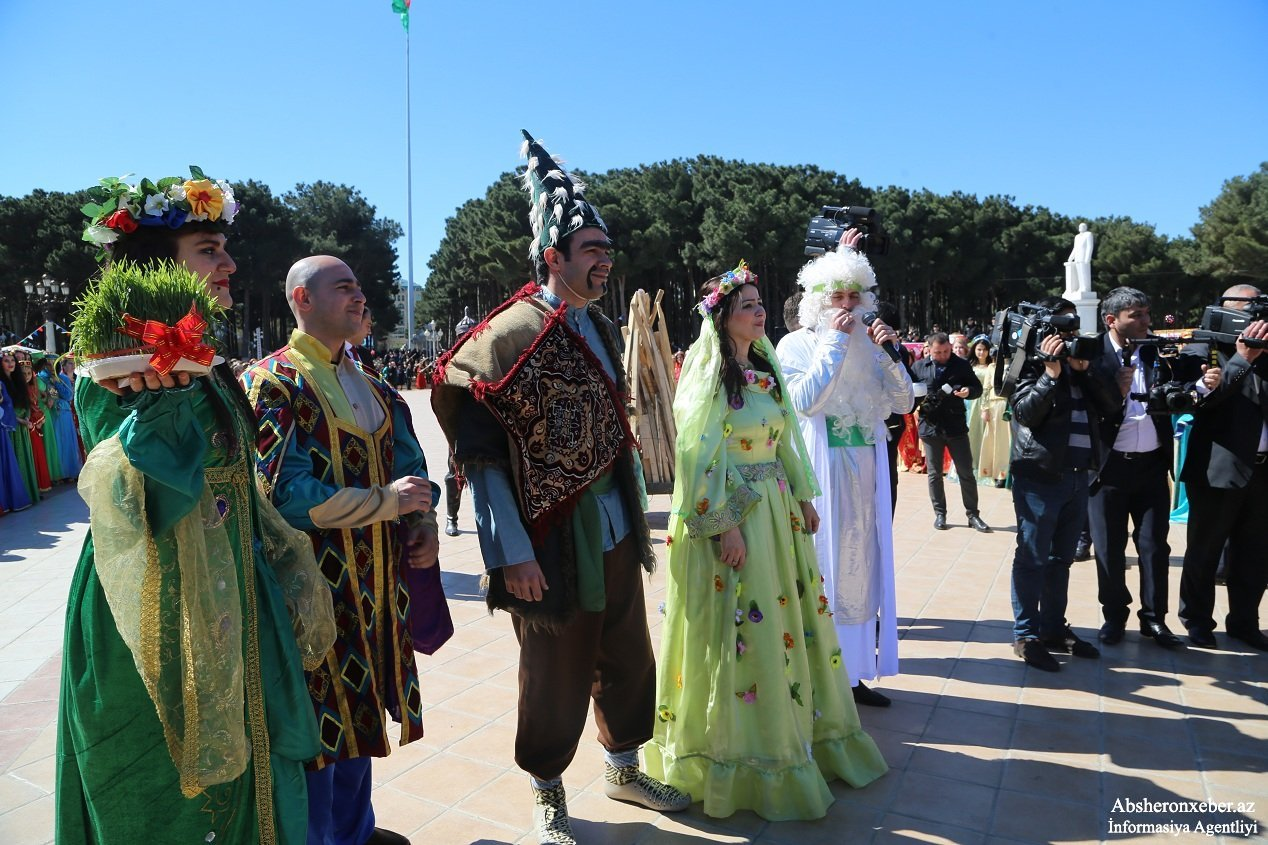
Kosa (third from the left) and Kechal (second from the left) at Nowruz celebrations in Azerbaijan

During Novruz holiday, various songs related to Novruz are sung and different activities such as tightrope walking and wrestling take place in the public squares. Another ceremony is that of growing samani in a plate, which symbolises the fertility of spring. One especially notable portion of the festival is the traditional comedic performance of the story of Kosa and Kecel – permanent characters in the holiday narrative. Kosa and Kechal (Azerbaijani: Kosa və Keçəl; كوسا و كئچل) are two comical characters from Azerbaijan who appear in the streets to celebrate Nowruz. Kosa is typically depicted as a "plump skinny man with a fake beard" who can't grow facial hair and symbolizes the winter, while Kechal is a "bald myschievious fat man" who symbolizes the summer, with his name literally translating to bald-head from Azerbaijani. When Nowruz arrives, they play Kos-kosa (a traditional Azerbaijani Nowruz game) with the kids, paint eggs, sing songs and often fight with each other, symbolizing the arrival of spring. Kosa and Kechal have become one of the, if not the most, famous characters in Azerbaijani Nowruz traditions, gaining large amounts of attention and taking part in mainstream talkshows and movies. Their fighting represents the "conflict between winter and spring", ending with Kechal winning, symbolizing the "victory of spring".

== Beliefs related to Novruz ==
- Entire families gather at home and sit around a table (symbolizing that they have spent a year together),
- On the last night of the year, family members sprinkle water on each other (it means they will get rid of all difficulties of the old year).
- It is mandatory on this day to serve seven dishes that begin with the letter "s" in Azerbaijani language.
- During holidays, the doors are not locked, and it symbolizes the hospitality of the host.
- On the first day of Novruz, the houses must be lit during the whole night. Putting the light off is related to bad luck.
- Jumping seven times over fire (it is believed that the fire will burn the hardness of the last year).
- There must be a mirror and burning candles on the table (mirror is the symbol of happiness and the light of candle keeps the evil spirits away from the house).
- According to belief in Azerbaijan, the weather of the first day of Novruz indicates spring, the second day after it is summer, the third day is autumn and the fourth is winter.

== Gallery ==
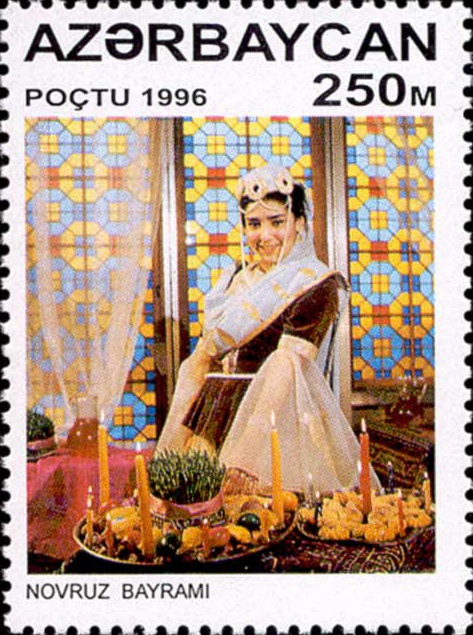
A 1996 Azerbaijani postage stamp issued for Novruz

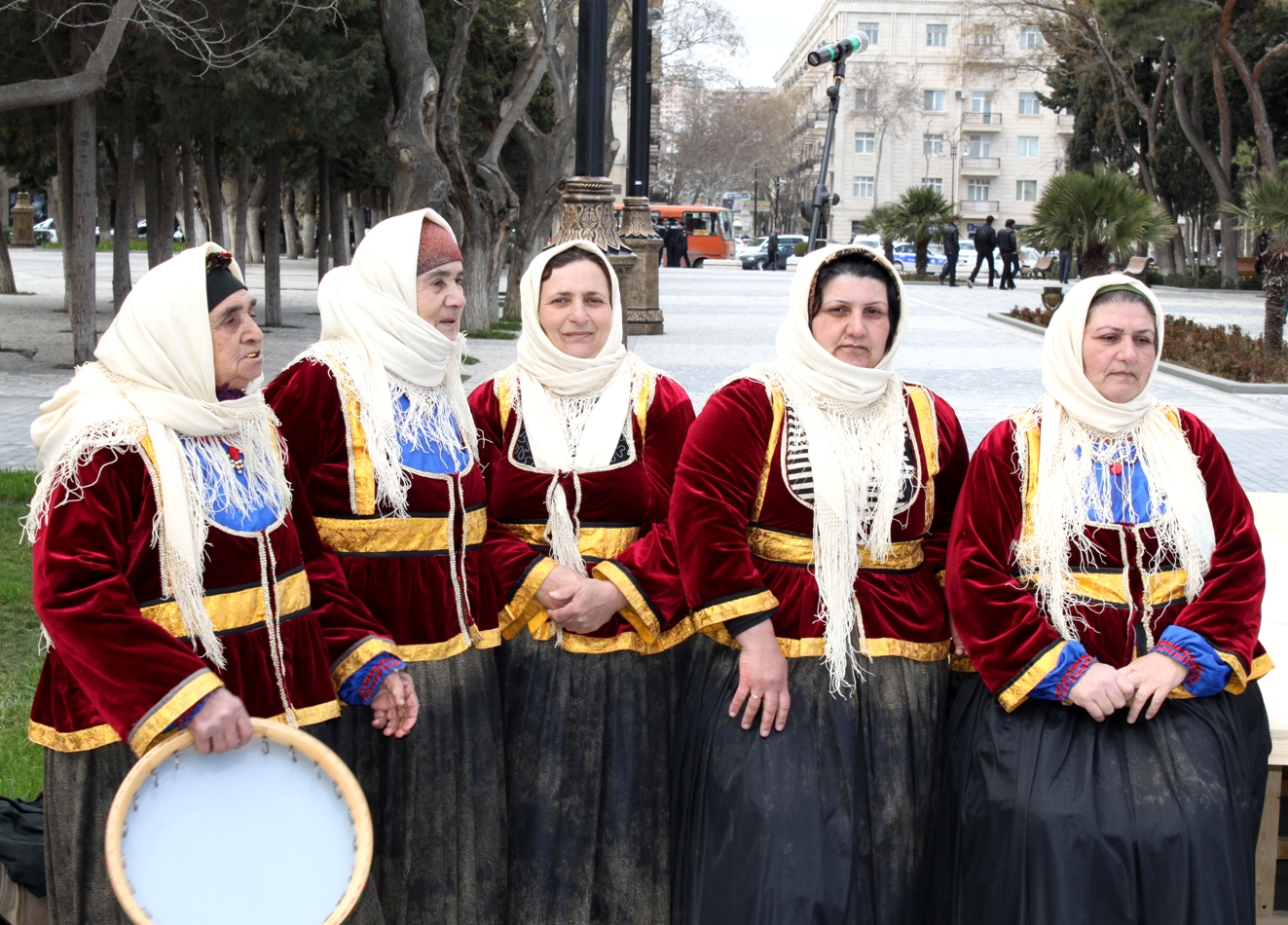
Traditional Azerbaijani Folk Performers

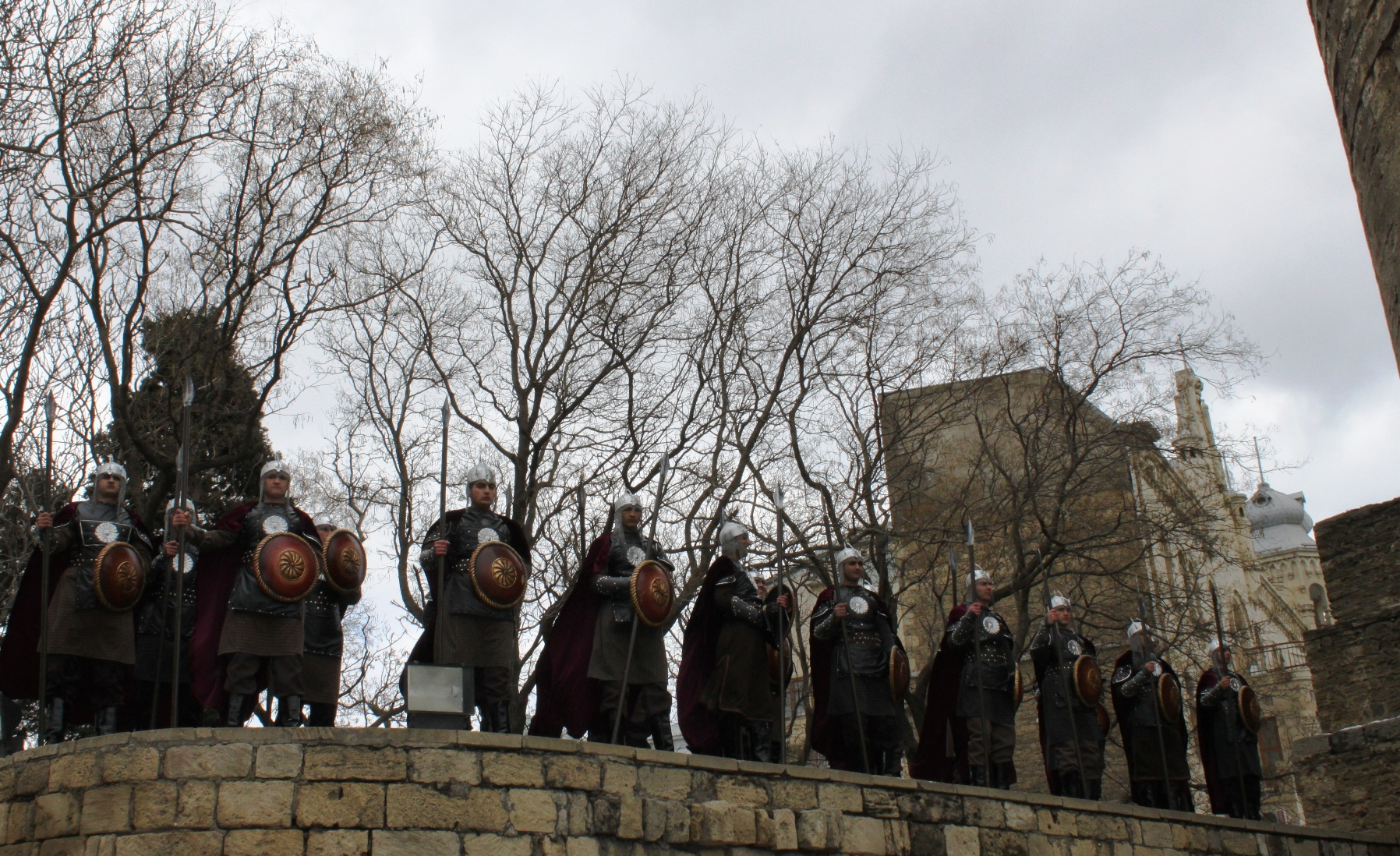
Medieval warriors near the Maiden Tower

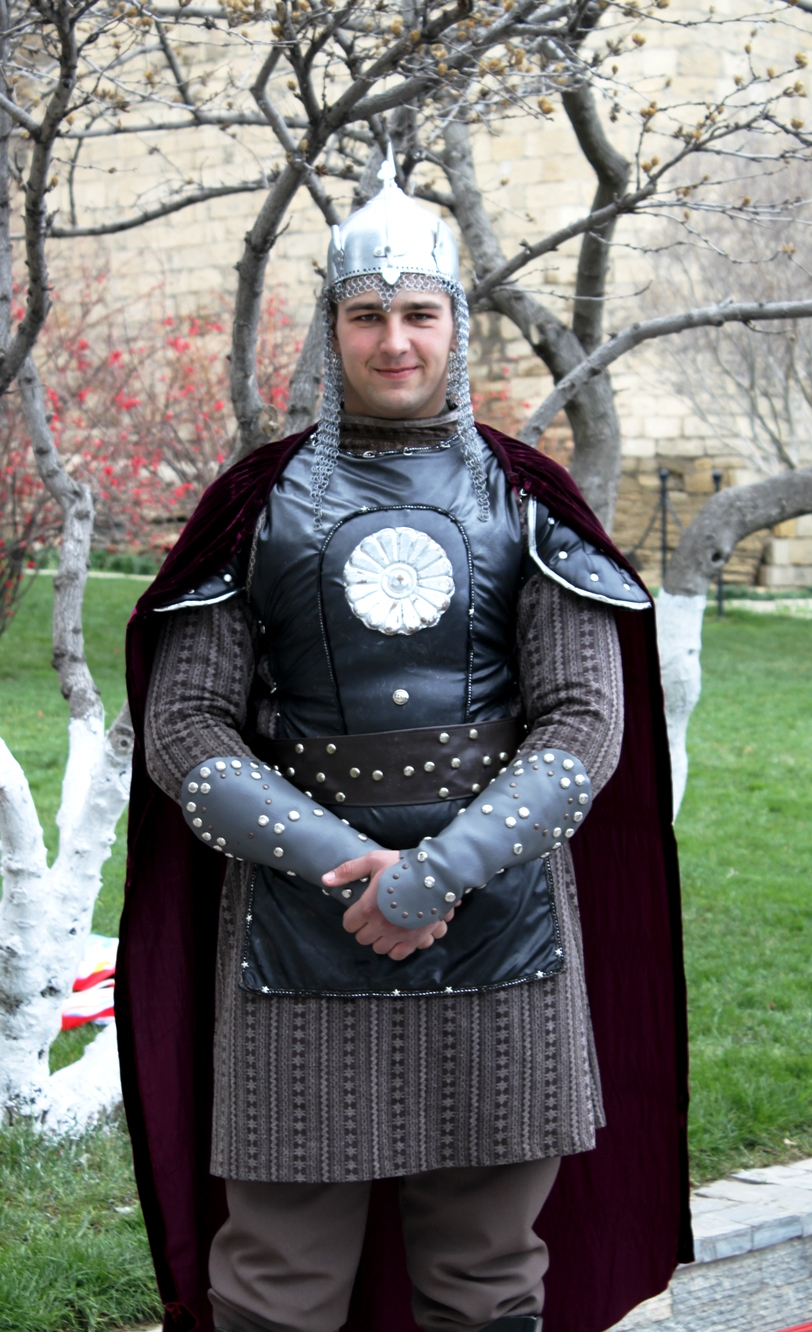
Medieval warrior

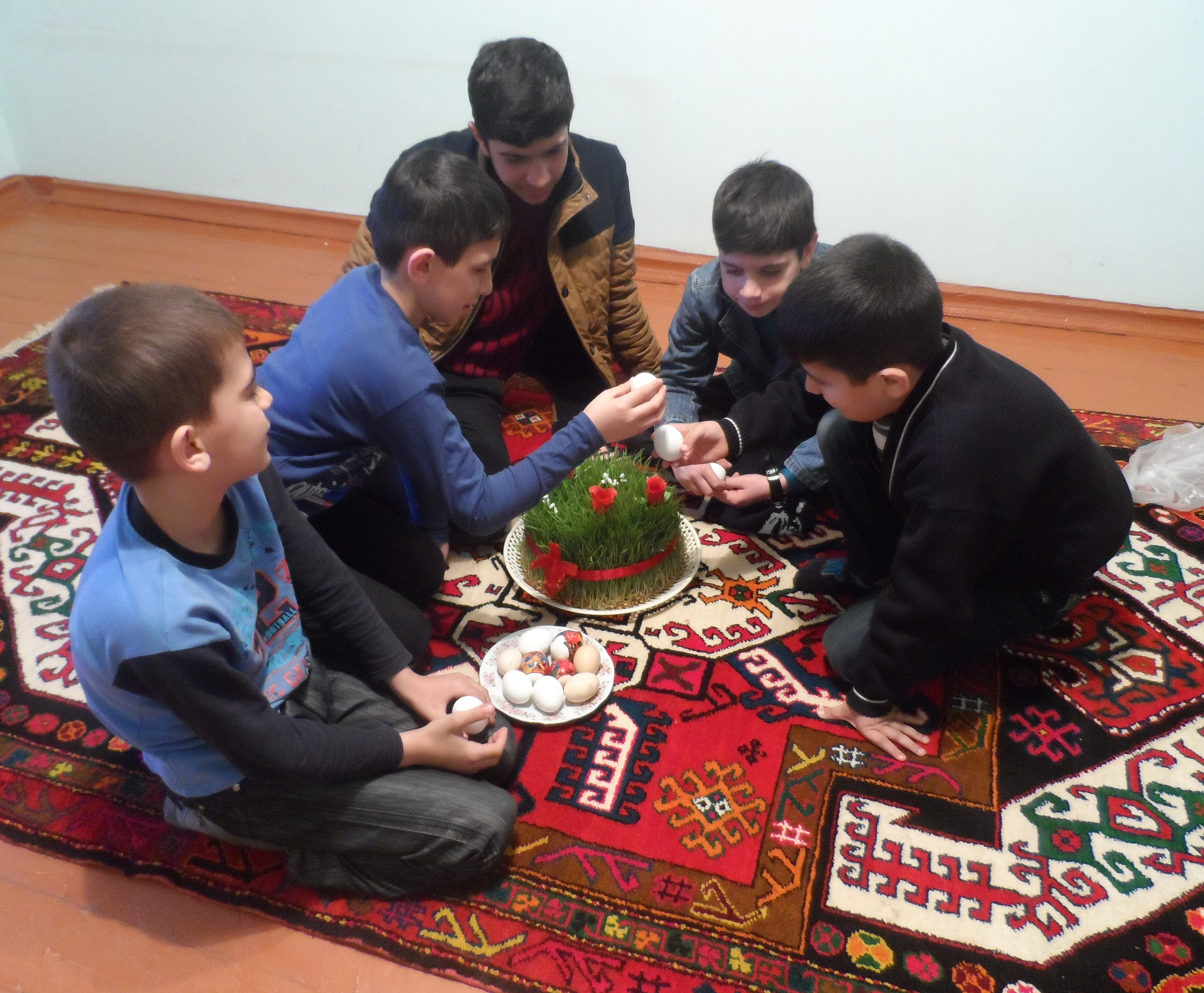

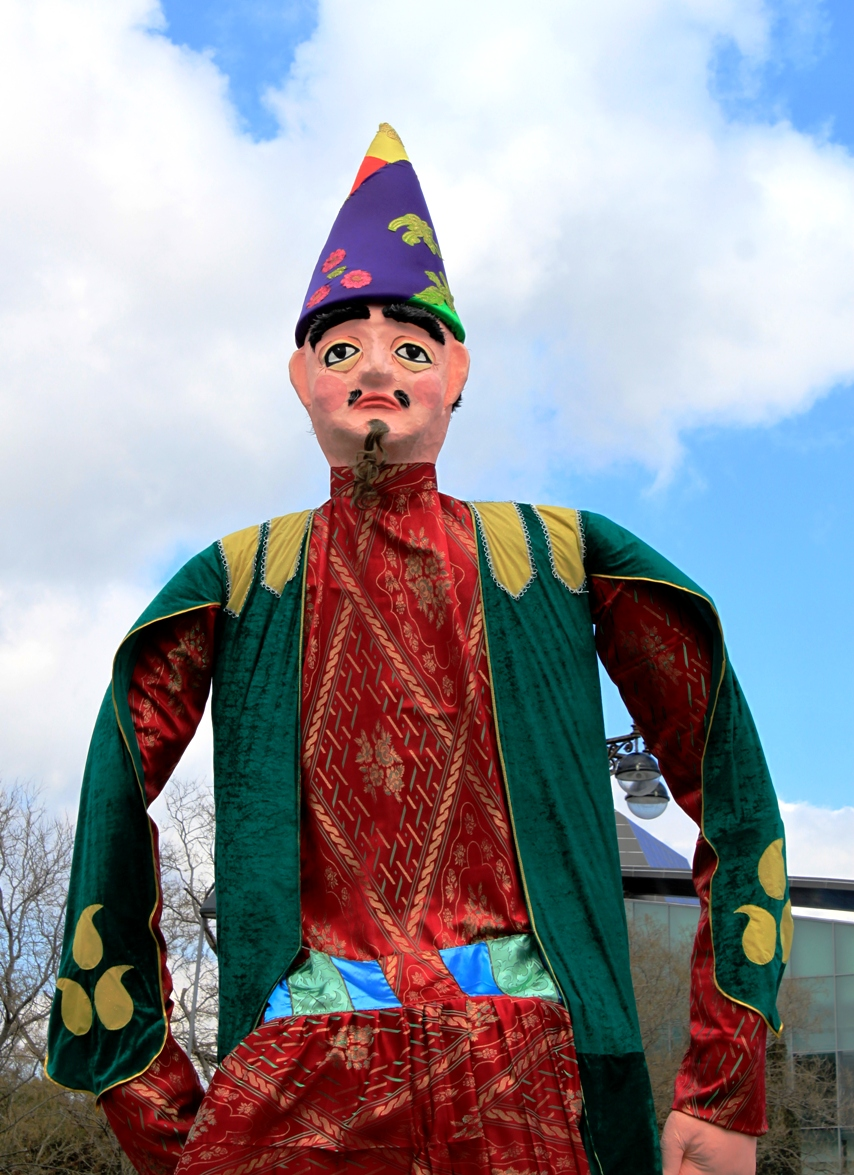
Kosa that means a man with little or no beard, is a carnival character known to the medieval and modern folklore of Novruz

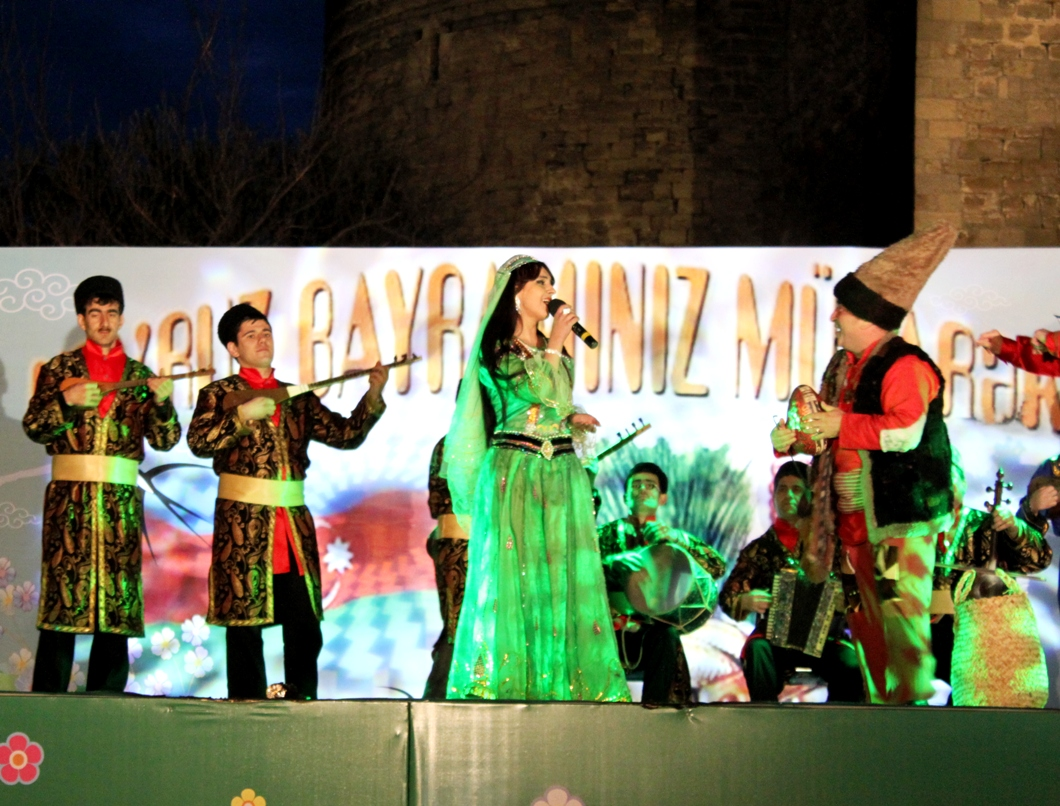
Nowruz Concert in Baku

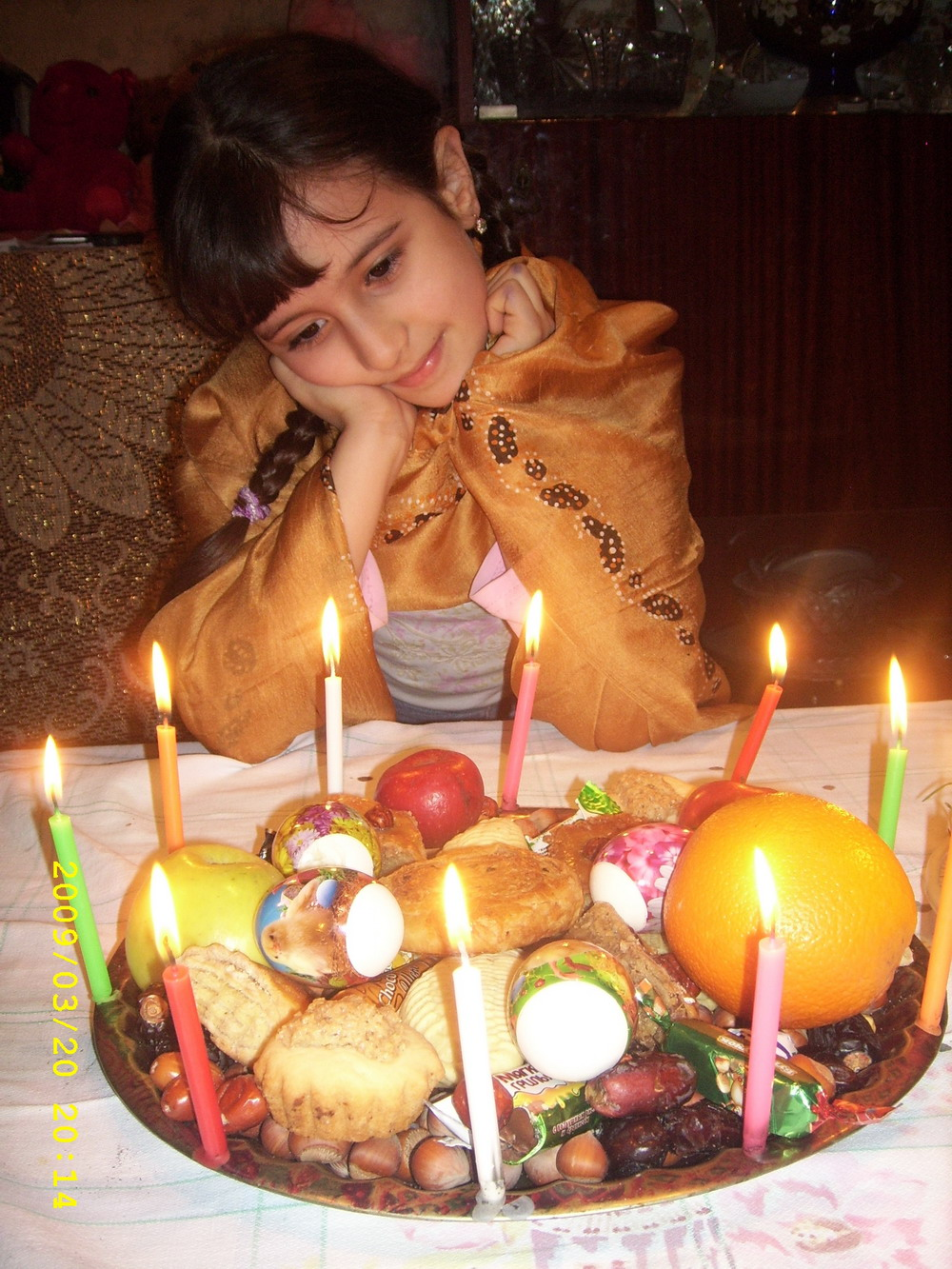
Azerbaijani girl with Khoncha

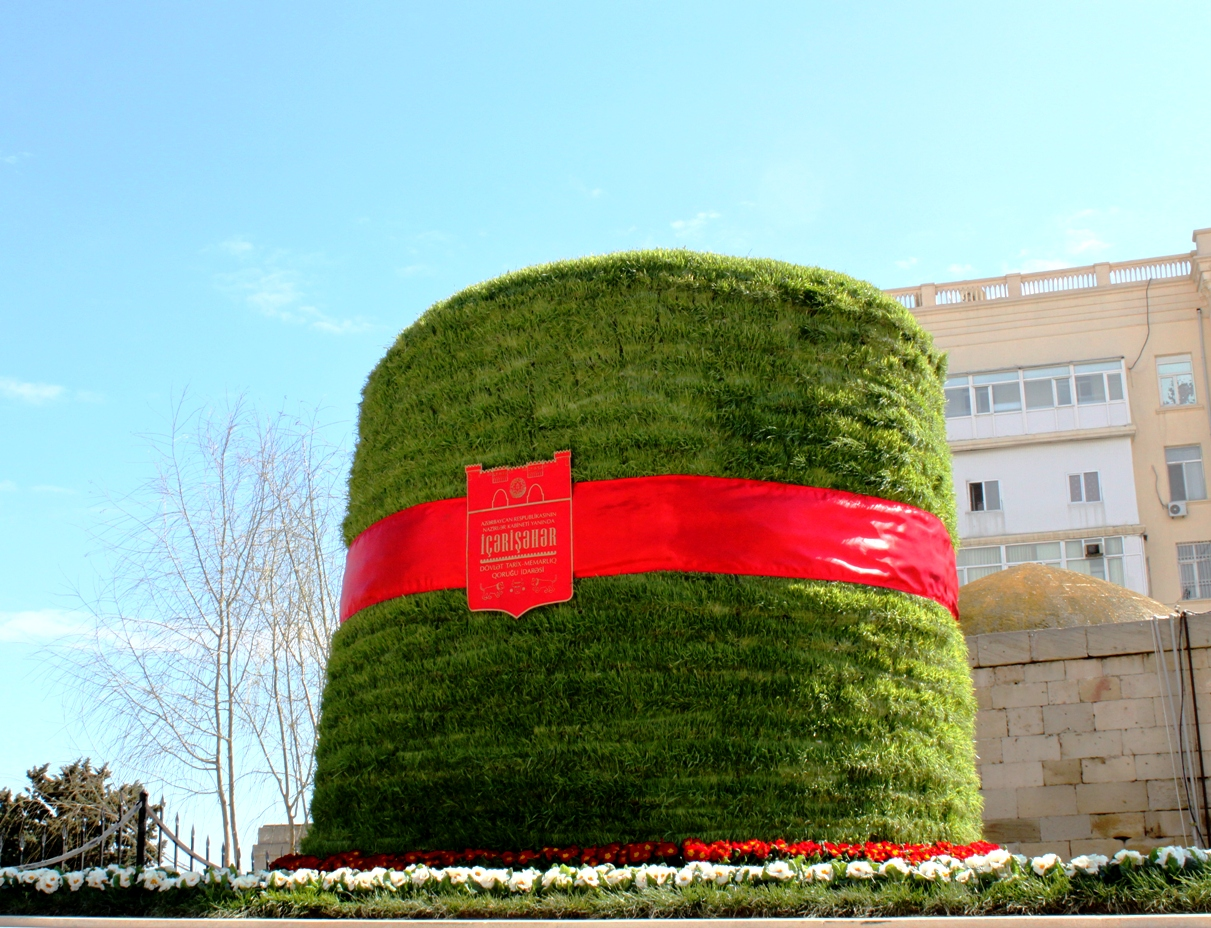
Giant Samani

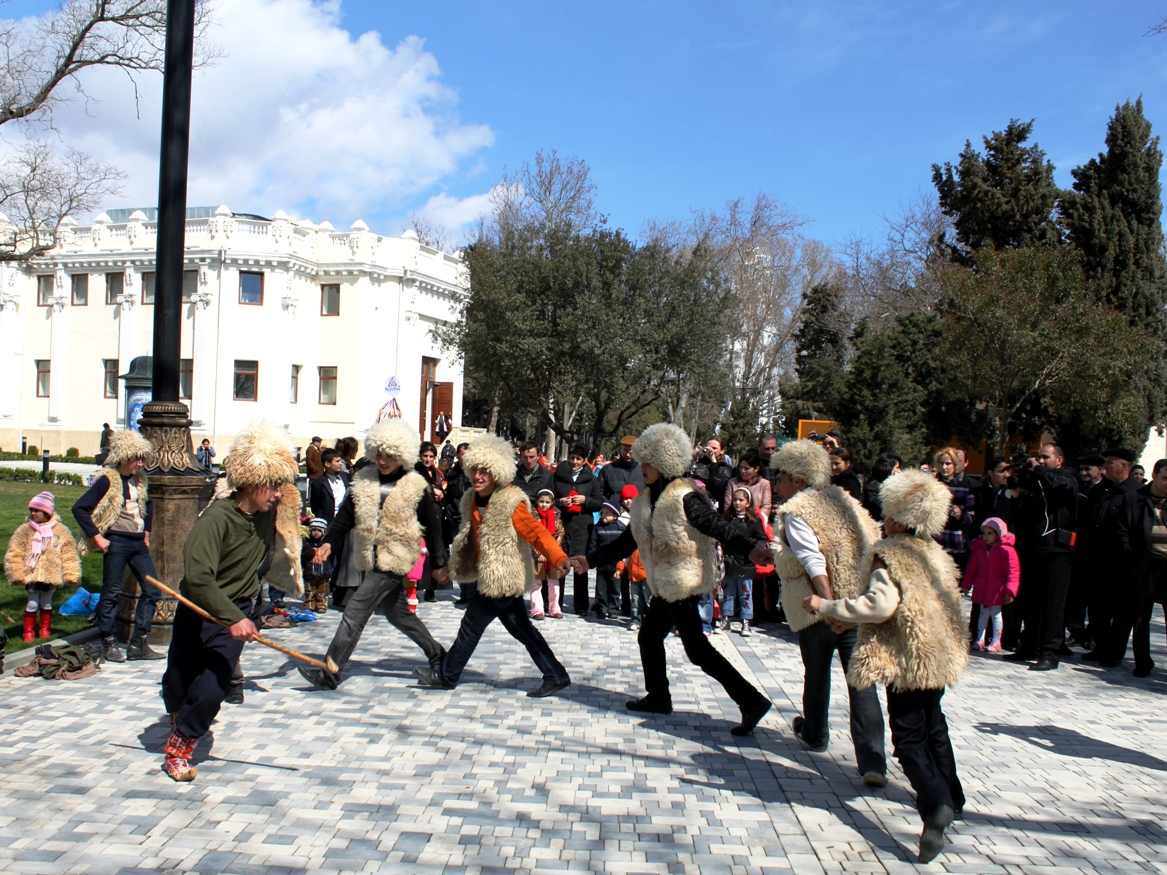
Azerbaijani kids dancing Shepherd dance
