= 2022 in Azerbaijan =

- Decades: 2000s; 2010s; 2020s
- See also: Other events of 2022; Timeline of Azerbaijani history

This is a list of individuals and events related to Azerbaijan in 2022.

== Incumbents ==
Photo	Post	Name
	President of Azerbaijan	Ilham Aliyev
	Vice President of Azerbaijan	Mehriban Aliyeva
	Prime Minister of Azerbaijan	Ali Asadov
	Speaker of the National Assembly of Azerbaijan	Sahiba Gafarova

== Events ==
=== Ongoing ===
- COVID-19 pandemic in Azerbaijan

=== January ===
- 5 January — 2022 was declared the "Year of Shusha"
- 7 January — "Khanim Fatimeyi-Zahra" mosque in Yeni Günəşli settlement of Suraxanı district was put into use after reconstruction
- 10 January — Ilham Aliyev accepted he credentials of the newly appointed ambassadors of South Korea and Algeria to Azerbaijan:
  - Ambassador of South Korea – Lee In-Yong
  - Ambassador of Algeria – Abdelouahab Osman
- 14 January — Ilham Aliyev visited Ukraine and met President of Ukraine Volodymyr Zelenskyy in Kyiv
- 18 January — Ilham Aliyev inaugurated the statue of Haji Zeynalabdin Taghiyev in Baku

=== February ===
- 11 February – A new 20 manat banknote was put into circulation
- 21 February
  - Ilham Aliyev visited Russia
  - 2 members of Azerbaijan Parliament (Tahir Mirkishili and Soltan Mammadov) visited Armenia and met Prime Minister of Armenia Nikol Pashinyan in Yerevan
- 22 February
  - Ilham Aliyev met President of Russia Vladimir Putin in Moscow
  - The Moscow Declaration was signed

=== March ===
- 10 March — Ilham Aliyev visited Turkey and met President of Turkey Recep Tayyip Erdoğan in Ankara
- 24 March — Farukh operation: Units of Azerbaijan Army entered Farukh village of Khojaly district
- 26 March — Farukh operation: Farukh village, Farukh mountain, Daşbaşı hill and Sagsagan mountain range of Khojaly district were liberated from occupation. Aghdam and 9 villages of district were removed from the visual control of the Armenians. Visual control of Khankendi-Aghdara highway was achieved
- 31 March — Shusha was declared "Culture Capital of the Turkic World" for 2023

=== April ===
- 3 April – An explosion occurred in the "Location Baku" night club in Baku. 3 people died and 35 were injured
- 14 April — Prime Minister of Albania Edi Rama visited Azerbaijan and met Ilham Aliyev in Baku
- 19 April
  - Ilham Aliyev accepted he credentials of the newly appointed ambassadors of UAE, Cuba and Egypt to Azerbaijan:
    - Ambassador of UAE – Mohammed Al Blushi
    - Ambassador of Cuba – Carlos Enrique Valdes de la Concepcion
    - Ambassador of Egypt – Hisham Mohammed Nagy Abdel Hamid
  - President of Kyrgyzstan Sadyr Japarov visited Azerbaijan
- 20 April — Ilham Aliyev met President of Kyrgyzstan Sadyr Japarov in Baku
- 22 April — 23 — V Congress of World Azerbaijanis (Shusha)

=== May ===
- 5 May — 8 — I International Culinary Festival (Shusha)
- 6 May — 7 — "President's Cup-2022" International Tournament (Sugovushan, Tartar) (Mingachevir)
- 10 May — 14 — Eurovision Song Contest 2022 (Turin, Italy)
  - Song: Fade To Black
  - Singer: Nadir Rustamli
  - Place: 16
  - Score: 106
- 12 May — 14 — V Kharibulbul Music Festival (Shusha)
- 14 May — Ilham Aliyev visited Turkey and met President of Turkey Recep Tayyip Erdoğan in Rize
- 17 May — President of Lithuania Gitanas Nausėda visited Azerbaijan
- 18 May — Ilham Aliyev met President of Lithuania Gitanas Nausėda in Baku
- 20 May — 27 — I Baku International Piano Festival
- 26 May — 29 — Teknofest Festival 2022

=== June ===
- 2 June — 4 — VII International Congress of Social Sciences (Baku) (Shusha)
- 10 June — 12 — 2022 Azerbaijan Grand Prix (Baku)
  - 1 - Max Verstappen (150 points)
  - 2 - Sergio Pérez (129 points)
  - 3 - Charles Leclerc (116 points)
- 16 June
  - President of Georgia Salome Zourabichvili visited Azerbaijan and met Ilham Aliyev in Baku
  - President of Albania Ilir Meta visited Azerbaijan and met Ilham Aliyev in Baku
  - Director-General of the World Health Organization Tedros Adhanom Ghebreyesus visited Azerbaijan and met Ilham Aliyev in Baku
  - President of Venezuela Nicolás Maduro visited Azerbaijan
- 16 June — 18 — IX Global Baku Forum
- 17 June — President of Venezuela Nicolás Maduro met Ilham Aliyev in video format
- 21 June — Ilham Aliyev visited Uzbekistan and met President of Uzbekistan Shavkat Mirziyoyev in Tashkent
- 29 June
  - Ilham Aliyev visited Turkmenistan and met President of Turkmenistan Serdar Berdimuhamedow in Ashgabat
  - VI Caspian Summit was held in Ashgabat, Turkmenistan
  - Ilham Aliyev met President of Russia Vladimir Putin in Ashgabat, Turkmenistan
  - Ilham Aliyev met President of Iran Ebrahim Raisi in Ashgabat, Turkmenistan

=== July ===
- 12 July — Ilham Aliyev accepted the credentials of the newly appointed ambassador of Czech Republic to Azerbaijan
  - Ambassador of the Czech Republic – Milan Sedláček
- 14 July — 15 — 2022 Vagif Poetry Days (Shusha)
- 18 July — President of European Commission Ursula von der Leyen visited Azerbaijan and met Ilham Aliyev in Baku
- 19 July — 25 — 1st stage of resettlement of residents to Agali village, which was rebuilt on the basis of the concept of "smart village" in Zangilan district
- 20 July – 9 September – Summer Fest 2022

== Deaths ==
=== January ===
- 1 January
  - Ramiz Abutalibov, historian and diplomat (b. 1937)
  - Madina Giyasbeyli, associate professor of BSU, pedagogue, doctor of philosophy in pedagogy (b. 1948)
- 2 January — Maharram Mammadyarov, scientist (b. 1924)
- 4 January — Kamal Babayev, photographer, journalist (b. 1927)
- 8 January
  - Novruz Gartal, actor (b. 1947)
  - Inna Gurbanova, senior researcher of ANAS, doctor of biological sciences (b. 1937)
- 10 January
  - Abdurrahman Vazirov, politician, 13th leader of Azerbaijan SSR (1988–1990) (b. 1930)
  - Tofig Babanli, boxer, coach (b. 1937)
- 13 January — Farrukh Zeynalov, deputy, Minister of Mineral Resources (b. 1942)
- 14 January
  - Ramiz Aliyev, filmmaker (b. 1938)
  - Garib Orujov, Hero of Socialist Labor (b. 1935)
- 15 January — Alikram Taghiyev, doctor of philosophy, professor (b. 1945)
- 19 January — Aydin Abdullayev, producer, film production organizer (b. 1951)
- 21 January — Nizami Agayev, soil scientist, agrochemical scientist, doctor of agricultural sciences, professor (b. 1936)
- 23 January — Minira Garayeva, pedagogue, linguist, professor (b. 1937)
- 26 January
  - Sadreddin Sadreddinov, associate professor of BSU (b. 1941)
  - Azadkhan Adigozelov, doctor of pedagogical sciences, professor (b. 1940)
- 27 January — Shaig Safarov, theatrologist (b. 1954)

=== February ===
- 2 February — Aydin Karimov, poet, journalist (b. 1934)
- 3 February — Nariman Shikhaliyev, filmmaker (b. 1934)
- 5 February — Galina Mikeladze, journalist (b. 1931)
- 6 February — Shohlat Afshar, poet (b. 1949)
- 7 February — Ali Vakil, poet, translator (b. 1938)
- 8 February
  - Fikret Hashimov, artist (b. 1948)
  - Eleonora Rajabova, lawyer (b. 1933)
  - Fakhreddin Ali, artist (b. 1938)
- 10 February — Vagif Seyidov, doctor of medical sciences, professor (b. 1941)
- 13 February — Afgan Askerov, writer (b. 1929)
- 15 February — Mammad Chiragov, professor (b. 1938)
- 16 February — Aydin Abiyev, lexicographer, doctor of philological sciences, professor (b. 1939)
- 17 February — Anwar Ahmad, poet, translator (b. 1943)
- 22 February — Kamil Jalilov, composer, musician (b. 1938)
- 24 February — Arif Gaziyev, television director, screenwriter (b. 1938)
- 25 February — Alibaba Mammadov, singer, composer (b. 1929)

=== March ===
- 4 March — Albert Mustafayev, artist (b. 1931)
- 5 March — Zehmet Shahverdiyev, doctor of historical sciences, professor (b. 1942)
- 10 March — Rustam Ibragimbekov, screenwriter, playwright and producer (b. 1939)
- 11 March — Faig Hasanov, chemist (b. 1939)
- 13 March — Ajdar Ismailov, philologist, co-founder of New Azerbaijan Party (b. 1938)
- 15 March — Zaur Yusifov, boxer (b. 1984)
- 17 March — Musa Mammadov, doctor of geology and mineralogy, professor (b. 1940)
- 18 March — Beybala Usubaliyev, doctor of chemical sciences, scientist (b. 1951)
- 21 March — Almaz Taghiyeva, doctor of pedagogical sciences, scientist (b. 1962)
- 22 March — Maksim Shamil, poet (b. 1952)
- 25 March — Reza Baraheni, South Azerbaijani writer, poet, critic (b. 1935)
- 27 March — Ayaz Mutallibov, 14th leader of Azerbaijan SSR (1989–1990) and 1st President (1990–1992) (b. 1938)
- 28 March — Vahdat Sultanzadeh, diplomat (b. 1935)

=== April ===
- 1 April — Zulfugar Abbasov, actor, director (b. 1940)
- 2 April
  - Ali Ismayilov, engineer (b. 1948)
  - Vilayat Kahramanzade, musician, member of "Rast" band (b. ?)
- 8 April — Teymur Bunyadov, doctor of historical sciences, professor (b. 1928)
- 14 April — Ilgar Fatizadeh, economist, statesman (b. 1956)
- 22 April — Ogtay Hajiyev, singer, composer (b. 1951)
- 30 April — Namig Aslanov, police colonel (b. 1965)

=== May ===
- 5 May — Giyas Guliyev, doctor of biological sciences, scientist (b. 1947)
- 11 May
  - Mazahir Suleymanzadeh, journalist (b. 1952)
  - Musa Bagirov, director, screenwriter (b. 1932)
- 16 May — Fuad Valikhanov, TV presenter, producer (b. 1941)
- 19 May
  - Vagif Asadov, actor, director (b. 1947)
  - Tofig Mammadov, doctor of biological sciences, professor (b. 1957)
- 31 May — Tosu Zangilanli, phenomenon (b. 1993)

=== June ===
- 2 June — Rahid Rahmanov, volcanologist, doctor of geology and mineralogy (b. 1936)
- 5 June — Ali Babayev, statesman (b. 1957)
- 7 June — Nasir Ahmadli, doctor of philological sciences, professor (b. 1942)
- 8 June — Intigam Mehdizadeh, writer, publicist, journalist, screenwriter (b. 1945)
- 17 June
  - Muzamil Abdullayev, 1st Minister of Agriculture of Azerbaijan (b. 1941)
  - Alistan Akbarov, scientist, linguist, philologist (b. 1940)
- 20 June
  - Aida Huseynova, musicologist, doctor of philosophy in art studies, professor (b. 1964)
  - Eldar Salayev, doctor of physical and mathematical sciences, scientist, 8th President of ANAS (b. 1933)

=== July ===
- 10 July — Envar Chingizoglu, writer, publicist (b. 1962)
- 11 July — Akif Musayev, economist, scientist, professor (b. 1947)
- 16 July — Mais Mammadov, TV host journalist (b. 1938)
- 17 July — Sevda Ibrahimova, composer (b. 1939)
- 31 July — Aliya Tahmasib, educational worker (b. 1947)

=== August ===
- 3 August — Araz Zeynalov, journalist, publicist (b. 1961)
- 5 August — Ataxan Pashayev, historian (b. 1938)
- 6 August — Zahid Sharifov, doctor of technical sciences, professor (b. 1962)
- 9 August
  - Arif Maharramov, artist (b. 1948)
  - Ramin Mahmudzadeh, scientist, academic (b. 1935)
- 16 August — Firangiz Rahimbeyli, singer, actress (b. 1960)
- 23 August — Hikmet Ibrahimov, doctor of technical sciences, professor, scientist (b. 1951)
- 26 August — Nazim Mammadov, statesman, lieutenant general (b. 1951)
- 27 August — Jamila Hasanzadeh, doctor of art studies, professor, author of the book "Magical Tales of Tabriz" (b. 1947)

=== September ===
- 1 September — Zahid Aliyev, doctor of technical sciences, professor, oil scientist (b. 1935)
- 3 September — Sayavush Mammadzade, poet, translator (b. 1935)
- 4 September — Asif Azerelli, artist (b. 1946)
- 15 September — Khalil Yusifli, doctor of philological sciences, professor, scientist (b. 1935)
- 22 September — Fargana Guliyeva, actress (b. 1957)
- 30 September — Rahim Rahimli, singer, composer (b. 1976)

=== October ===
- 6 October — Araz Alizadeh, politician (b. 1951)
- 9 October — Ruhangiz Gasimova, composer (b. 1940)
- 15 October — Shakir Yagubov, journalist, cultural worker (b. 1951)
- 18 October
  - Yafes Turkses, poet (b. 1954)
  - Ogtay Seyidbeyov, doctor of medical sciences, professor (b. 1940)
- 21 October — Surkhay Taghizadeh, public and statesman, deputy (b. 1932)
- 23 October — Suleyman Abdullayev, singer (b. 1939)
- 26 October — Mashallah Abdullayev, statesman, National Hero (b. 1950)

=== November ===
- 1 November — Leyla Safarova, film director, screenwriter (b. 1945)
- 2 November — Rana Gashgai, doctor of geography, academician (b. 1938)
- 4 November — Fazil Mammadov, politician, Minister of Taxes of Azerbaijan (b. 1964)
- 12 November — Ali Rajabli, doctor of historical sciences, professor, numismatist-archaeologist (b. 1927)
- 15 November — Ikhtiyar Shirinov, politician, 3rd Prosecutor General of Azerbaijan (b. 1952)
- 17 November — Alikhan Niftaliyev, singer, cultural worker (b. 1943)
- 18 November — Nazim Bababeyli, deputy (b. 1953)
- 19 November — Natig Gulmammadov, theater worker (b. 1955)
- 20 November — Nobert Yevdayev, poet, writer, artist, journalist (b. 1929)
- 28 November — Musa Rustamov, doctor of technical sciences, professor, academician (b. 1930)
- 29 November — Ilkin Zarbaliyev, journalist (b. 1977)

=== December ===
- 1 December
  - Yadollah Maftun Amini, South Azerbaijani poet (b. 1926)
  - Rahib Abbasov, medical service colonel, high-ranking therapist (b. 1939)
- 4 December — Aziz Orujov, deputy, Minister of Construction of Nakhchivan Autonomous Republic (b. 1957)
- 8 December
  - Maqsuda Aliyeva, actress (b. 1965)
  - Isfandiyar Karabakhi, South Azerbaijani singer (b. 1942)
- 11 December — Vilayat Aliyev, doctor of philological sciences, professor (b. 1938)
- 15 December — Ogtay Rajabov, composer, doctor of pedagogical sciences, professor (b. 1941)
- 16 December — Sadiq Ahmadov, actor (b. 1960)
- 19 December — Kazim Aliverdibeyov, conductor (b. 1934)
- 20 December
  - Abasgulu Guliyev, chemist, scientist (b. 1940)
  - Asiyat Yusifova, Azerbaijani-Soviet statesman (b. 1923)
- 22 December
  - Fikret Verdiyev, musician (b. 1947)
  - Alakram Humbatov, politician, President of the Republic of Talysh-Mugan, the main causative of the Talysh-Mugan crisis (b. 1948)
- 23 December — Oruj Gurbanov, director (b. 1949)
- 26 December — Nadir Abdullayev, doctor of philological sciences, professor, methodist, pedagogue (b. 1935)
