= 2013 in Azerbaijan =

- Decades: 1990s; 2000s; 2010s; 2020s
- See also: Other events of 2013; Timeline of Azerbaijani history

The following lists events that happened during 2013 in the Republic of Azerbaijan.

== Incumbents ==
- President: Ilham Aliyev
- Prime Minister: Artur Rasizade
- Speaker: Ogtay Asadov

== Events ==
=== January ===
- January 23 – OIC Parliamentary Union recognizes Khojaly Massacre

=== February ===
- February 7 – The Azerbaijan National Aerospace Agency launched its first satellite AzerSat 1 into orbit on 7 February 2013 from Guiana Space Centre in French Guiana at orbital positions 46° East.

=== April ===
- World Economic Forum in Baku

=== May ===
- May 7 – The opening ceremony of First South Caucasus Forum
- May 29–1 June – 2nd World Forum on Intercultural Dialogue

=== June ===
- June 14 – The IV Congress of Azerbaijani Women
- June 26 – The Azerbaijani Armed Forces celebrated their 95th anniversary with a military parade in Baku.

=== September ===
- September 18 – Guba Genocide memorial complex
