= 2007 in Azerbaijan =

- Decades: 1980s; 1990s; 2000s; 2010s; 2020s
- See also: Other events of 2007; Timeline of Azerbaijani history

This is a list of events that took place in the year 2007 in Azerbaijan.

== Incumbents ==
- President: Ilham Aliyev
- Prime Minister: Artur Rasizade
- Speaker: Ogtay Asadov

== Events ==
=== June ===
- June 7: President of the United States George W. Bush and President of Russia Vladimir Putin meet to discuss missile defense. Putin, in a minor reversal of recent rhetoric regarding Bush's European missile shield plans, suggests placing a radar installation in Azerbaijan.

=== August ===
- August 29: Ten people are trapped alive in a collapsed apartment building in Baku, Azerbaijan with at least twelve people having died.

=== October ===
- October 29: The UK embassy in Baku, Azerbaijan, is closed as a precaution after a terrorist attack in the city is prevented. The US embassy also closes its doors after the Azerbaijan Government reports of the thwarting of a "large-scale, horrifying terror attack."

=== November ===
- November 4: Baku–Gazakh motorway minibus crash took place, becoming the country's heaviest road accident in the past ten years.

== Deaths ==
- February 24: Umileyla Mammadova, cotton grower (born 1916)
