= 2009 in Azerbaijan =

- Decades: 1980s; 1990s; 2000s; 2010s; 2020s
- See also: Other events of 2009; Timeline of Azerbaijani history

The following outlines notable events in the year 2009 in Azerbaijan. The Republic of Azerbaijan is the largest country in the Caucasus region, situated at the crossroads of Western Asia and Eastern Europe. It is bordered by the Caspian Sea to the east, Russia to the north, Georgia to the northwest, Armenia to the west, and Iran to the south.

Additionally, the Nakhchivan Autonomous Republic, an exclave of Azerbaijan, shares borders with Armenia to the north and east, Iran to the south and west, and has a short border with Turkey to the northwest.

== Incumbents ==
- President: Ilham Aliyev
- Prime Minister: Artur Rasizade
- Speaker: Ogtay Asadov

== Events ==
=== March ===
- March 18 – 2009 Azerbaijani constitutional referendum

=== April ===
- April 24 – The Cabinet of Ministers of Azerbaijan adopts the State Registration Rules for Joint-Base Airdromes.
- April 27 – Due to the 2009 swine flu pandemic, Azerbaijan severed the import of animal husbandry goods from the United States. The country also introduced sanitary inspections at railroads and in Heydar Aliyev International Airport. All swine-breeding farms were subjected to strict prophylactic control.
- April 27 – A monument to Meshadi Azizbekov in Baku was dismantled. Another monument to Prokopius Dzhaparidze in the capital was permanently removed shortly after.
- April 30 – Thirteen people were killed in the Azerbaijan State Oil Academy shootings.

=== May ===
- May 1 – The state stamp maker Azermarka issued postage stamps dedicated to the 15th anniversary of Azerbaijan's cooperation with NATO.
- May 2 – Baku hosted the international scientific conference Conspectus to a New Thinking in the Modern World, initiated by the Azerbaijan Association of Philosophy and Socio-Political Sciences.
- May 6 – The Azerbaijan State Philharmonic Hall marked the upcoming 200th anniversary of Frédéric Chopin.
- May 15 – Baku hosted the 25th Rhythmic Gymnastics European Championships.
- May 15 – Azerbaijan reached the Eurovision 2009 final.
- May 22 – Israel's El-Al Airlines Boeing 777 flying from Hong Kong to Tel Aviv made an emergency landing in Baku. The engine problem was fixed, and the plane continued its flight.

=== July ===
- July 2 – The Heydar Aliyev Airport suspended its night schedule. The airport operated under normal conditions from 7 a.m. to 12 p.m. According to an AZAL spokesperson, this rule was implemented to allow the population to rest peacefully during the night. He noted that the restrictions do not apply to humanitarian, state, sanitary, or rescue flights, nor to flights that were caught in bad weather and need to land urgently.

=== December ===
- December 20 – The Metro station "Azadlig prospekti" ("Liberty Avenue") was put into operation.
- December 23 – Municipal elections were held in Azerbaijan.

== Deaths ==
- February 13 – Bakhtiyar Vahabzadeh, Azerbaijani poet (born 1925)
