= 2015 in Azerbaijan =

- Decades: 1990s; 2000s; 2010s; 2020s
- See also: Other events of 2015; Timeline of Azerbaijani history

The following lists events that happened during 2015 in the Republic of Azerbaijan.

== Incumbents ==
- President: Ilham Aliyev
- Prime Minister: Artur Rasizade
- Speaker: Ogtay Asadov

== Events ==
=== January ===
- January 3 - Azerbaijan is reported to have gotten casualties from a subversive act during the Nagorno-Karabakh conflict.

=== February ===
- February 26 - The General Assembly of Pennsylvania State of the United States adopted a resolution recognizing Khojaly Massacre.

=== April ===
- April 10 - British Airways Flight 144, serviced by an Airbus A321, makes an emergency landing in Baku due to engine fire, passengers and crew are not harmed.

=== May ===
- May 18 - The 3rd World Forum on Intercultural Dialogue
- May 19 - 16 people are killed in a building fire in Baku.

=== June ===
- June 12–28 - 2015 European Games: Azerbaijan hosts the inaugural edition of the European games.

=== July ===
- July 4 - Nagorno-Karabakh conflict
  - Two Armenian drones are shot down by the Azerbaijani military over Azeri positions.
- July 9 - Azerbaijan Pavilion - Expo Milano 2015,
  - Azerbaijan Pavilion - Expo Milano 2015

=== November ===
- Parliamentary elections was held.
