= Hamletavan =

Hamletavan Համլետավան
- Town
- Location within Armenia Location within Syunik Province
- Coordinates: 39°13′46″N 46°18′30″E
- Country: Armenia
- Province: Syunik
- Named for: Hamlet Kocharyan
- Time zone: UTC+4 (UTC)
  - Summer (DST): UTC+5 (DST)

Hamletavan is a town in the Kapan community of the Syunik Province of Armenia. Hamletavan is situated west of Shgharshik, and east of Nerkin Giratagh.

It was named Hamletavan in the honor of Hamlet Kocharyan, an Armenian soldier.

== See also ==
- Syunik Province
- Kapan Municipality
- Shgharshik
- Nerkin Giratagh
