= 1995 in Azerbaijan =

- Decades: 1970s; 1980s; 1990s; 2000s; 2010s
- See also: Other events of 1995; Timeline of Azerbaijani history

This is a list of events that took place in the year 1995 in Azerbaijan.

== Incumbents ==
- President: Heydar Aliyev
- Prime Minister: Fuad Guliyev
- Speaker: Rasul Guliyev

== January ==
- 11 January - Establishment of diplomatic relations between Uruguay and Azerbaijan

== February ==
- 18 February - Law on the reform of state and collective farms
- 28 February - Establishment of diplomatic relations between Azerbaijan and Nepal

== March ==
- Establishment of the State Commission on Agrarian Reform
- March 2 - Establishment of diplomatic Relations between Azerbaijan and Burundi

== April ==
- 14 April - Adoption of the Statute of the State Commission on Agrarian Reforms

== May ==
- 3 May - The launch of the first Internet network at the Azerbaijan National Academy of Sciences
- 22 May - Establishment of diplomatic relations between Azerbaijan and Laos

== November ==
- 12 November - Adoption of Constitution of Azerbaijan
- 12 November - First Azerbaijani parliamentary election

== December ==
- 5 December - Azerbaijan Airlines Flight A-56 crashes shortly after takeoff from Nakhchivan Airport, killing 52 out of the 82 passengers and crew on board.
