= Shgharshik =

Shgharshik may refer to the following places in Armenia:

- Shgharshik, Aragatsotn
- Shgharshik, Syunik
