= Daşbaşı =

Daşbaşı or Dashbashy may refer to:

- Daşbaşı, Khojavend, Azerbaijan
- Daşbaşı, Khojaly, Azerbaijan
- Dash Bashi, Iran
