= 2014 in Azerbaijan =

- Decades: 1990s; 2000s; 2010s; 2020s
- See also: Other events of 2014; Timeline of Azerbaijani history

The following lists events that happened during 2014 in the Republic of Azerbaijan.

== Incumbents ==
- President: Ilham Aliyev
- Prime Minister: Artur Rasizade
- Speaker: Ogtay Asadov

== Events ==
=== January ===
- January 22 - a 20-year old LGBT rights advocate İsa Şahmarlı hanged himself in his apartment in Baku. According to Eurasianet, his death sparked a debate about LGBT rights in Azerbaijan.

=== February ===
- February 13 - National Congress of Honduras recognizes Azerbaijani territories and Khojaly Massacre

=== March ===
- March 3 - US State of Indiana recognizes the Khojaly Massacre

=== April ===
- April 16 - Inauguration of the National Gymnastics Arena in Baku
- April 23 - Opening of the new air terminal complex at the Heydar Aliyev International Airport
- April 28 - Official opening of the Second Global Open Society Forum in Baku

=== May ===
- May 5 - Inauguration of new buildings of the Central Library of the Azerbaijan National Academy of Sciences and "National Encyclopedia of Azerbaijan" Scientific Centre

=== June ===
- June 5 - The 4th Summit of the Cooperation Council of Turkic Speaking States (Turkic Council)

=== August ===
- August 1 - At least eight Azeri soldiers are killed following clashes with Armenian troops on the border and near the disputed Nagorno-Karabakh region. Azerbaijan said Armenia had also suffered losses, although it did not provide any details.
- August 2 - Five more Azeri troops are killed in overnight fighting with ethnic Armenians in Nagorno-Karabakh. The casualties bring the death toll to at least 13 in a flare-up of violence over the last few days around Nagorno-Karabakh. Russia has said that any further escalation is unacceptable.
- August 3 - Four Azerbaijani soldiers are killed in fresh clashes with Armenian groups near the border of the breakaway Nagorno-Karabakh Republic.
- August 9 - Azerbaijan's President Ilham Aliyev declares a ‘state of war’ with Armenia on Twitter saying "We are not living in peace, we are living in a state of war".

=== September ===
- September 1 - Foreign Affairs Committee of Sudan recognizes Khojaly Massacre
- September 20 - Foundation stone-laying ceremony of the Southern Gas Corridor

=== October ===
- October 2 - The 4th International Humanitarian Forum was held in Baku

=== November ===
- November 12 - Azerbaijan shoots down an Armenian Mil Mi-24 military helicopter.

=== December ===
- December 26 - Inauguration of Heydar Mosque in Baku
