= 2016 in Azerbaijan =

- Decades: 1990s; 2000s; 2010s; 2020s
- See also: Other events of 2016; Timeline of Azerbaijani history

The following lists events that happened during 2016 in Azerbaijan.

== Incumbents ==
- President: Ilham Aliyev
- Prime Minister: Artur Rasizade
- Speaker: Ogtay Asadov

== Events ==
=== January ===
- January 20 - National Council of Slovenia recognizes Khojaly Massacre

=== February ===
- February 11 - US State of Nebraska recognized the Khojaly Massacre
- February 15 - US State of Hawaii recognized the Khojaly Massacre
- February 18 - US State of Montana announced "Khojaly Remembrance Day"
- February 26 - US State of Georgia recognizing Khojaly massacre
- February 26 - US State of Idaho recognized Khojaly massacre

=== March ===
- March 24 - US State of Minnesota accepted a resolution on Khojaly massacre.
- March 29 - Order of the President of Azerbaijan on improving the structure of the Ministry of Culture and Tourism of the Republic.

=== April ===
- April 1–5 - Nagorno-Karabakh clashes

=== June ===
- June 3–4 - Fourth Congress of World Azerbaijanis was held.
- June 15 - Correctional facilities of Azerbaijan starts execution of amnesty act.
- June 19 - European Grand Prix

=== September ===
- September 26 - Azerbaijani constitutional referendum

=== October ===
- October 2 - Visit of Papa Francesco Azerbaijan.

== Death ==
- Jalal Aliyev - Azerbaijani politician, died in Baku on January 31.
- Ilhama Guliyeva - Azerbaijani People's artist, died of thromboembolism on February 25.
- Zelimkhan Yaqub - died on January 9.

== Events ==
- Azerbaijani police used tear gas and water cannons on 15 January on protesters in the Quba District who were protesting the worsening economic situation in the country, leading to the arrest of numerous people.
- Azerbaijan will send 30 athletes to compete in the 2016 Summer Olympics in Rio de Janeiro, Brazil from 5–21 August
