= 2011 in Azerbaijan =

- Decades: 1990s; 2000s; 2010s; 2020s
- See also: Other events of 2011; Timeline of Azerbaijani history

The following lists events that happened during 2011 in the Republic of Azerbaijan.

== Incumbents ==
- President: Ilham Aliyev
- Prime Minister: Artur Rasizade
- Speaker: Ogtay Asadov

== Events ==
=== January ===
- January - Memorandum of Understanding on a strategic energy partnership was signed between Azerbaijan and the EU.

=== February ===
- February 14 - The new TV Channel Medeniyyet TV began to operate.

=== May ===
- May 14 - Ell & Nikki win the Eurovision Song Contest with the song "Running Scared", Azerbaijan's first victory in the contest.

=== July ===
- July 5–6 - III World Azerbaijanis Congress.

=== September ===
- September 19 - Azerbaijan-Austrian business forum.

=== October ===
- October 3 - Hilton Baku Hotel Complex was opened by the participation of Ilham Aliyev.
- October 25 - Azerbaijan became a non-permanent member of the UN Security Council for 2012-2013.

=== November ===
- November 11 - The Azerbaijan-Hungary business forum.
- November 17 - The opening ceremony of Gabala International Airport.

=== December ===
- December 8 - Foreign Relations Committee of Mexico adopted an agreement on the Nagorno Karabakh Conflict
- December 24 - Groundbreaking ceremony of the Baku White City project.
- December 29 - The Intellectual Transportation Management Center was opened in Baku.
- December 30 - "Koroglu" (formerly "Mashadi Azizbayov") station was opened.
