= 2008 in Azerbaijan =

- Decades: 1980s; 1990s; 2000s; 2010s; 2020s
- See also: Other events of 2008; Timeline of Azerbaijani history

The following lists events that happened during 2008 in the Republic of Azerbaijan.

== Incumbents ==
- President: Ilham Aliyev
- Prime Minister: Artur Rasizade
- Speaker: Ogtay Asadov

== Events ==
=== April ===
- April 12 - Baku hosted the 1st Qualifying Tournament in Women's field hockey Qualifyings for the 2008 Summer Olympics.

=== May ===
- May 24 – Azerbaijani duet Elnur Hüseynov and Samir Javadzadeh finishes 8th at the final of the Eurovision Song Contest 2008.

=== June ===
- June 26 - The Azerbaijani Armed Forces celebrates its 90th anniversary.

=== August ===
- August 9 - The 17th season of Azerbaijan Premier League has started.

=== September ===
- September 17 - The Premiliary Round of Azerbaijan Cup 2008–09 has started.

=== October ===
- October 15 - Presidential election took place with Ilham Aliyev being re-elected.

== Sport ==
- 8 August to 24 August – Azerbaijan competes in the 2008 Summer Olympics in Beijing, China. The Azerbaijani Olympic team wins 14 gold medals, coming 6th on the medal tally.

== Deaths ==
- March 5 – Hajibey Sultanov, Azerbaijani astronomer (born 1921)
- October 25 – Muslim Magomayev, Azerbaijani singer (born 1942)
