= 2021 in Azerbaijan =

- Decades: 2000s; 2010s; 2020s
- See also: Other events of 2021; Timeline of Azerbaijani history

This is a list of individuals and events related to Azerbaijan in 2021.

== Incumbents ==
- President: Ilham Aliyev
- Vice President: Mehriban Aliyeva
- Prime Minister: Ali Asadov
- National Assembly Speaker: Sahiba Gafarova

== Events ==
=== Ongoing ===
- COVID-19 pandemic in Azerbaijan

=== January ===
- 4 January – Azerbaijani grandmaster Teimour Radjabov wins the Airthings Masters tournament of the Meltwater Champions Chess Tour.
- 18 January –
  - COVID-19 pandemic: Mass COVID-19 vaccination begins in Azerbaijan, with Sinovac shots.
  - Russian Foreign Minister Sergey Lavrov says that Armenia has returned all Azerbaijani prisoners who were captured during the 2020 Nagorno-Karabakh war.
- 21 January – The presidents of Azerbaijan and Turkmenistan, Ilham Aliyev and Gurbanguly Berdimuhamedow, reach an agreement to jointly develop a hydrocarbon field, which was disputed between the two countries for around 30 years, in the Caspian Sea.
- APFP member Niyameddin Ahmedov faces new charges of incitement and trafficking in banned items; police allegedly beat him in custody.

=== February ===
- Mehdi Ibrahimov receives a 15-month suspended sentence on bogus charges of spreading COVID-19.

=== March ===
- 8 March – Police disperse a women’s rights march in Baku, detaining at least 25 participants, including multiple human rights defenders.
- A presidential pardon releases nearly 40 opposition activists, journalists, and human rights defenders. APFP member Mahammad Imanli is also pardoned.

=== April ===
- APFP activist Said Mamedzade Bakuvi is sentenced to three-and-a-half years for hooliganism, it is later replaced with a suspended sentence.

=== May ===
- 13 May – Armenia accuses Azerbaijan of sending troops across the border in a disputed incident, violating a prior withdrawal agreement. Armenia requests Russian military assistance. Azerbaijan denies any wrongdoing, stating its forces only defend their side of the frontier.
- 21 May – Azerbaijan announces discussions with BP to develop solar energy production in Karabakh, aiming to expand renewable energy investment in the region.

=== June ===
- 4 June – A Kamaz passenger bus carrying journalists and officials hits an anti-tank mine near Susuzluq village, Kalbajar District, killing three people and injuring four others.

=== November ===
- 30 November – The Azerbaijani State Border Service Mil Mi-17 crashes during drills in Garaheybat; 14 killed and 2 injured. An investigation is launched, and the victims are given martyr status.

=== December ===
- 1 December – A peaceful protest in Baku supporting jailed activist Saleh Rustamli is met with force; over 40 are arrested with reports of torture and injuries.

== See also ==
- Outline of Azerbaijan
- List of Azerbaijan-related topics
- History of Azerbaijan
