= Eldar Salayev =

Azerbaijani physician (1933–2022)

- Born: 31 December 1933; Nakhchivan, Azerbaijani SSR, Transcaucasian SFSR, Soviet Union
- Died: 20 June 2022 (aged 88)
- Education: Baku State University
- Occupation: Physicist

Eldar Salayev (Azerbaijani: Eldar Yunis oğlu Salayev; 31 December 1933 – 20 June 2022) was an Azerbaijani physicist. He was President of the Azerbaijan National Academy of Sciences from 1983 to 1997.

== Biography ==
From 1970 to 1973, Salayev was deputy director of Scientific Affairs at the Institute of Physics Azerbaijan National Academy of Sciences. In 1972, he received the State Prize of the Azerbaijan SSR.

Eldar Salayev died on 20 June 2022 at the age of 88.
