= Murtuz Alasgarov =

Azerbaijani politician

- Murtuz Ələsgərov
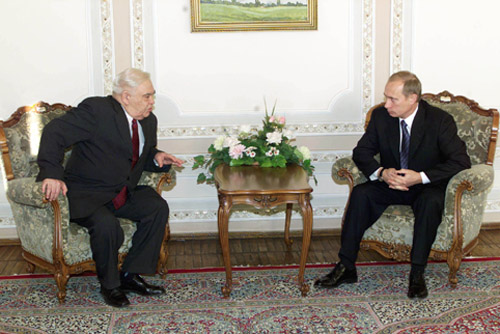
- Alasgarov meeting Vladimir Putin in 2001

Speaker of the National Assembly
- In office October 16, 1996 – December 2, 2005
- President: Heydar Aliyev; Ilham Aliyev
- Preceded by: Rasul Guliyev
- Succeeded by: Ogtay Asadov

Personal details
- Born: Murtuz Najaf oglu Alasgarov; September 20, 1928 Ganja, Azerbaijan SSR, USSR
- Died: August 7, 2012 (aged 83) Baku, Azerbaijan

Murtuz Najaf oglu Alasgarov (Azerbaijani: Murtuz Nəcəf oğlu Ələsgərov; 20 September 1928–7 August 2012), also spelled as Murtuz Aleskerov, was an Azerbaijani politician who served as the Speaker of the National Assembly of Azerbaijan from 1996 to 2005.

== Early life ==
Alasgarov was born on September 20, 1928, in Ganja, Azerbaijan. He graduated from the Law Department of the Azerbaijan State University. From 1954, he was the senior professor and then dean of the Law Department of Azerbaijan State University, and from 1957, the dean of the International Law Department. From 1965, he was the director of the Department of Constitutional Law at the same university. In 1993–1996, he was the Rector of Baku State University. Alasgarov was also an Honorary Doctor of Kiev State University.

== Political career ==
He was elected to the National Assembly of Azerbaijan in the 1995 parliamentary elections and re-elected in the 2000 parliamentary elections. On October 16, 1996, he was elected the Speaker of the National Assembly by the members of the parliament and re-elected on November 24, 2000. He was then replaced by Ogtay Asadov in December 2005. In the 2005 parliamentary elections, Alasgarov was re-elected to the parliament from the Garadag district of Baku.

He was also the Deputy Chairman of the New Azerbaijan Party. According to media reports, Alasgarov did not run for re-election in November 2010 due to diabetes-related health issues.

== Works and awards ==
He has been awarded the İstiqlal (Sovereignty) order, Honorary Diploma of Azerbaijani President award of Azerbaijan, Содружество order of CIS and Order of Friendship of Russia, Gold Medal from WOSCO (World Organization for Scientific Cooperation). He has authored over 30 scientific publications, textbooks and over 200 scientific articles. Alasgarov was a member of Azerbaijani Lawyers and International Law Associations. Alasgarov was fluent in English and Russian.

== Personal life ==
He was married and had three children, to include Fuad Alasgarov, Assistant to the President for Law Enforcement and Military Affairs and member of the Security Council of Azerbaijan.

He died in Baku in 2012 after a long illness.

== See also ==
- Cabinet of Azerbaijan
- Government of Azerbaijan
