= Kazim Aliverdibeyov =

Azerbaijani conductor (1934–2022)

- Kazım Əliverdibəyov
- Born: 27 November 1934; Baku, Baku uezd, Azerbaijan SSR, Transcaucasian Socialist Federative Soviet Republic, Soviet Union
- Died: 19 December 2022 (aged 88); Baku, Azerbaijan SSR, Soviet Union
- Occupation: Conductor
- Father: Aghalar bey Aliverdibeyov

Kazım Aliverdibeyov was (November 27, 1934, Baku – December 19, 2022, Baku) conductor, Honored Art Worker of the Azerbaijan SSR (1978). He was also a personal pensioner of the president of the Republic of Azerbaijan (2010).

== Life ==
Kazım Aliverdibeyov was born in Baku in 1934. From 1944 to 1954, he studied violin at the ten-year music school affiliated with the Azerbaijan State Conservatory (now known as the Uzeyir Hajibeyli Baku Music Academy). After completing his secondary education, he enrolled in the Choral Conducting Faculty of the conservatory. In 1957, while still a student, he was invited to serve as a conductor at the Azerbaijan State Musical Comedy Theater (now the Azerbaijan State Musical Theater). In 1959, he graduated with a higher education degree. A year later, he continued his conducting career at the Azerbaijan State Academic Opera and Ballet Theater.

== Death ==
Kazim Aliverdibeyov died on December 19, 2022.

== Family ==
He is the son of musicologist Agalar beg Aliverdibeyov. He is the brother of violinist Rasim Aliverdibeyov, composer Nazim Aliverdibeyov, and pianist Nushaba Aliverdibeyova.

== Activity ==
He has conducted many opera and ballet performances included in the theater's repertoire, such as "Leyli and Majnun", "Ashiq Qarib", "Gelin Qayasi", "Shah Ismail", "Vagif", "Madame Butterfly", "The Barber of Seville", "Carmen" as well as ballet works like "Don Quixote" (Minkus), "Giselle", "Khazar Ballad", "Bolero", "Pakhita" and "Chopiniana".

In addition to his work in theater, since 1963, he began teaching conducting at the Opera Preparation and Choral Conducting Faculty of the Azerbaijan State Conservatory. In 1985, he was appointed head of the department at the faculty where he worked. Three years later, he was entrusted with the role of chief conductor of the Azerbaijan State Opera and Ballet Theater.

In 1996, he received an invitation from the Turkish government. From that time, he lived in Turkey for ten years. He led the symphony orchestra at 9 Eylül University in Izmir and also taught conducting.

After returning to Baku in 2006, he resumed his work at the Opera and Ballet Theater. At the same time, he was involved in teaching as a staff member of the Opera Preparation Department at the Baku Music Academy. In 2010, he stepped down from his position at the Opera and Ballet Theater. Since then, he has worked as a professor at the Solo Singing and Opera Preparation Department at the Uzeyir Hajibeyli Baku Music Academy.

== Awards ==
- Honored Art Worker of the Azerbaijan SSR — January 10, 1978
- Honorary Certificate of the Azerbaijan SSR Supreme Soviet — May 21, 1970
- Personal Pension of the president of the Republic of Azerbaijan — May 31, 2010
