= 2017 in Azerbaijan =

- Decades: 1990s; 2000s; 2010s; 2020s
- See also: Other events of 2017; Timeline of Azerbaijani history

Events in the year 2017 in Azerbaijan.

== Incumbents ==
- President: Ilham Aliyev
- Vice President: Mehriban Aliyeva (starting 21 February)
- Prime Minister: Artur Rasizade

== Events ==
=== January ===
January 24	Djibouti recognized the Khojaly Massacre as an act of genocide in 2017.

=== March ===
March 14–18	First Baku International Water Week
Mach 16	Started the V Global Baku Forum

=== May ===
May 5–6, 2017	4th World Forum on Intercultural Dialogue
May 12–22	2017 Islamic Solidarity Games

=== June ===
June 25	Azerbaijan Grand Prix

=== August ===
August 1	"Sea Cup-2017" international contest was held within the International Army Games

=== September ===
September 14	Contract of the Century was signed.
September 20-October 1,	2017 Women's European Volleyball Championship

=== October ===
October 30	Opening of the Baku–Tbilisi–Kars railway

=== December ===
December 21	The Parliament of Paraguay recognized the Khojaly massacre as an act of genocide in 2017

== Deaths ==
- 19 January – Jalal Allakhverdiyev, mathematician (b. 1929).

== Gallery ==
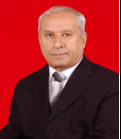
Jalal Allakhverdiyev

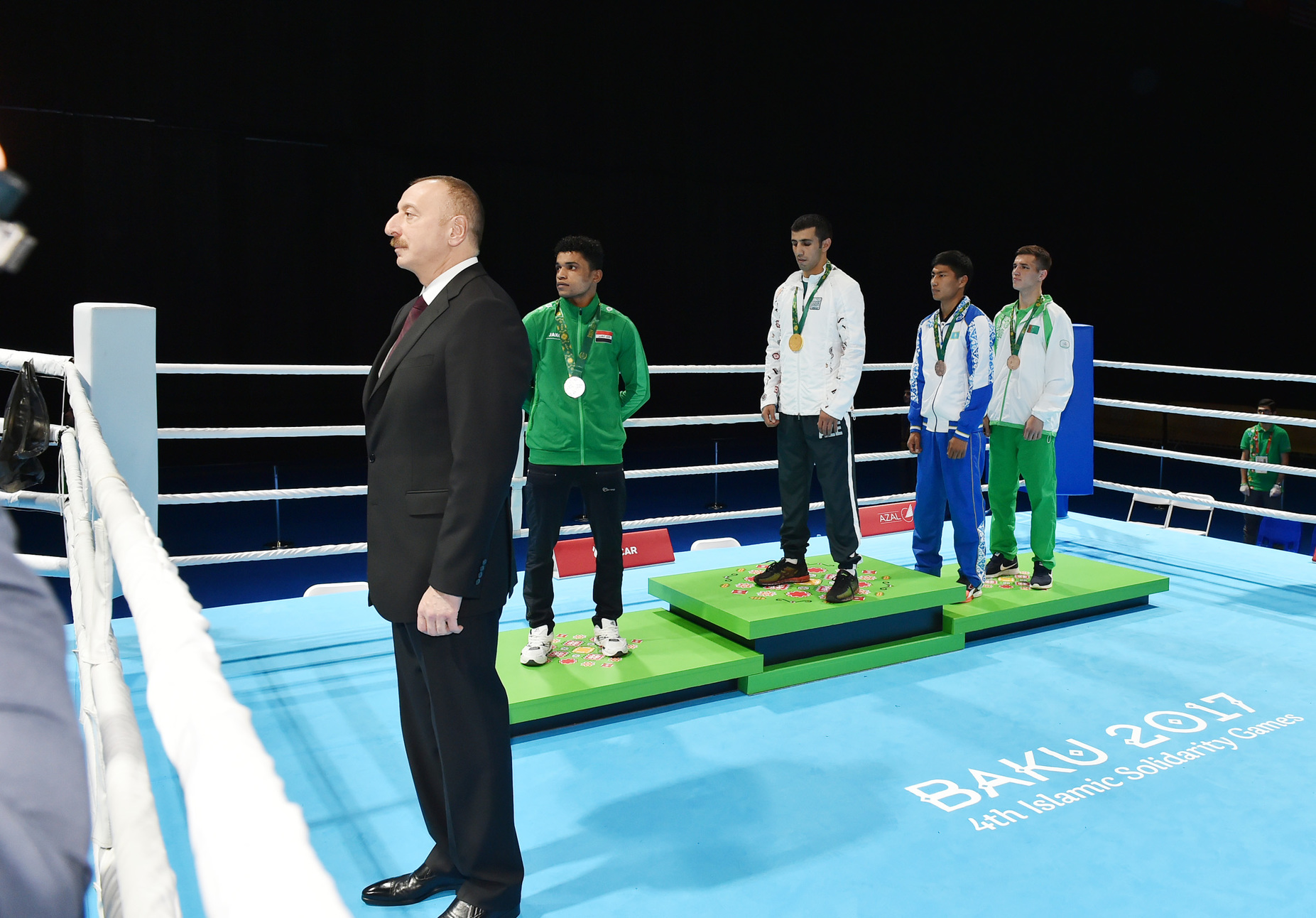
Boxing at the 2017 Islamic Solidarity Games
