= 2018 in Azerbaijan =

- Decades: 1990s; 2000s; 2010s; 2020s
- See also: Other events of 2018; Timeline of Azerbaijani history

The following lists events that occurred in 2018 in Azerbaijan.

== Incumbents ==
- President: Ilham Aliyev
- Vice President: Mehriban Aliyeva
- Prime Minister: Artur Rasizade (until 21 April), Novruz Mammadov (starting 21 April)

== Events ==
=== February ===
| February 9 | Ilham Aliyev signed a decree on establishment of Theology Institute of Azerbaijan |
| February 9–25 | 1 athlete from Azerbaijan will compete at the 2018 Winter Olympics. |

=== March ===
| March 15–17 | V World forum on Intercultural dialogue was held |

=== April ===
| April 11 | Ilham Aliyev wins the 2018 presidential elections. |
| April 21 | Approval of the new composition of the Cabinet of Ministers. |
| April 27–29 | 2018 Azerbaijan Grand Prix |

=== May ===
| May 14 | Port of Baku was opened on 14 May 2018 at Alat. |
| May 28 | The centennial anniversary of the founding of the Azerbaijan Democratic Republic (ADF). |
| May 29 | Opening of Southern Gas Corridor |

=== June ===
| June 5 | Opening ceremony of the BMX World Championships |
| June 11 | President Ilham Aliyev opened a new missile base at Pirəkəşkül. |
| June 26 | The centennial of the Azerbaijani Armed Forces. |

=== September ===
| September 15 | The military parade was held on occasion of 100th anniversary of Baku's liberation |
| September 21 | 100th anniversary of the Azerbaijani parliament |
| September 20–27 | 2018 World Judo Championships |

=== October ===
| October 25–26 | VI Baku International Humanitarian Forum |

=== November ===
| November 16 | A 4,000-year-old game was found in Azerbaijan |

== Gallery ==
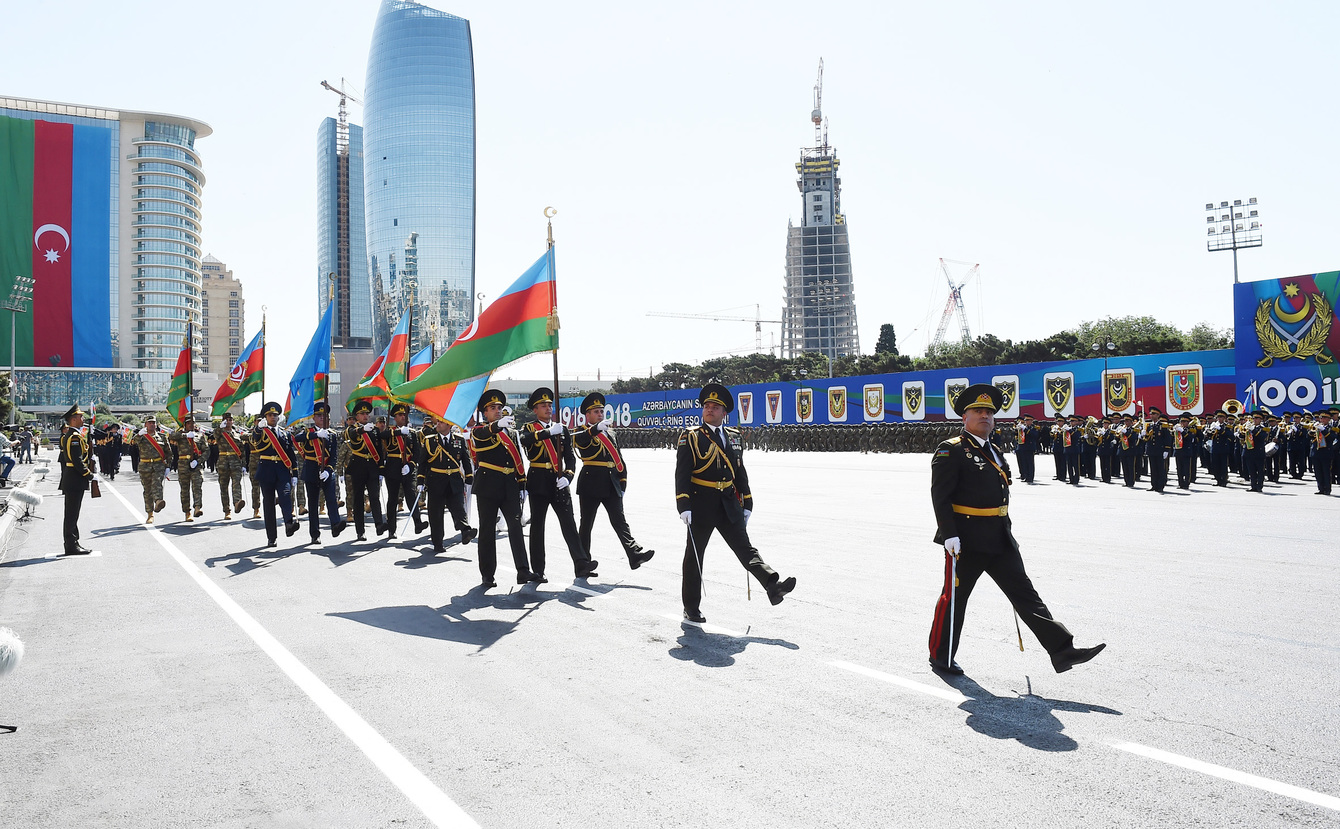
The military parade.

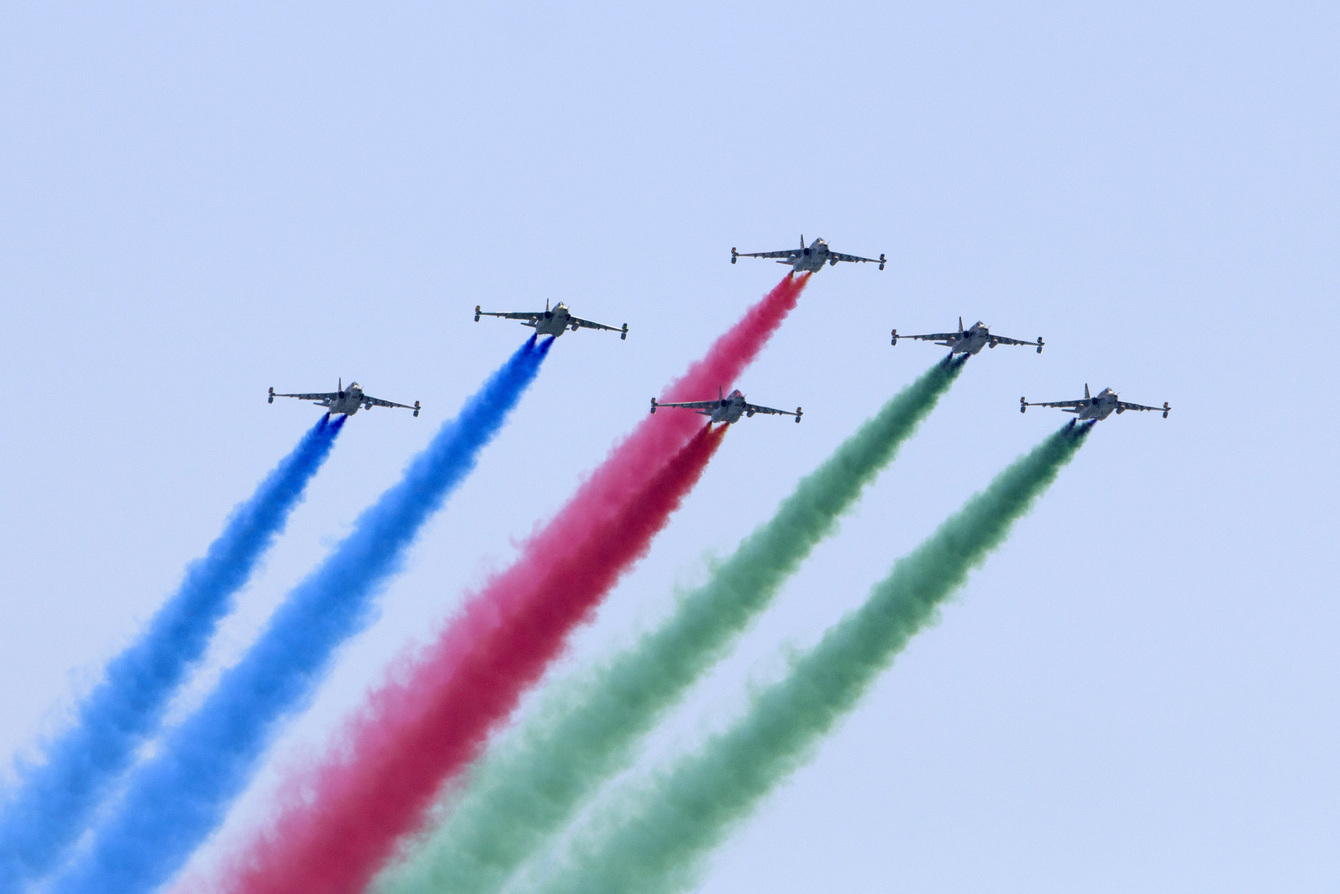

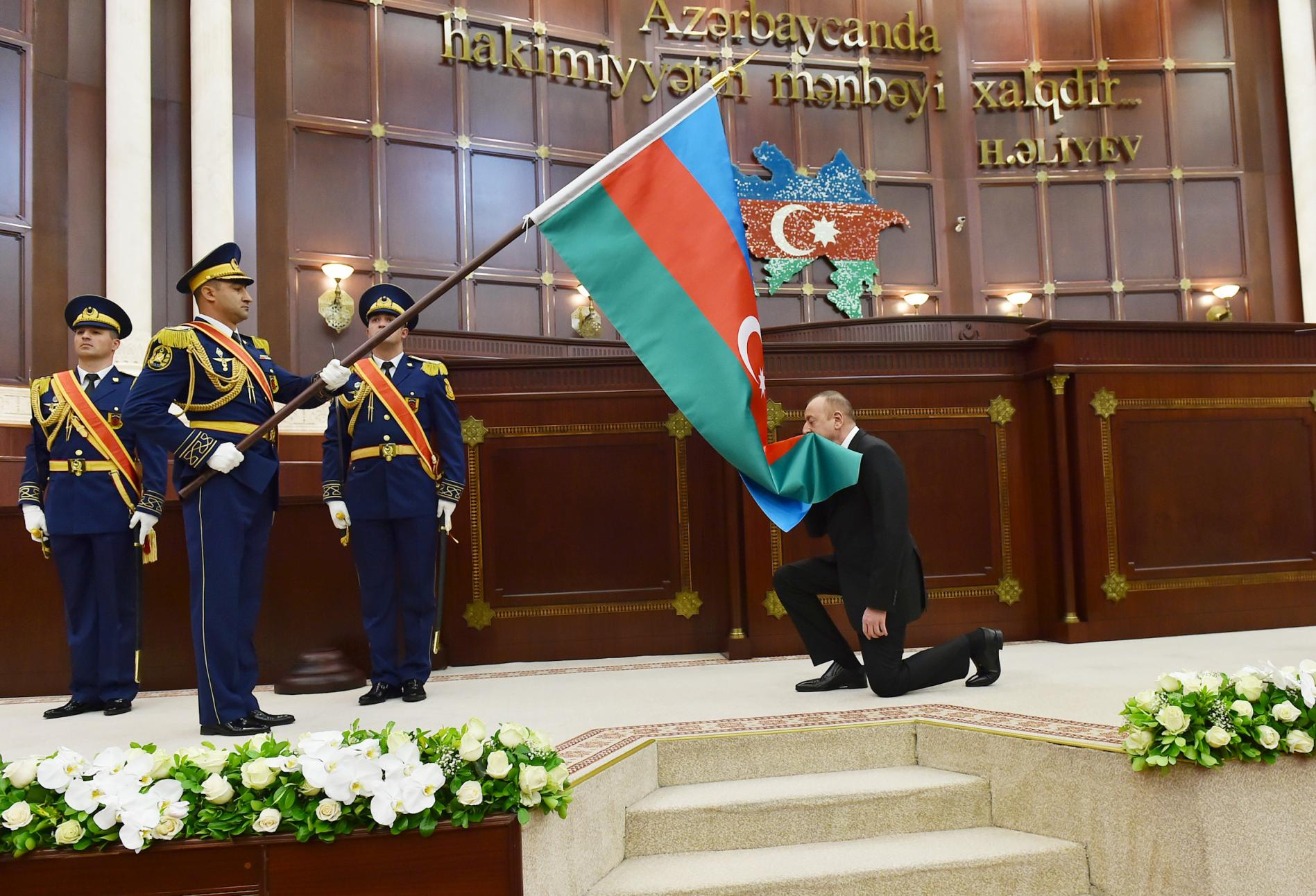
The inauguration ceremony of Ilham Aliyev.

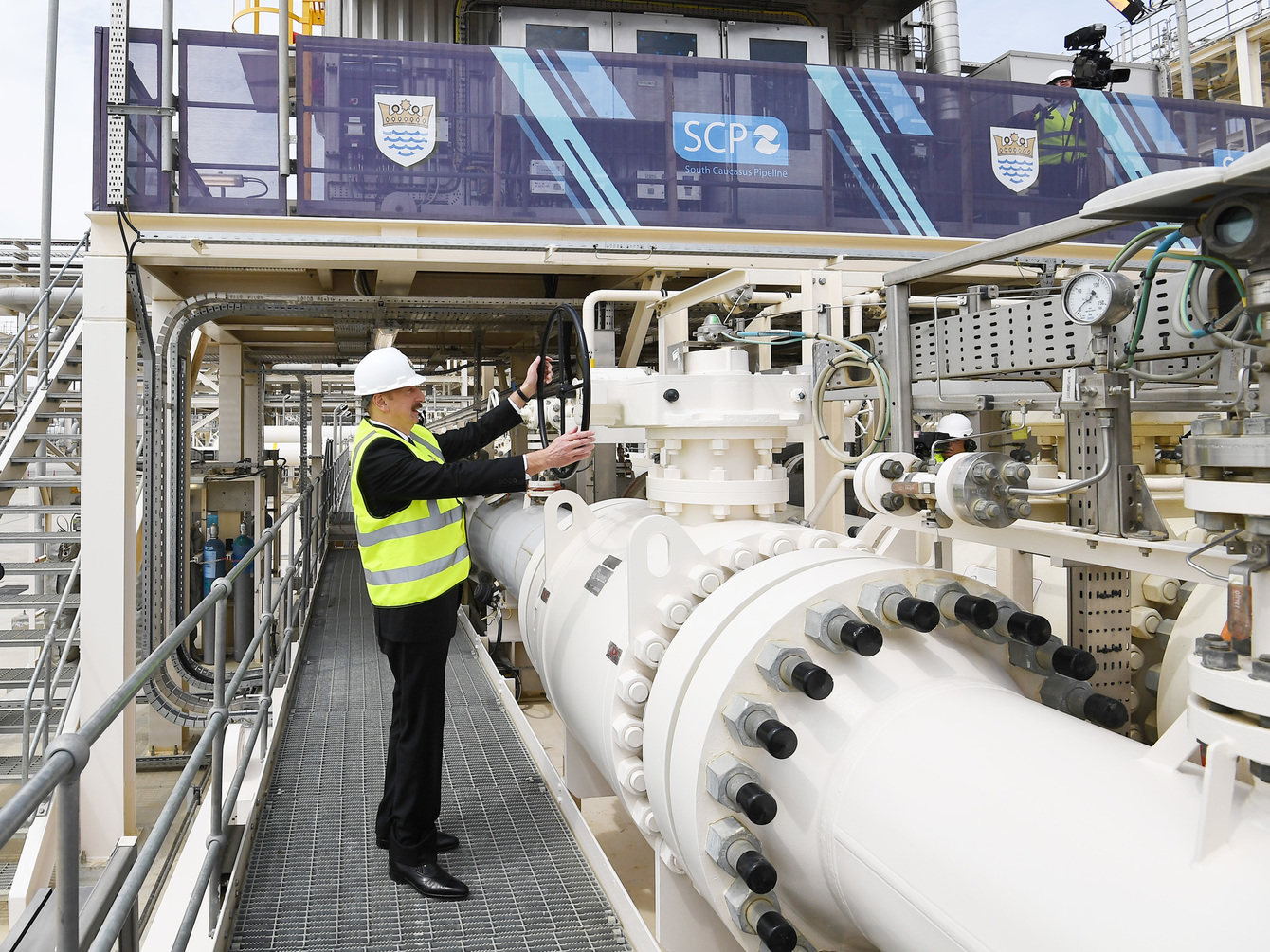
Ilham Aliyev attended official opening ceremony of Southern Gas Corridor. Sangachal Terminal
