= 1991 in Azerbaijan =

- Decades: 1970s; 1980s; 1990s; 2000s; 2010s
- See also: Other events of 1991; Timeline of Azerbaijani history

This is a list of events that took place in the year 1991 in Azerbaijan.

== Incumbents ==
- President: Ayaz Mutallibov (starting 5 February)
- Prime Minister: Hasan Hasanov (starting 7 February)

== February ==
Date	Events
February 5	Renaming of the Azerbaijan SSR as the Republic of Azerbaijan
February 5	Approval of the triangular flag of the People's Republic of Azerbaijan as the State Flag of the Republic of Azerbaijan

== March ==
Date	Events
March 18	Establishment of Khazar University.
March 17	Holding a referendum on the union's maintenance in the USSR.

== June ==
Date	Events
June 21	Signing a decree on Award of the Hero of the Soviet Union, Major-General Hazi Aslanov with the Order of Lenin and the second Golden Star medal by the USSR President Mikhail Gorbachev

== August ==
Date	Events
August 30	Declaration on the Restoration of State Independence of Azerbaijan

== September ==
Date	Events
September 5	The establishment of Ministry of Defense of the Republic of Azerbaijan
September 8	Azerbaijani presidential election

== October ==
Date	Events
October 18	Adoption of the Constitutional Act “On the State Independence of the Republic of Azerbaijan”
October 18	Restoration of State Independence

== December ==
Date	Events
December 29	Azerbaijani independence referendum
