= Farrukh Zeynalov =

Azerbaijani politician (1942–2022)

Member of the National Assembly of Azerbaijan
- In office 2005–2010

Minister of Material Resources
- In office 1992–1997
- Preceded by: position established
- Succeeded by: position abolished

Personal details
- Born: 4 May 1942 Bilgəh, Azerbaijani SSR, Soviet Union
- Died: 13 January 2022 (aged 79)
- Party: Independent

Farrukh Zeynalov (Azerbaijani: Fərrux Zeynalov; 4 May 1942 – 13 January 2022) was an Azerbaijani politician. An independent, he served in the National Assembly from 2005 to 2010. He died on 13 January 2022, at the age of 79.
