= Milan Sedláček =

Czech mountain climber (1961–2012)

- Born: 1 October 1961
- Died: 20 May 2012 (aged 50); Lhotse, Nepal

Milan Sedláček (1 October 1961 – 20 May 2012) was a Czech mountaineer. In 2002, he climbed his first eight-thousander, Shishapangma. In 2005 and 2007 respectively he unsuccessfully tried to climb K2. In 2010, he tried to climb Lhotse but reached only 7,800 metres (25,600 ft). Sedláček died on the descent of Lhotse in 2012, and his body lay just a few meters below the summit for more than a decade. In 2024, Sedláček's body was recovered by a team of Sherpas cleaning Lhotse's peak.
