= Firangiz Rehimbeyli =

Azerbaijani singer (1960–2022)

- Also known as: Firəngiz Rəhimbəyova
- Born: 5 August 1958; Baku, Azerbaijan SSR, USSR
- Died: 16 August 2022 (aged 64) Los Angeles, California, U.S.
- Genres: Pop
- Occupations: Singer; actress
- Instrument: Vocals
- Years active: 1980s-2022

Firangiz Rehimbeyli (Azerbaijani: Firəngiz Rəhimbəyli, [firæŋˈɟis ræhimbæjˈli]; 5 August 1958 – 16 August 2022) was an Azerbaijani singer and actress.

== Biography ==
Firangiz Rahimbeyova was born on 5 August 1958 in Baku. Her mother Raisa died at a very early age. Her father remarried, this time to Sona, an employee of the Azerbaijan National Academy of Sciences. Rehimbeyli was raised mostly by her stepmother.

In the 1980s she starred in an Azerbaijani television variety show. At the end of the 1980s, Rehimbeyli became one of the founders of modern Azerbaijani pop music. Rehimbeyli worked with composers such as Rafig Babayev, Eldar Mansurov, and Ogtay Kazimov, with songs such as "Əgər məni unutsan", "Bu sevgi", "İnanıram sevgiyə", "Bizim dağlar", "Ana torpaq", "Məhəbbətim gələcək", "Gülə-gülə", "Bəri bax", and "Oğlan". Rehimbeyli was also an actress in a number of films, her biggest success was the role of Sevda in the film "Bəxt üzüyü".

After divorcing her first husband, Rehimbeyli moved to Los Angeles, California, USA with her daughter Raisa in 1993. After moving to America, her daughter changed her name to Rachel. In 1999, Rehimbeyli married American architect Raymond Anthony. Rehimbeyli was engaged in small business and sang in Russian restaurants, mainly in Los Angeles. In 2017, at the invitation of Tahir Imanov, Rehimbeyli came to Baku and reprised her role as Sevda in "Bakht uzyugyu 2".

Rehimbeyli died of a heart attack on 16 August 2022, at the age of 64.

== Filmography ==
=== Film ===
Title	Year	Role	Notes
The Legend of Gümüşgöl (Azerbaijani: Gümüşgöl əfsanəsi)	1984	singer	
Abduction of the Bridegroom (Azerbaijani: Bəyin oğurlanması)	1985		
The Engagement Ring (Azerbaijani: Bəxt üzüyü)	1991	Sevda	
The Engagement Ring 2 (Azerbaijani: Bəxt üzüyü 2)	2017	Sevda	
