= Ramin Mahmudzade =

Azerbaijani academic (1935–2022)

- Ramin Mahmudzadə
- Born: August 31, 1935; Baku
- Died: August 9, 2022; Baku
- Citizenship: Azerbaijan
- Father: Ali Nazem
- Scientific career
- Fields: Physics, Mathematics
- Institutions: Azerbaijan Ministry of Education

Ramin Mahmudzade (Azerbaijani: Ramin Əlinazim oğlu Mahmudzadə; August 31, 1935, Baku – August 9, 2022) — candidate of physics-mathematical sciences, associate professor, head of preparatory work for the All-Union and International Olympiads in informatics for schoolchildren, rector of the Public Institute "Mathematical Methods in Production" under the Baku "Knowledge" Society (1985–1990), head of the Education Informatization Resource Center (1999–2003), Head of Focal Point UNESCO in Azerbaijan (2002–2005), Chairman of the "Information Technologies in Education" Methodological Council of the Ministry of Education, honored teacher, was awarded the Shohrat Order in 2005.

He is known as a scientist who prepared the first Azerbaijani specialists in the field of IT.

He had a great role in the development of computer science (informatics), which was emerging in Azerbaijan in the second half of the 20th century. In this regard, he was also considered the first programmer of Azerbaijan.

== Life ==
Ramin Mahmudzade was born on August 31, 1935, in Baku. He graduated from high school in Ukraine in 1953. In 1953, he entered the Dnepropetrovsk Mining Institute. In 1956, he entered the Faculty of Mechanics and Mathematics of Azerbaijan State University. In 1958, he continued his studies at the Leningrad State University, and in 1961 he graduated from it.

From 1961 to 1968, he worked as an assistant at the Faculty of Mechanics and Mathematics of Azerbaijan State University. In 1968-1973, he was the head of the department at the Institute of Theoretical Chemical Problems of Azerbaijan SA. In 1973, he returned to Baku State University and taught at the Faculty of Applied Mathematics and Cybernetics. First, he worked as a senior teacher, after defending his candidate's thesis, he worked as an associate professor and head of the department.

In the early 1970s, he was the founder of programming classes in secondary schools numbered 164, then 134 in the republic.

In 1989, he was the head of the All-Union Pilot Project on the introduction of computers in schools in the Republic. He was the chairman of the jury in almost all interschool informatics Olympiads across the country. Since 1989, he has been the head of the republic's All-Union Olympiad team in informatics, and since 1994, he has been the head of the International Olympiad team. In many IT companies and banks in the country and in several countries of the world, personnel who have studied Applied mathematics and Economic Cybernetics and passed the Ramin Mahmudzade school work. Since 1999, he has been the chairman of the "Information Technologies in Education" Methodological Council of the Ministry of Education.
