= Baku–Gazakh motorway minibus crash =

2007 motor vehicle incident in Azerbaijan

Details
- Date: 22:30 AZT, November 4, 2007
- Location: Baku–Gazakh motorway, Azerbaijan

Statistics
- Bus: Mercedes-Benz
- Vehicles: Kamaz truck
- Deaths: 14
- Injured: 4

The Baku–Gazakh motorway minibus crash occurred on November 4, 2007 at about 22:30 local time (18:30 UTC) in the Qaradağ Raion of Baku, Azerbaijan, on the 51st kilometre of Baku–Gazakh motorway. The crash became the country's worst road accident of the decade.

A Mercedes-Benz minibus, carrying twenty persons on their way back from a wedding, slammed into a parked Kamaz truck, laden with stones. Fourteen people including the driver died. Four of those killed were children and six were women, and four other people were injured.

The injured were taken to a military hospital in Ələt. The Qaradağ police office instituted a criminal proceeding on article 263.3 (violating traffic rules and usage of vehicles, causing death of two or more persons) of the Criminal Code of Azerbaijan.
