= Aziz Orujov =

Azerbaijani journalist

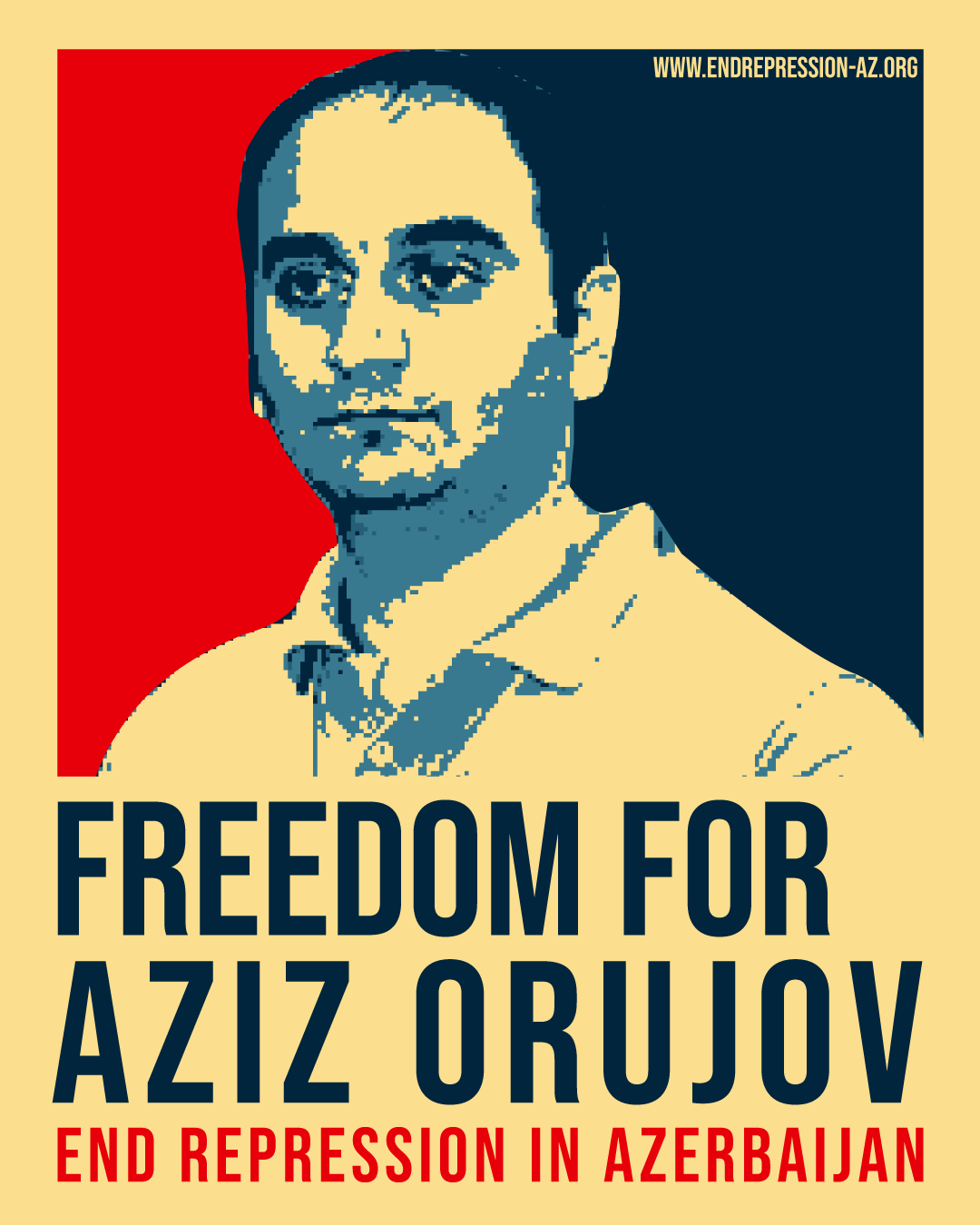
Poster in solidarity with Aziz Orujov, 2025

Aziz Orujov (born 3 January 1984 in Barda District) is a journalist from Azerbaijan.

From 2001 to 2005, Orujov studied at the Faculty of Journalism at Baku State University and obtained a bachelor's degree. After graduation, he worked for newspapers such as Sharg, Millet, and Ayna. In 2008, together with his brother Anar Orujov, he founded the online television channel Kanal 13 and headed its office in Baku. The channel covers domestic and foreign political issues, including human rights violations.

On 2 May 2017, Aziz Orujov was arrested for allegedly disobeying a police officer's orders. On 2 June 2017, he was charged with failing to declare and pay taxes on donations received by the Caucasus Media Investigations Centre Public Union, founded in 2006. He was sentenced to six years in prison. Amnesty International stated that Orujov had been imprisoned solely for peacefully exercising his work as a journalist. On 5 April 2018, the Supreme Court of Azerbaijan ordered his release and suspended his sentence.

On 27 November 2023, Orujov was arrested at his home and detained for three months by order of the Sabail District Court in Baku. His laptops were confiscated. Authorities claimed he had built his house without permission and later accused him of "collective smuggling". On 20. Dezember 2023 a court in Baku decided that the access to the YouTube-Channel of Kanal13 is to be blocked. The smuggling charge was dropped in December 2024. On 26 February 2025, he was sentenced to two years in prison. The Committee to Protect Journalists advocates for his release.

Orujov is married to Lamiya Orujova. They have two daughters.
