= Yeni Günəşli =

Coordinates: 40°23′09″N 49°58′52″E

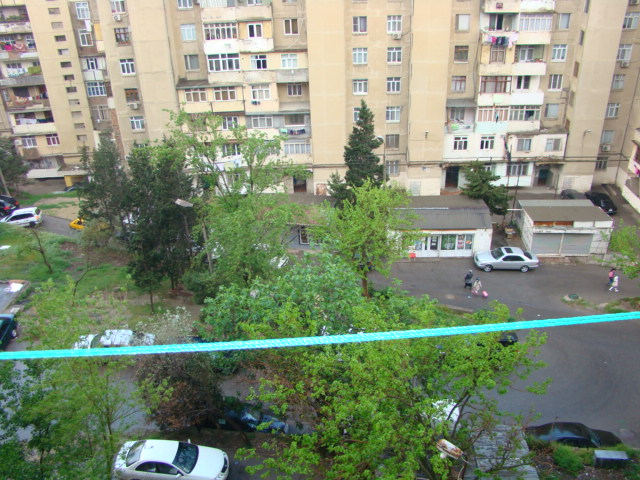
- Interactive map of Yeni Günəşli

Yeni Günəşli is a settlement in the municipality in the Surakhany raion of Baku, Azerbaijan. It has a population of 46,300.

== Transportation ==
The Yeni Gunesli Metro Station is planned in this area by Baku Metro in the future.
