= 2010 in Azerbaijan =

- Decades: 1990s; 2000s; 2010s; 2020s
- See also: Other events of 2010; Timeline of Azerbaijani history

Major events of 2010 in Azerbaijan.

== Incumbents ==
- President: Ilham Aliyev
- Prime Minister: Artur Rasizade

== Events ==
=== January ===
- January 20 - The opening of monumental complex to 20 January in Baku.

=== February ===
- February 18 - Three Azerbaijani soldiers were killed and one wounded as a result of the 2010 Nagorno-Karabakh skirmish.
- February 25 - Massachusetts State of the United States recognizes Khojaly massacre.

=== April ===
- April 13 - 2010 European Wrestling Championships opened in Baku (ended on April 18).
- April 25 - 2010 Youth World Amateur Boxing Championships opened in Baku (ended on May 3).

=== May ===
- May 23 - The 2009–10 Azerbaijan Cup final between FK Baku and FK Khazar Lankaran took place in Baku.

=== October ===
- October 26 - The eighteenth season of Azerbaijan Cup competitions was opened.

=== November ===
- November 7 - 2010 parliamentary election was held.
- November 19 - Two opposition bloggers, Adnan Hajizade and Emin Milli, were released from imprisonment.
