= Ramiz Abutalibov =

Azerbaijani historian and diplomat (1937–2022)

- Born: Ramiz Abutalıb oğlu Abutalıbov; 27 October 1937; Kirovabad, Azerbaijan Soviet Socialist Republic, USSR
- Died: 1 January 2022 (aged 84); Moscow, Russia
- Other names: Ramiz Abutalyboglu
- Occupation(s): Historian and diplomat

Signature
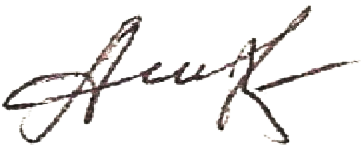

Ramiz Abutalib oğlu Abutalibov (27 October 1937 – 1 January 2022) was an Azerbaijani historian and diplomat.

== Life and career ==
Born in Kirovabad, Abutalibov graduated in geology at the Baku State University, and worked at the State Committee on Science and Technology of the Council of Ministers of the Azerbaijan Soviet Socialist Republic and at the USSR Ministry of Foreign Affairs. In 1972 he was employed by UNESCO, for which he organized several conferences and exhibitions about Azerbaijani culture. He was a member of the Azerbaijani parliament during the USSR tenure, and in 1993 served as ambassador-at-large for the Ministry of Foreign Affairs and as Secretary-General of the Azerbaijan's Commission for UNESCO.

His activity as a historian was mainly focused on Azerbaijani emigration in France, and among his major works there was the 4-volume book Paris Archive. 1919-1940, that he edited in collaboration with the French-Georgian researcher Georges Mamulia.

During his life, Abutalibov was the recipient of several awards and accolades, including the French Legion of Honour and a Medal of Pushkin for his services to the development of culture and art. He died in Moscow on 1 January 2022, at the age of 84.
