= 1994 in Azerbaijan =

- Decades: 1970s; 1980s; 1990s; 2000s; 2010s
- See also: Other events of 1994; Timeline of Azerbaijani history

This is a list of events that took place in the year 1994 in Azerbaijan.

== Incumbents ==
- President: Heydar Aliyev
- Prime Minister: Surat Huseynov (until 7 October); Fuad Guliyev (from 7 October)

== Overview ==
Azerbaijan Gymnastics Federation was the part of International Federation of Gymnastics (FIG).

Association of Football Federations of Azerbaijan became the Member of UEFA and FIFA.

== Annual events by month ==
=== May ===
May 4	Azerbaijan joined the Partnership for Peace programme of NATO
May 5	Bishkek Protocol was signed.

=== July ===
July 26	Establishment of the Ministry of Youths and Sports

=== September ===
September 20	Signing the "Contract of the Century"

=== October ===
October 15	Heydar Aliyev signed a decree on the "Celebration of October 18 as a State Independence Day.
