= Rasul Guliyev =

Azerbaijani Politician and author

- Rəsul Quliyev
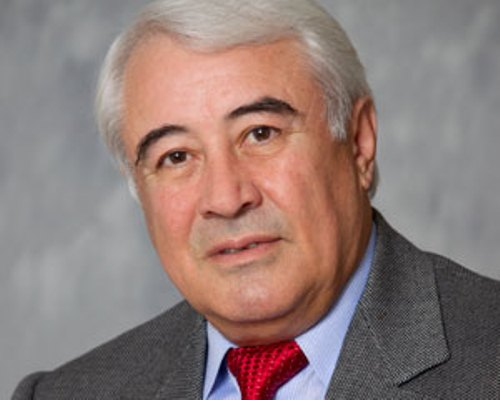
- Guliyev in 2012

Speaker of the National Assembly
- In office November 12, 1995 – September 11, 1996
- President: Heydar Aliyev
- Preceded by: Position established (Himself as Chairman of the Supreme Soviet of Azerbaijan)
- Succeeded by: Murtuz Alasgarov

Chairman of the Supreme Soviet of Azerbaijan
- In office November 5, 1993 – November 12, 1995
- President: Heydar Aliyev
- Preceded by: Heydar Aliyev
- Succeeded by: Position abolished (Himself as Speaker of the National Assembly of Azerbaijan)

Personal details
- Born: December 10, 1947 (age 78) Qazanci, Nakhchivan ASSR, Azerbaijan SSR, Soviet Union
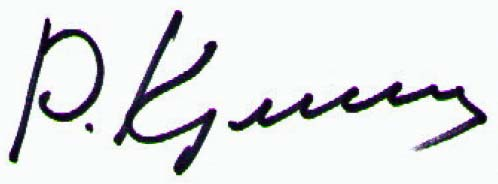
- Signature

Rasul Guliyev (Azerbaijani: Rəsul Bayram oğlu Quliyev; born 10 December 1947) is an Azerbaijani politician who served as the Speaker of the National Assembly of Azerbaijan from 1993 to 1996.

== Biography details ==
=== Early years ===
Guliyev was born on December 10, 1947, in the Gazanchy village of the Nakhchivan Autonomous Republic of Azerbaijan. After completing his secondary education in 1965, he entered the Chemistry-Technology faculty of the Oil And Chemistry Institute of Azerbaijan, graduating in 1970 and gaining the profession of a technologist-engineer. He then started working for Chemistry Plants of Azerbaijan in Sumgait. From 1971 to 1992, Guliyev worked in the Baku Oil Refinery Plant as a technologist, chief of workshop, engineer, chief engineer, and director. At the same time, he was elected a deputy to the Baku Soviet of Deputies, and a deputy to the Supreme Soviet of Azerbaijan SSR in 1990.

He was appointed the vice-president of the State Oil Company of Azerbaijan Republic (SOCAR) and, on December 7, 1992, chief of the Main Oil and Gas Processing Office.

=== Political career ===
From 11 May 1993 to 9 November 1993, Guliyev worked as the Deputy Prime Minister of Azerbaijan. From November 1993 to November 1995, he was the Chairman of the Supreme Soviet of Azerbaijan. In 1995 Guliyev was re-elected a member of the Milli Majlis and speaker of the parliament of Azerbaijan. He resigned from the post of Speaker of Parliament on September 11, 1996.

Guliyev is a reformist-democrat in terms of his economic-political views. He emigrated to the United States in 1996.

Rasul Guliyev has presented briefings to United States policy makers in numerous forums, including those sponsored by the National Democratic Institute for International Affairs, the International Republican Institute, the Tom Lantos Human Rights Commission, the Carnegie Endowment for International Peace, and the Kennan Institute of the Woodrow Wilson International Center for Scholars.

He has testified before the Commission on Security and Cooperation in Europe on the issue of Elections, Democratization and Human rights in Azerbaijan.

Prefers peace talks for the resolution of the Nagorno-Karabakh conflict. He is a supporter of defending the rights of free press and free capitalists. He is also a supporter of useful cooperation with close geographic neighbors of Azerbaijan and all countries. He considers democracy a priority in the internal policy of Azerbaijan, and peace and democracy in foreign policy.

Considers guaranteed participation of foreign investment in the Azerbaijani industry both acceptable and necessary. Possesses wide relations in international official political circles. In exile, he has been the leader of Azerbaijan Democratic Party.

During the past several years Rasul Guliyev, has devoted his efforts to writing political and historical books that reveal the realities of life in Azerbaijan today. His books have enjoyed widespread interest in the Azerbaijani diaspora forced to leave their homeland because of political persecution.

He is married and has three children.

== Works and awards ==
Rasul Guliyev is author of a series of inventions and utilization suggestions and has a master's degree in technical sciences. He has been rewarded with the honorary award of the H.Z.Taghiyev Charity Foundation for his charitable work.

Rasul Guliyev is author of the books:

- Oil And Politics, U.S. 1997, ISBN 0-914481-81-9.
- Path To Democracy, 1997, ISBN 0-914481-86-X.
- Purpose Of Our Struggle.
- Against The Tide, 2010, ISBN 978-1-4500-9149-7, ISBN 978-1-4500-9148-0, ISBN 978-1-4500-9150-3.
- The Cost of Truth, 2011, ISBN 978-1-4628-7298-5, ISBN 978-1-4628-7297-8, ISBN 978-1-4628-7299-2.
- A Dissident's Destiny, 2013.

== See also ==
- Speaker of the National Assembly of Azerbaijan
- Supreme Soviet of Azerbaijan
- National Assembly of Azerbaijan
- Politics of Azerbaijan
- Foreign relations of Azerbaijan
- List of political parties in Azerbaijan
