= 2019 in Azerbaijan =

- Decades: 1990s; 2000s; 2010s; 2020s
- See also: Other events of 2019; Timeline of Azerbaijani history

Events from the year 2019 in Azerbaijan.

== Incumbents ==
- President: Ilham Aliyev
- Vice President: Mehriban Aliyeva
- Prime Minister: Novruz Mammadov (until 8 October), Ali Asadov (starting 8 October)

== Events ==
- 21–27 July: The 2019 European Youth Summer Olympic Festival is held in Baku.
- 8, 19 and 20 October: Protests in Baku.

== Deaths ==
- 9 May – Arif Malikov, composer
