= 1992 in Azerbaijan =

- Decades: 1970s; 1980s; 1990s; 2000s; 2010s
- See also: Other events of 1992; Timeline of Azerbaijani history

This is a list of events that took place in the year 1992 in Azerbaijan.

== Incumbents ==
- President:
  - until 6 March: Ayaz Mutallibov
  - 6 March-4 May: Yagub Mammadov (acting)
  - 4 May-18 May: Ayaz Mutallibov
  - 19 May-16 June: Isa Gambar
  - starting 16 June: Abulfaz Elchibey
- Prime Minister:
  - until 4 April: Hasan Hasanov
  - 4 April-14 May: Firuz Mustafayev (acting)
  - starting 14 May: Rahim Huseynov

== January ==
January 17	Adoption of the law "On the declaration of the 20th January “Martyrs Day” by National Council, the Permanent Workers' Body of the Supreme Council of the Azerbaijan Republic "
January 19	Recognition of the independence of Azerbaijan by the Iceland
January 30	Building up diplomatic relations between Azerbaijan and the Democratic People's Republic of Korea
January 30	Foundation of customs service
January 31	Building up diplomatic relations between Azerbaijan and Ukraine

== February ==
Date	Events
February 10	Building up diplomatic relations between Azerbaijan and Mexico
February 16	Azerbaijan became the Member of the Economic Cooperation Organization (ECO)
February 20	Building up diplomatic relations between Azerbaijan and Germany and Austria
February 21	Building up diplomatic relations between Azerbaijan and France and Poland
February 25	Building up diplomatic relations between Azerbaijan and the Yemen Arab Republic
February 26	Khojaly Massacre
February 26	Building up diplomatic relations between Azerbaijan and Bangladesh
February 28	Building up democratic relations between the Azerbaijan Republic and the United States and India (these countries recognized the independence of Azerbaijan on 25 December and 26 December in 1991).

== March ==
Date	Events
March 2	Admission of Azerbaijan to the United Nations
March 12	Foundation of Internal Troops of Azerbaijan

== April ==
Date	Events
April 4	Signing of a convention on the establishment of diplomatic relations between Azerbaijan and the Russian Federation and Egypt

== May ==
Date	Events
May 27	Adoption of the law "On the National Anthem of the Azerbaijan Republic" by the Parliament of Azerbaijan

== June ==
Date	Events
June 3	Adoption of Azerbaijan as a member of UNESCO

== September ==
Date	Events
September 13	Foundation of SOCAR
