= 2012 in Azerbaijan =

- Decades: 1990s; 2000s; 2010s; 2020s
- See also: Other events of 2012; Timeline of Azerbaijani history

The following lists events that happened during 2012 in the Republic of Azerbaijan.

== Incumbents ==
- President: Ilham Aliyev
- Prime Minister: Artur Rasizade

== Events ==
=== January ===
- January 1 – Azerbaijan accepted status of non-permanent member of the Security Council.

=== March ===
- March 23 - Maine adopted a resolution on Khojaly Massacre.

=== February ===
- February 1 - The Foreign Relations Committee of Senate of Pakistan adopted a resolution on the recognition of Khojaly Massacre
- February 24 - State of Georgia adopted a Resolution 1594 recognizing the 20th anniversary of the Khojaly Massacre

=== April ===
- April 2–4 - The Second Ordinary Session of Euronest Parliamentary Assembly was organized in Baku.

=== May ===
- May 7 - Baku Crystal Hall was opened with the participation of Ilham Aliyev.
- May 9–13 - The first international bicycle tour was organized in memory of Heydar Aliyev.
- May 10 - Heydar Aliyev Center was opened on the 89th birthday anniversary of Heydar Aliyev.
- May 22–26 - Eurovision Song Contest 2012

=== September ===
- September 22-October 13 - 2012 FIFA U-17 Women's World Cup was held in Azerbaijan.

=== December ===
- December 30 - The development concept “Azerbaijan 2020: a look into the future” was adopted by the decree of Ilham Aliyev
