= 2020 in Azerbaijan =

- Decades: 2000s; 2010s; 2020s
- See also: Other events of 2020; Timeline of Azerbaijani history

Events from the year 2020 in Azerbaijan.

== Incumbents ==
- President: Ilham Aliyev
- Vice President: Mehriban Aliyeva
- Prime Minister: Ali Asadov

== Events ==
- February 9 - 2020 Azerbaijani parliamentary election.
- February 28 - 1st case of COVID-19 in Azerbaijan, a Russian national who had traveled to Iran. 2 more cases were later confirmed in the country and they were all isolated. They were Azerbaijani nationals who returned from Iran. On the same day Azerbaijan closed borders with Iran for 2 weeks.
- July 12-15 - Artillery fire was reportedly exchanged with the Armed Forces of Armenia in the Tovuz District.
- September 27-November 10 - The 2020 Nagorno-Karabakh war.
- December 10 - Victory parade was held in Baku.

== Deaths ==
- Polad Hashimov - military officer (b. 1975)

== See also ==
- Azerbaijan at the 2020 Winter Youth Olympics
