= Yadollah Maftun Amini =

Iranian poet (1926–2022)

Yadollah Maftun Amini یدالله مفتون امینی
- Born: 12 June 1926; Shahindezh, West Azerbaijan, Iran
- Died: 1 December 2022 (aged 96); Tehran, Iran
- Years active: 1957–2022

Yadollah Maftun Amini (Persian: یدالله مفتون امینی; 12 June 1926 – 1 December 2022) was an Iranian poet.

== Early life ==
Yadollah Amini, whose literary nickname was Maftun, was born in 1926 in Shahindezh, West Azerbaijan, northwest of Iran. He did his early education up to the end of high school in Tabriz before moving to Tehran. He studied in Tehran University's Faculty of Law.

== Literature works ==
Maftun Amini started with classical-style Persian Poetry, but gradually proceeded to modern and non-rhythmic Persian Poetry in the 1980s. Other than poems in Persian, Maftun wrote poems in his mother tongue, Azerbaijani. Ashiqli Karvan was Maftun's first Azerbaijani poetry collection. A major part of his poems in Persian are lyrics and nostalgia.

== Personal life and death ==
Maftun Amini died on 1 December 2022, at the age of 96.

== Works ==
- Poem collections
  - Ashiqli Karvan (Karavan of Ashiqs (singers)), 1960s, Tabriz
  - Anarestan (Pomegranate Garden), 1967, Tabriz, Ebn-e-sina Publishers
  - Ashiqli Karvan (Camel Train), 1979
  - Nahang ya Mowj (Wale or Tide), Selections of Kulak and Anarestan (1979, Tehran)
  - Fasl-e-Penhan (Hidden Season), Poem selections
  - Man va Khazan-e-toh (Me and Your Fall), 2006, Amrud Publishers
  - Shab-e-hazar-o-doh (Night of One Thousand and Two), (Includes a part in Azeri Turkish),
