= Jamila Hasanzade =

Azerbaijan researcher (1947–2022)

- Cəmilə Həsənzadə
- Born: December 7, 1947; Baku
- Died: August 27, 2022 (aged 74); Baku
- Citizenship: Azerbaijan
- Known for: Mysterious Tales of Tabriz

Jamila Hasanzade (December 7, 1947 – August 27, 2022) was a leading researcher of the Institute of Architecture and Art of the Azerbaijan National Academy of Sciences, doctor of art studies, professor, author of the famous book "Mysterious Tales of Tabriz".

== Life ==
Hasanzade was born in Baku. In 1968, she graduated from the Azerbaijan State Art School, and in 1973, she studied at the Leningrad Academy of Art. She graduated from the Faculty of Arts at Repin Institute. In 1973, she has been a researcher at the Institute of Architecture and Art of the Azerbaijan Academy of Sciences. In 1983, she has been teaching at the graphic arts faculty of the Pedagogical University named after N. Tusi, at the University of Arts and Culture, and at the Art Gymnasium.

In 1976, she was a member of the Union of Artists of the USSR.

In 1983, she defended her candidate's thesis entitled "16th century Tabriz miniature painting in the collections of the USSR", and in 2002, she defended her doctoral dissertation on "Emergence and development of Tabriz miniature school in the late 13th-early 15th centuries".

She knew Azerbaijani, Russian, French, and English languages. She translated the Azerbaijani films Bat and Birthday into French.

== Works ==
=== Books ===
- Müxtəsər incəsənt tarixi (1999)
- "Təbriz məktəbinin XIII əsrin axırı – XV əsrin əvvəllərində yaranması və inkişafı" monoqrafiyası (1999)
- Тебризская школа в контексте мусульманской миниатюрной живописи (XIV – I половина XVI вв.).
- Təbrizin solmaz boyaları: XIV-XVI əsr Azərbaycan miniatür boyakarlıq. Elmi red.: K. C. Kərimov; Rəyçilər: N. İ. Rzayev.- B.: Nafta-Press, 2001.- 195 s.
- Mysterious Tales of Tabriz (2014)

=== Articles ===
- Прошлое и настоящее азербайджанского искусства.
- Джамиля Гасанзаде. Взаимовлияние стилей в тебризской живописи начала XVI века. Журнал "San'at", № 4(2000), Узбекистан.
- Джамиля Гасанзаде. Камалиддин Бехзад и искусство восточной миниатюры. Журнал "San'at", № 4(2000), Узбекистан.
- Джамиля Гасанзаде, Агасалим Эфендиев. Первый памятник азербайджанской миниатюры. Журнал "İRS", № 4(46), 2010.
- Джамиля Гасанзаде, Агасалим Эфендиев. Миниатюры рукописи "Манафи аль-Хайаван" –первый образец тебризского стиля. Журнал "İRS", № 5(47), 2010.
- Джамиля Гасанзаде, Агасалим Эфендиев. Тебризская миниатюра начала XIV века в миниатюрах рукописи Бируни. Журнал "İRS", № 1(49), 2011.
- Джамиля Гасанзаде, Агасалим Эфендиев. Всемирная история в азербайджанской миниатюре. Журнал "İRS", № 2(50), 2011.
- Джамиля Гасанзаде, Агасалим Эфендиев. Большое Тебризское "Шахнаме" и тебризская живопись 1330–40 гг. Журнал "İRS", № 3(51), 2011.
- Джамиля Гасанзаде, Агасалим Эфендиев. Образы святых в миниатюрах "Джами ат-Таварих". Журнал "İRS", № 4(52), 2011.
- Джамиля Гасанзаде, Агасалим Эфендиев. Анималистика в тебризской миниатюре второй половины XIV века. Журнал "İRS", № 5(53), 2011.
- Джамиля Гасанзаде, Агасалим Эфендиев. Традиции эпической иллюстрации тебризской миниатюры во второй половине XIV века. Творчество Шамседдина. Журнал "İRS", № 2(56), 2012.
- Джамиля Гасанзаде, Агасалим Эфендиев. Тема Вознесения. Мифологические образы в тебризской миниатюрной живописи. Журнал "İRS", №3(57), 2012.
- Джамиля Гасанзаде, Агасалим Эфендиев. Расцвет живописи в эпоху правления султана Ахмеда Джелаира. Журнал "İRS", № 4 (58), 2012.
- Джамиля Гасанзаде, Агасалим Эфендиев. Вклад джелаирского цикла "Калилы и Димны" в развитие тебризской миниатюры. Журнал "İRS", №5(59), 2012.
