= Institute of Physics, Azerbaijan National Academy of Sciences =

Research institute in Baku, Azerbaijan

The Institute of Physics of the Azerbaijan National Academy of Sciences is a research institution that is part of the structure of Physical, Mathematical and Technical Sciences Department of the National Academy of Sciences. The director of the institute is academician Nazim Mammadov. The institute is located in Baku city.

== History ==
In 1945, the Institute of Physics and Mathematics was established on the basis of the physics sector of the Azerbaijani branch of the Transcaucasian section of the USSR Academy of Sciences. In 1959, Institute of Physics and Mathematics were reorganized and became 2 independent institutes: Institute of Mathematics and Mechanics and Institute of Physics. The first chairman of the department was academician İ.Q.Yesman. In 1950-1954, the department was headed by academician Y.Mammadaliyev. Between 1954 and 1957, academician M. Naghiyev took this position and served as academician-secretary (it shortly before had replaced "chairman" position). From 1957 to 1993, the director of the Institute of Physics and Mathematics, and then the Institute of Physics, was Academician Hasan Abdullayev.

== Structure ==
The following sectors exist within the structure of Institute; Independent Trade Union, Women Council, Council of Young Scientists and Specialists, Information Sector, Interdisciplinary Sector, Innovation Sector and General Sector.

=== Laboratories included in the General Sector ===
- Laboratory Transport Phenomena in Semiconductors and Semiconductor Nanostructures; Laboratory of nanostructures in semiconductors;
- Laboratory of Resonance Phenomena in Solids;
- Optical and transport properties of diamond like and multinary compounds;
- Vacuum photo electronics laboratory;
- Molecular Spectroscopy;
- Laboratory of Physics of cosmic-ray sources;
- High voltages physics and technology laboratory;
- Laboratory of Solar and hydrogen energy converters;
- Department Cryogenic technology;

=== Laboratories included in the Innovation Sector ===
- Laboratory of Structure and Structural transformations;
- Laboratory of Bio nanostructure Physics;
- Laboratory of the Solid State Theory;
- Nanocrystals Physics Laboratory;
- Laboratory physics of non-crystalline semiconductors;
- Optoelectronics laboratory;
- Laboratory of thin film structures;
- Laboratory Infrared photoelectronics and plasma phenomena;
- Laboratory of photoelectric and optical diagnostics of semiconductor structures;
- Laboratory of Spectroscopic Ellipsometry;
- Nuclear Research Laboratory;
- Laboratory of High energy physics;
- Laboratory of Chaos in Dynamical Systems ;
- Laboratory of Materials;
- Laboratory of Quantum Information Science;
- Applied Physics Laboratory;
- Crystallography Laboratory;

=== Laboratories included in the Interdisciplinary Sector ===
- Narrow-zonal Semiconductors and High-temperature Superconductors;
- Laboratory Physics of Non-equilibrium Electron Processes in Semiconductors;
- Laboratory of Solid State Electronics;
- Laboratory of epitaxial layers and structures;
- Laboratory of Crystal Physics;
- Acousto-optic laboratory;
- Physics of polymer nano- and active composites;
- Laboratory of Specialized Non-standard Control and Diagnostics Systems;
- Laboratory of Heterostructures Physics;

=== Laboratories included in Information Sector ===
- Department Receiving of information, storage and development of intelligent system;
- Institute of Information Technology;
- Department of Scientific – Technical Information and Patent Investigations;
- Department of Encyclopedia and Terminology;
