= Nazim Aliverdibeyov =

- Nazim Əliverdibəyov
- Born: 24 August 1926; Baku, Baku uezd, Azerbaijan SSR, Transcaucasian Socialist Federative Soviet Republic, Soviet Union
- Died: 16 February 1986 (aged 59); Baku, Azerbaijan SSR, Soviet Union
- Occupation: Composer
- Father: Aghalar bey Aliverdibeyov
- Awards: Medal "For Distinguished Labor" — 1959

Nazim Aghalar oghlu Aliverdibeyov (August 24, 1926, Baku – February 16, 1986, Baku) was an Azerbaijani composer. He was the composer of the music for many famous Azerbaijani films.

== Life ==
Nazim Aliverdibeyov was born in 1926. He was a composer, as well as a film composer and music editor. He graduated from the Azerbaijan State Conservatory. From 1951 to 1985, he taught at the Bulbul Specialized Secondary School and the Azerbaijan State Conservatory. From 1964 to 1985, he served as the director of the Bulbul Specialized Secondary School. He re-orchestrated Uzeyir Hajibeyov's operas “Asli and Kerem” and “Leyli and Majnun”. He was also the editor of the published scores of Uzeyir Hajibeyov's operas “Leyli and Majnun” (1983) and “Koroghlu” (1985).

The composer was the cousin of Uzeyir Hajibeyov. He was the son of musicologist Aghalar Aliverdibeyov. He was the brother of violinist Rasim Aliverdibeyov, conductor Kazim Aliverdibeyov, and pianist Nushaba Aliverdibeyova.

Nazim Aliverdibeyov died on February 16, 1986, in Baku.

== Works ==
Ballet

- Mugham (1972)

Instrumental

- “Bayatı Shiraz” for organ

- “Scenes of Icherisheher” for organ

- Elegy composed for canon

Vocal-Instrumental Works

- Babek Niftaliyev — Folk song “Aman Ovchu ” based on Bayatı-Shiraz Mugham, composed for choir

- Firudin Mehdiyev — Romance "Ey Gulum" — lyrics by Imadaddin Nasimi

Opera

- Jirtdan (1978)

Musical Comedy

- "Nazkhanim Naz Eleyir" (1974) — co-authored with Maharram Alizadeh

== Awards ==
Medal "For Distinguished Labour" - 9 June 1959

== Filmography ==
- The Boys of Our Street (1973)

- Following the Caravan Leaders (1974)

- The Cherry Tree (1972)

- The Crown of the Lakes (1966)

- My Caspian (1970)

- The Astrologer's Apprentice (1983)

- The Life of Uzeyir (1981)

- Towards the Volcano (1977)

- We Finished Well (1985)
