= World forum on Intercultural dialogue (Azerbaijan) =

Dialogue Forum

The World forum on Intercultural dialogue is an international forum held in the Republic of Azerbaijan since 2011 to establish an effective and efficient dialogue between cultures and civilizations. Based on the Baku process and related declaration in 2008.

== Baku Declaration ==
10 Islamic countries were invited by Azerbaijan to the conference of culture ministers of the Council of Europe member states held on December 2–3, 2008. "Baku Declaration on the Promotion of Intercultural Dialogue" was adopted at this conference, where high-level representatives from 48 countries, 8 international organizations and several international non-governmental organizations from Europe and neighboring regions participated in the conference. "Baku Process", promotes dialogue between civilizations and the "Artists for Dialogue" project.

== World forums on Intercultural dialogue ==
=== First Forum ===
On April 7–9, 2011, the 1st World Forum on Intercultural Dialogue was held in Baku with the support of UNESCO, UN Alliance of Civilizations, Council of Europe and ISESCO and participation of official representatives from 102 countries.

=== Second forum ===
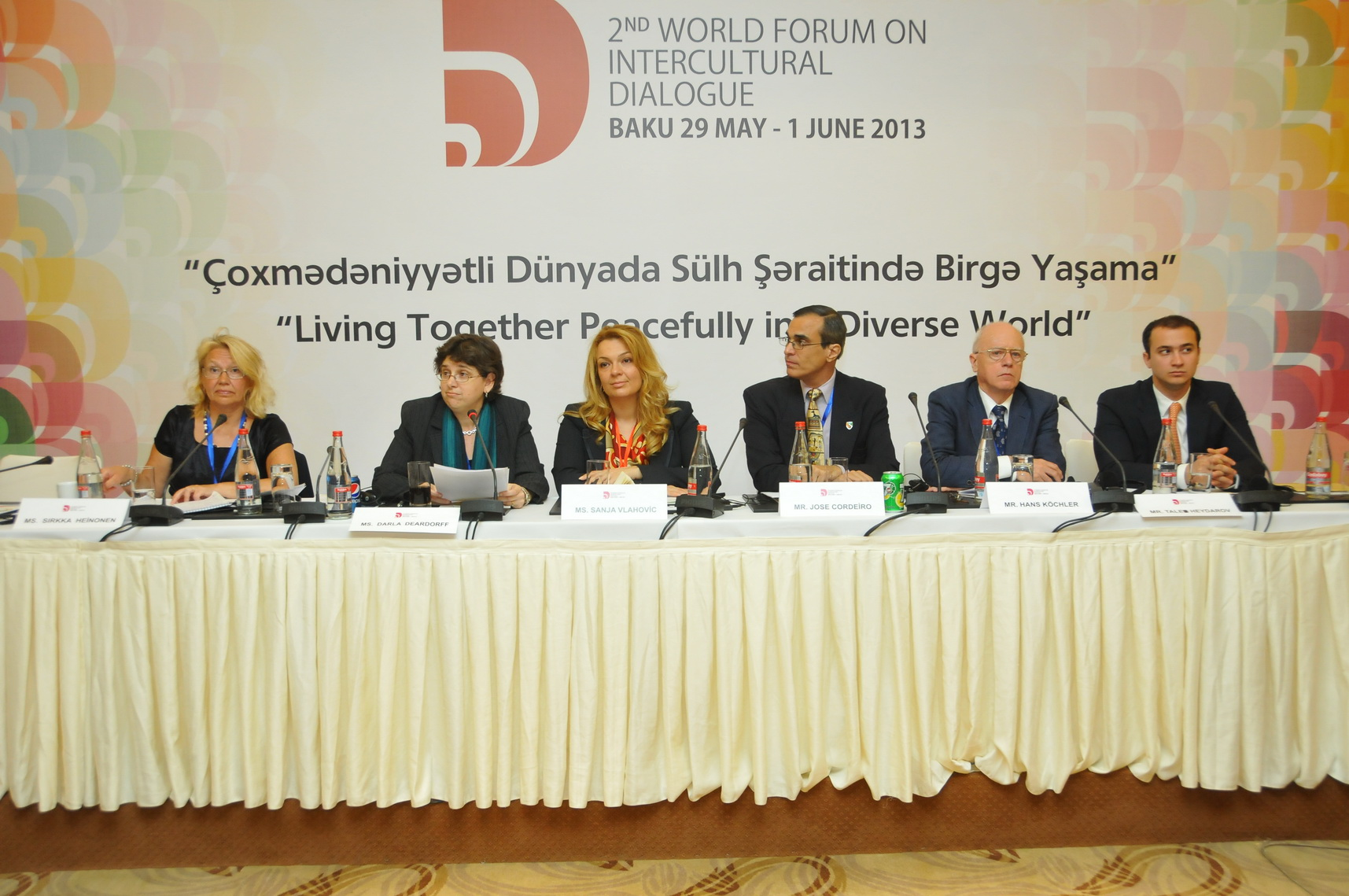
II World Forum on Intercultural Dialogue.

The Second World Forum on Intercultural Dialogue was held in Baku on 29 May - 1 June 2013 under the slogan "Living together in a multicultural world". UNESCO, UN Alliance of Civilizations, Council of Europe and ISESCO, as well as the UN World Tourism Organization, were the main partners in the organizing of the forum.

=== Third Forum ===
The 3rd World Forum on Intercultural Dialogue was organized under the slogan of “sharing culture for shared safety” with the partnerships of UNESCO, the UN Alliance of Civilizations, UN World Tourism Organization, the Council of Europe and UNESCO in Baku on May 18–19, 2015.

==== The opening ceremony of “Peace Tree” ====
The Peace Tree monument was built near the National Flag Square, in the territory of new boulevard. The opening ceremony of The Peace Tree was held On May 17, 2015. The monument was opened by the First Lady of Azerbaijan, Director-General of UNESCO Irina Bokova and the author of The Peace Tree Hedva Ser. The creator of The Peace Tree is Hedva Ser UNESCO “Artist for Peace”.

=== Fourth Forum ===
The 4th World Forum on Intercultural Dialogue was held on May 5–6, 2017 in Baku under the motto “Advancing Intercultural Dialogue: New Avenues for Human Security, Peace and Sustainable Development”. The Forum was co-organized by UNESCO, UN Alliance of Civilizations, UN World Tourism Organization, Council of Europe, ISESCO, and North-South Center of the Council of Europe. Nearly 120 officials from foreign countries, representatives of 39 international organizations and more than 50 non-governmental organizations participated.

=== V World Forum on Intercultural Dialogue ===
V World Forum on Intercultural Dialogue took place on May 2–3, 2019 in Baku, Azerbaijan. The forum was organized by the Government of Azerbaijan together with UNESCO, UNAOC, UNWTO, the Council of Europe and ISESCO under the motto of “Building dialogue into action against discrimination, inequality, and violent conflict” with participants from 100 countries and 30 international organizations. Azerbaijani, English, French, and Russian were the most used languages during the event. The event has been broadcast by the UN on its official website.

== Criticism ==
During the inaugural 2011 World forum on Intercultural dialogue, Azerbaijani president Ilham Aliyev praised Azerbaijan as a beacon of tolerance and guaranteed the international audience that "everyone lives like one family in Azerbaijan. No national or religious confrontations or misunderstandings have existed here". The modern historian Krista A. Goff explains that although there is a domestic audience for such statements within Azerbaijan, the Azerbaijani leadership also uses events such as the World forum on Intercultural dialogue as part of their persistent attempts to bolster Azerbaijan's global prestige and economic standing, while simultaneously trying to nullify and reject any international criticism regarding its appalling human rights record, political repression and endemic corruption. Azerbaijan, as per Aliyev's office, yearns to be viewed "in the world as the center of multiculturalism". Goff explains that Azerbaijan's leadership tries to reach these goals through strategic public relations which, amongst others, includes the hosting and funding of concerts, conferences, sponsored trips and publications.
