= Arif Maharramov =

- Born: Arif Ali oglu Maharramov; August 5, 1948; Azerbaijan SSR, Soviet Union
- Died: August 9, 2022 (aged 74); Azerbaijan
- Education: Sergei Gerasimov All-Russian State Institute of Cinematography; * Azim Azimzade Azerbaijan State Art School
- Known for: Actor, film director
- Style: Cinematic art, painting
- Awards: Honored Artist of Azerbaijan (2000)

Arif Ali oglu Maharramov (August 5, 1948 – August 9, 2022) — Azerbaijani film artist, Honored Artist of the Republic of Azerbaijan (2000). He is widely recognized as the first animator-director in Azerbaijan to produce 3D animated films.

== Life ==
Arif Ali oglu Maharramov was born on August 5, 1948. He graduated from the Azerbaijan State Art School named after Azim Azimzade in 1972 and from the Faculty of Art at the All-Union State Institute of Cinematography in Moscow in 1981. From that year, he worked at the "Azerbaijanfilm" studio as a production designer in several feature films, as well as a designer and director in animated films. His paintings have been exhibited both in Azerbaijan and abroad. He was a member of the Artists' Union of Azerbaijan and Latvia.

He is also renowned as the first animator-director in Azerbaijan to produce 3D animated films. The animated films he directed represented Azerbaijan at film festivals held in Turkey and Sweden. One of Arif Maharramov's recent achievements in this field was the 2018 animated film My Little Prince, created using modern technology. Based on Antoine de Saint-Exupéry's famous work, the film was produced at the Azanfilm Animation Studio. In 2020, it won the "Bright Future" award at a film festival held in South Korea, earning first prize.

In recognition of his contributions to the development of Azerbaijani cinema, he was awarded the honorary title of Honored Artist of Azerbaijan on December 18, 2000.

== Filmography ==
- We Will Return (2007)
- Kosa Has Arrived (1988)
- Business Trip (1982)
- Kitabi Dede Gorgud: Basat and Tepegoz (2003)
- Kitabi Dede Gorgud: The Story of Sekray (1990)
- Nasreddin Hodja
- The Apprentice of the Astrologer (1983)
- Greetings from the Other World (1991)
- The Fortress (2008)
- Qaravalli (1989)
- Qaravalli-2 (1992)
- Chrysanthemum Leaf (1989)
- Time to Sleep (1984)
- Seven Beauties (1982)
