= World Economic Forum in Baku =

2013 event in Azerbaijan

World Economic Forum in Baku – was held in Baku (Azerbaijan) on April 7–8, 2013. “Strategic dialogue on the future of the South Caucasus and Central Asia” was the theme of the forum. More than 200 representatives of business sphere, administration and civil organizations took part at the forum.

== Selection of the venue ==
General agreement about holding of the World Economic Forum in Baku was signed on January 23, 2013, in Swiss Davos, during the meeting of Ilham Aliyev, the President of Azerbaijani Republic and Klaus Schwab, executive chairman of the World Economic Forum.

== Aims and targets ==
Discussion of issues on development of industrial, mineral resources, transportation, infrastructure, agriculture, finance, telecommunication and other sectors was the main goal of the World Economic Forum held in Baku, the main theme of which was “Strategic dialogue on the future of the South Caucasus and Central Asia”.

Forum will be an evaluation platform of main problems and opportunities related to the future of the region and also will contribute to development of cooperation and integration in the South Caucasus and Central Asia.

== Program of the forum ==
Program of the World Economic Forum in Baku consisted of 6 sessions:

- Opening session
- Session on the theme of: “Energy and mineral resources: opportunities and challenges, moving ahead”
- Session on the theme of: “Entrepreneurship and human capital”
- Session on the theme of: “Finance and long-term investing”
- Session on the theme of: “Trade and delivery chain”
- Session on the theme of: “Vision of Azerbaijan: Towards the new economy”

== Activity of the forum ==
=== Voting ===
A voting-survey about the future of the South Caucasus and Central Asia was carried out during the forum. According to the results, 62,3% of participants voted for integration of regions, 22% for fragmentation and 15,7% for polarization.

=== Seminar ===
On April 7, 2013, the first day of the forum, a seminar called “Media and communication with public for a global youth project” was held. Paulette Hebert – representative of “Around the Rings” sport portal in the Near East and Ed Hula – editor and founder of “Around the Rings” spoke in the seminar.

== Participants ==
- Ilham Aliyev – President of Azerbaijan
- Taner Yıldız – Minister of Energy and Natural Resources of Turkey
- Algirdas Butkevičius – Prime Minister of Lithuania
- Sali Berisha – Prime Minister of Albania
- Prince Andrew, Duke of York
- Gordan Jandroković – Minister of Foreign Affairs and European Integration of Croatia
- Giorgi Kvirikashvili – Minister of Economy and Sustainable Development of Georgia
- Davit Narmania – Minister of Regional Development and Infrastructure of Georgia
- Luvsanvandan Bold – Minister of Foreign Affairs of Mongolia
- Bakhytjan Sagintayev – Deputy Prime Minister of Kazakhstan
- Djoomart Otorbaev – First Deputy Prime Minister of Kyrgyzstan
- Andrey Kostin – chairman and executive director of VTB bank of Russia
- Frederick Star – Chairman of “Central Asia and Caucasus Institution” of Johns Hopkins University
- Victor Halberstadt – Professor of Leiden University of Netherlands
- Gordon Birell – regional president of BP in Azerbaijan, Georgia and Turkey
- J. Carl Ganter – managing director, Circle of Blue
- Peter Sannikov – vice-president of the Russian Direct Investment Fund
