= Daşbaşı, Khojaly =

Daşbaşı
- Location within Azerbaijan
- Country: Azerbaijan
- District: Khojaly
- Time zone: UTC+4 (AZT)

Daşbaşı (Dashbashy) is a village in the Khojaly District of Azerbaijan. It was under the de facto control of breakaway Republic of Artsakh until the Azerbaijani takeover of the region in 2023.
