= Shgharshik, Syunik =

Shgharshik Շղարշիկ
- Location within Armenia Location within Syunik Province
- Coordinates: 39°13′35″N 46°20′10″E
- Country: Armenia
- Province: Syunik

Population (2018)
  - Total: 200
- Time zone: UTC+4 (AMT)

Shgharshik (Armenian: Շղարշիկ) is a village in the Syunik Province of Armenia, located on the outskirts of Kapan.
