= Ogtay Asadov =

Azerbaijani politician

- Oqtay Əsədov
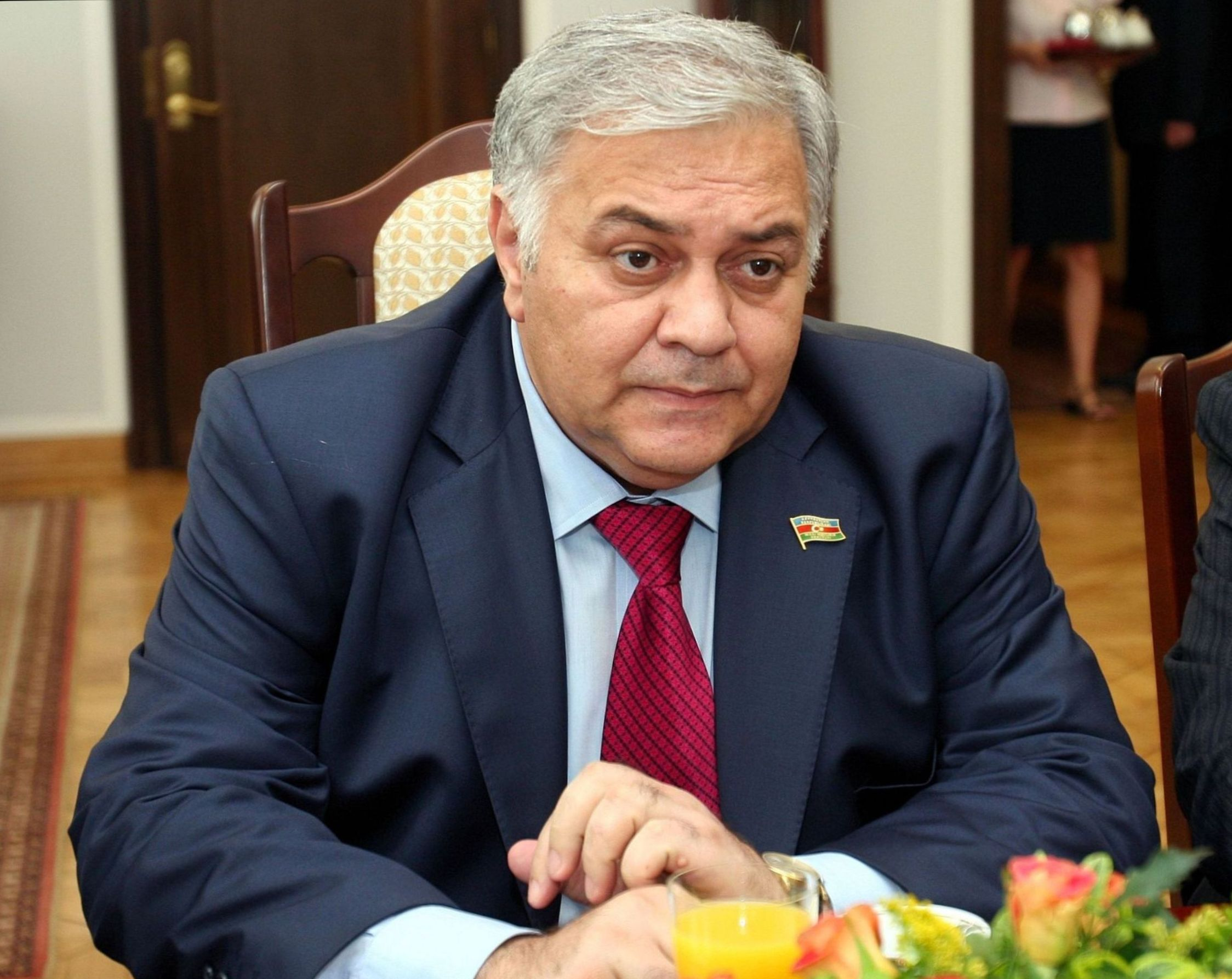
- Asadov in 2007

Speaker of the National Assembly
- In office 2 December 2005 – 10 March 2020
- President: Ilham Aliyev
- Preceded by: Murtuz Alasgarov
- Succeeded by: Sahiba Gafarova

Personal details
- Born: 3 January 1955 (age 71) Shaharjik, Syunik, Armenian SSR, Soviet Union
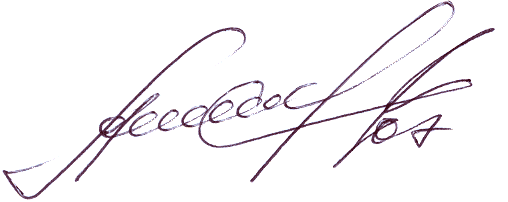
- Signature

Ogtay Sabir oglu Asadov (Azerbaijani: Oqtay Sabir oğlu Əsədov; born 3 January 1955) is a Azerbaijani politician who served as the Speaker of the National Assembly of Azerbaijan between 2005 and 2020.

== Early life ==
Asadov was born in the village of Shaharjik in Syunik Province in Armenia. He graduated from the Machinery Manufacturing Technologies Department of the Azerbaijan State Oil Academy. From 1976 on, Asadov worked as the assistant manager and then the manager at the Baku Air Conditioners Plant. In 1979, he was hired as the Senior Engineer at Azerbaijan Main Renovation and Special Construction Department and then worked in the management of Azərsantexquraşdırma, a subsidiary of the same organization. In 1996–2004, he was the President of the Absheron Su water management company and, in 2004–2005, he was the President of Azersu. He is a member of the International Water Association.

== Political career ==
He was elected to the National Assembly of Azerbaijan in the 2000 parliamentary elections and re-elected in 2005 from Absheron Rayon and 2010 from the Binagadi district of Baku. On December 2, 2005, he was elected the Speaker of the National Assembly by the members of parliament and re-elected on November 29, 2010. He is the head of the Azerbaijani delegation to the Inter-Parliamentary Assembly of CIS and to the Parliamentary Assembly of Turkic-speaking Countries (TÜRKPA).

He is also a member of the Political Council of the New Azerbaijan Party. He was granted the Medal of Honor by the respective decree of President Ilham Aliyev in 2014.

=== Wealth ===
During his 14 years in parliament, Asadov earned an annual salary under $30,000 and was not allowed to work in the private sector. The Pandora Papers leaks revealed that Asadov and his family acquired assets worth nearly $10 million in London, Dubai, and Moscow, which raised questions as to the sources of Asadov's finances.

== Personal life ==
Asadov is fluent in English and Russian. He is married and has two children.

== See also ==
- Cabinet of Azerbaijan
- Government of Azerbaijan
