= Speaker of the National Assembly of Azerbaijan =

Speaker of the National Assembly
- Coat of Arms of Azerbaijan

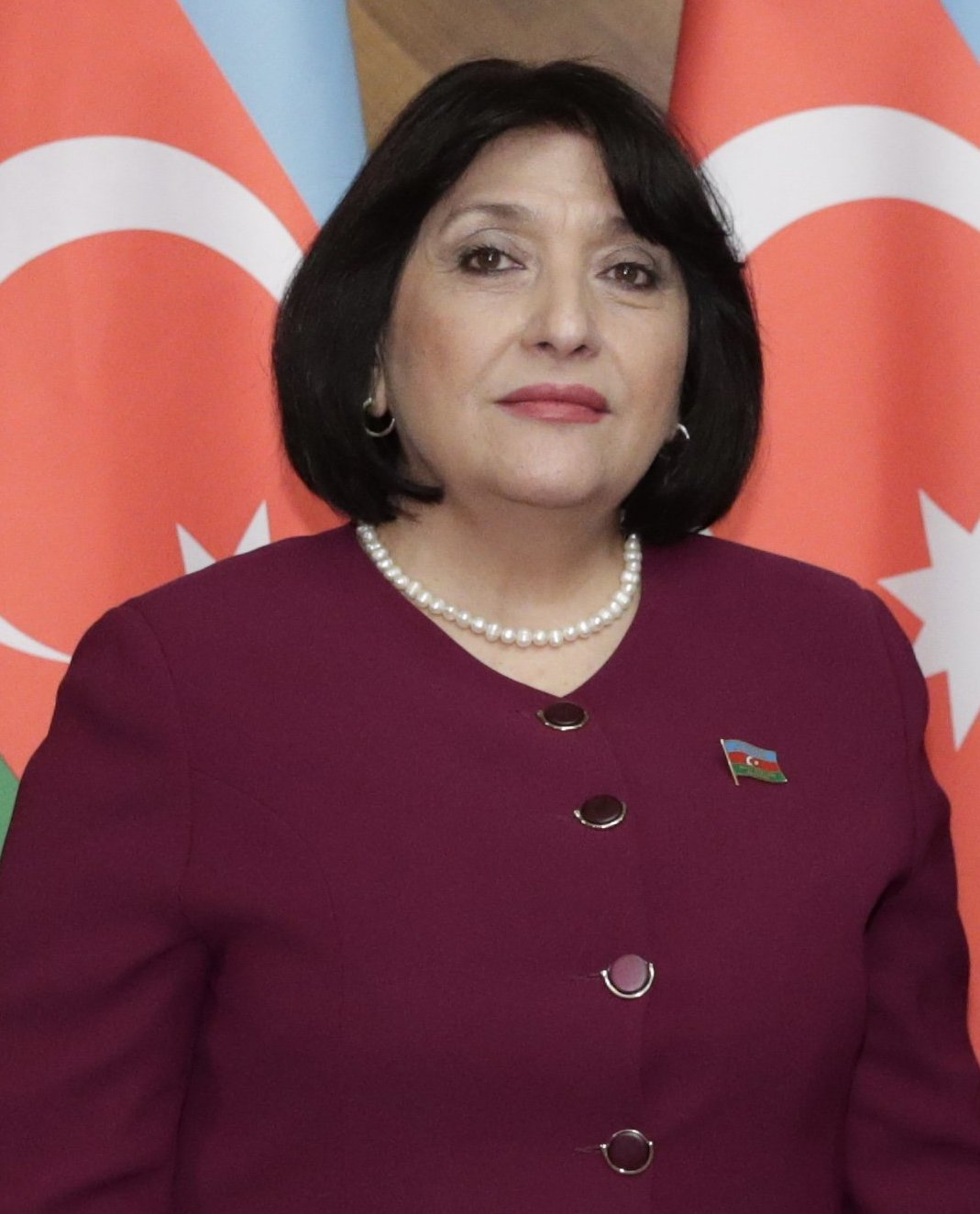
- Incumbent; Sahiba Gafarova since 10 March 2020
- Appointer: Elected by the Members of Azerbaijani Parliament
- Inaugural holder: Mahammad Amin Rasulzade; 27 May 1918
- Formation: Constitution of Azerbaijan; 12 November 1995
- Succession: Fourth, after the First Vice President, Vice Presidents (currently vacant) and the Prime Minister
- Deputy: First Deputy Chair, Deputy Chair
- Salary: 2,250 AZN per month
- Website: www.meclis.gov.az

The Speaker of the National Assembly of Azerbaijan Republic (Azerbaijani: Azərbaycan Respublikası Milli Məclisinin spikeri), officially Chairman of the Milli Majlis (Azerbaijani: Milli Məclisin sədri) is the Speaker of the Azerbaijani Parliament. The current speaker is Sahiba Gafarova. According to the amendments to the Azerbaijani Constitution of 1995 and 2016, the Speaker is the fourth in line of succession to presidency after First Vice President of Azerbaijan, Vice Presidents of Azerbaijan (currently vacant), and Prime Minister of Azerbaijan, in that sequence.

== Chairmen of the National Assembly of Azerbaijan ==
Name	Period
Mammad Emin Rasulzade	May 27, 1918 – December 7, 1918
Alimardan Topchubashov	December 7, 1918 – April 27, 1920
Hasan bey Aghayev (First Deputy Chairman)	December 7, 1918 – February 2, 1920
Mammad Yusif Jafarov (First Deputy Chairman)	February 2, 1920 – April 27, 1920
Mir Teymur Yagubov	July 18, 1938 – July 4, 1941
Aziz Aliyev	July 4, 1941 – March 6, 1947
Sultan Gafarzade	March 6, 1947 – March 22, 1947
Yusif Yusifov	March 23, 1947 – March 25, 1951
Aghamirza Ahmadov	March 25, 1951 – April 18, 1953
Mustafa Topchubashov	April 18, 1953 – March 25, 1955
Abdulla Bayramov	March 25, 1955 – January 23, 1958
Mirza Ibrahimov	January 23, 1958 – March 25, 1959
Gazanfar Jafarli	March 25, 1959 – November 25, 1959
Ali Taghizade	November 25, 1959 – March 29, 1963
Mammad Dadashzade	March 29, 1963 – May 4, 1967
Mustafa Topchubashov	May 4, 1967 – July 1, 1971
Suleyman Rustamzade	July 1, 1971 – June 10, 1989
Elmira Gafarova	May 18, 1990 – March 5, 1992
Yagub Mammadov	March 5, 1992 – May 18, 1992
Isa Gambar	May 18, 1992 – June 13, 1993
Heydar Aliyev	June 24, 1993 – November 5, 1993
Rasul Guliyev	November 5, 1993 – September 11, 1996
Murtuz Alasgarov	October 16, 1996 – December 2, 2005
Ogtay Asadov	December 2, 2005 – March 10, 2020
Sahiba Gafarova	March 10, 2020–

== See also ==
- National Assembly of Azerbaijan
- Parliament of the Azerbaijan Democratic Republic
- Supreme Soviet of Azerbaijan
- Chairperson of the Presidium of the Supreme Soviet of the Azerbaijan Soviet Socialist Republic
