= Hundred Thousand Martyrs of Tbilisi =

1226 massacre in Georgia

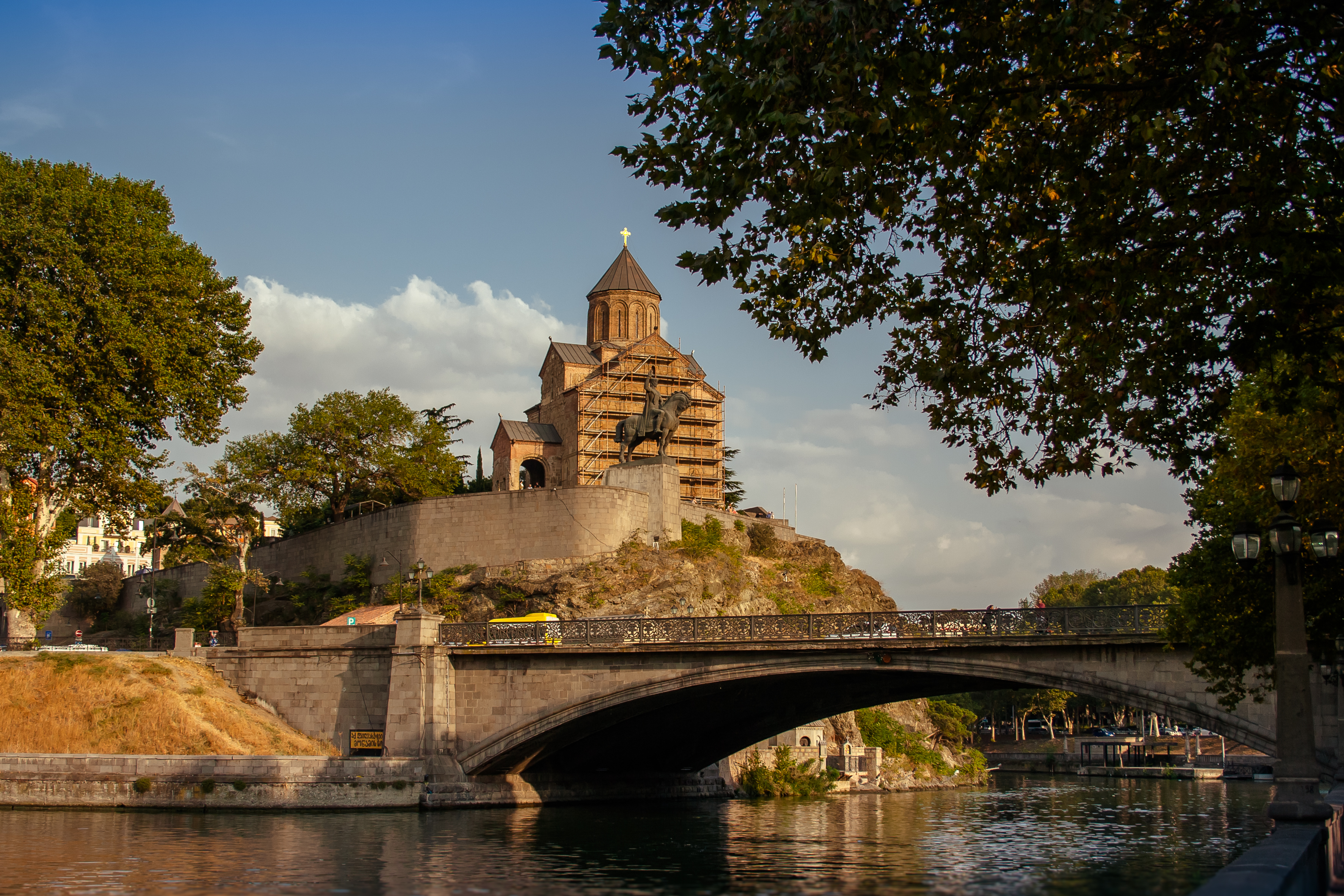
- The Metekhi Bridge in Old Tbilisi, traditionally considered to have been the site of killings of Christians in 1226. The Metekhi Church is seen on the left.
- Died: 9 March 1226; Tbilisi
- Venerated in: Eastern Orthodox Church
- Feast: October 31

The Hundred Thousand Martyrs (Georgian: ასი ათასი მოწამე, romanized: asi atasi mots'ame; originally, ათნი ბევრნი მოწამენი, at'ni bevrni mots'ameni) are saints of the Georgian Orthodox Church, who were put to death, according to the 14th-century anonymous Georgian Chronicle of a Hundred Years, for not renouncing Christianity by the Khwarazmian sultan Jalal al-Din upon his capture of the Georgian capital of Tbilisi in 1226. The source claims the number of those killed were 100,000. The Georgian church commemorates them on 13 November (O.S. 31 October).

== History ==
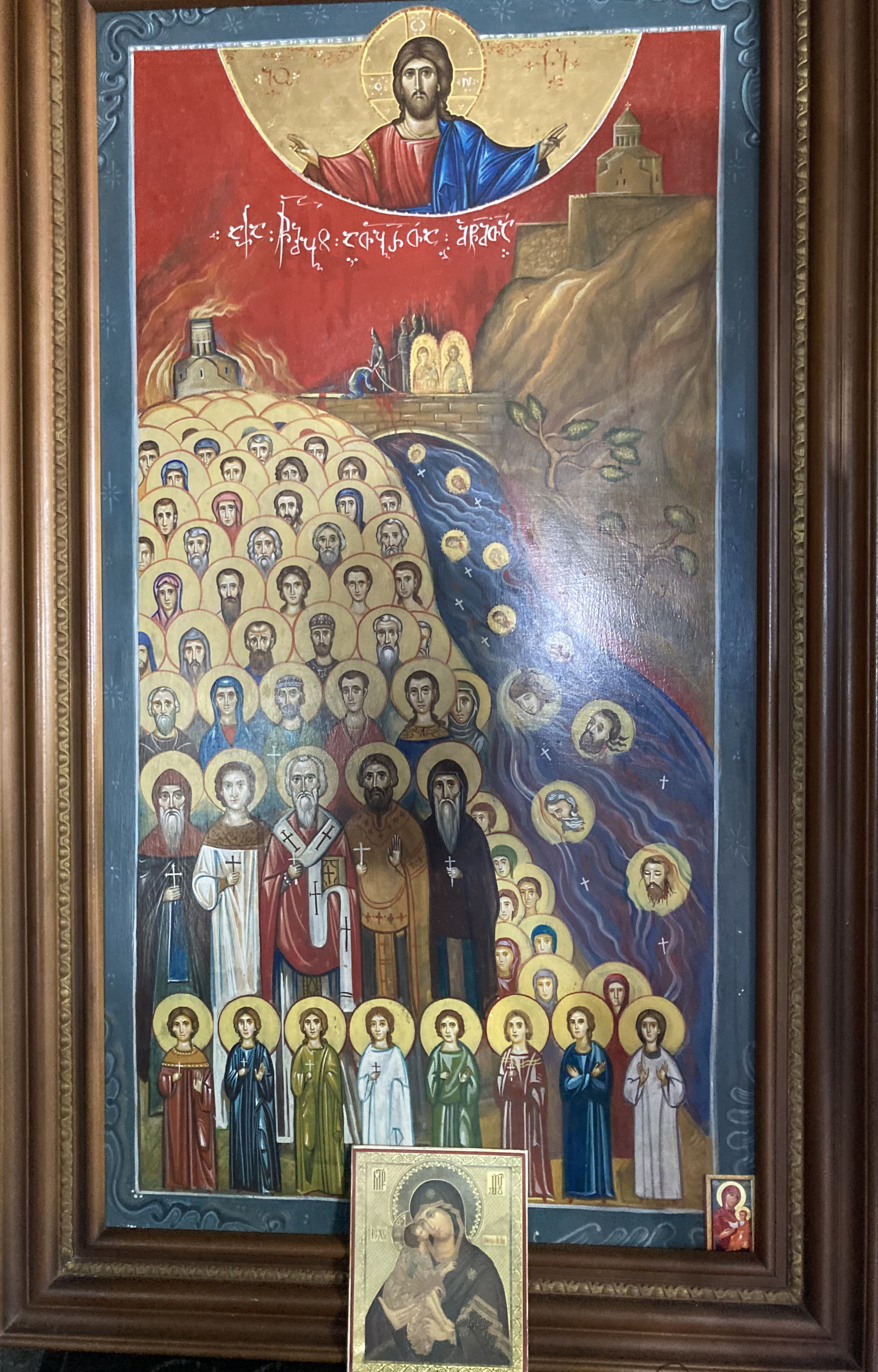
Icon of the Hundred Thousand Martyrs of Tbilisi

Jalal al-Din's first encounter with the Kingdom of Georgia occurred in 1225, when his army inflicted a crushing defeat on the Georgians at the Battle of Garni, bringing about the end of Georgia's medieval heyday. Next year, Jalal al-Din marched on to Tbilisi, forcing Queen Rusudan of Georgia and her court into fight. The Georgian forces, left in defense of the capital, put up a fierce resistance, but Jalal's forces eventually broke into the city with the assistance of local Muslims on 9 March 1226. The victorious Khwarazmian soldiers sacked Tbilisi and massacred its Christian population. The anonymous 14th-century Georgian chronicle, conventionally known as the Chronicle of a Hundred Years, laments: "Words are powerless to convey the destruction that the enemy brought: tearing infants from their mothers' breasts, they beat their heads against the bridge, watching as their eyes dropped from their skulls...". The Muslim historians Ibn al-Athir and Nasawi, the latter being Jalal's secretary and biographer, confirm the killings of Christians who did not accept Islam at the sultan's order.

According to the Georgian source, Jalal had the dome of the Sioni Cathedral torn down and replaced it with a throne for himself. At his order the icons of Christ and Virgin Mary were carried out of the cathedral and placed at the bridge over the Mtkvari river in order to force the Christians to step on them. Those who refused to profane the icons and apostatize to Islam were beheaded. Kirakos Gandzaketsi, an Armenian historian from 13th century, also narrated that Jalal al-Din and his soldiers forced Georgians to convert, mistreated women, destroyed churches and removed the signs of cross.

The medieval Georgian chronicler puts the number of those killed at ათნი ბევრნი (at'ni bevrni). The first part of this numeral, at'ni, denotes "ten". The second part, bevrni, in modern Georgian means "much, many", but it also has now-obsolete meaning of "ten thousand", ultimately derived from Old Persian *baiwar/n for "ten thousand".
