= Mahammad Maharramov =

Azerbaijani politician and statesman

- Məhəmməd Hacı Bayram oğlu Məhərrəmov
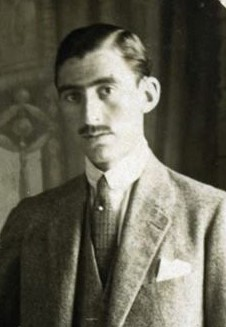

Member of the Parliament of the Azerbaijan Democratic Republic
- In office December 7, 1918 – May 18, 1919

Member of the National Council of the Azerbaijan Democratic Republic
- In office May 27, 1918 – December 7, 1918

Personal details
- Born: Mahammad Maharramov; 1895; Gamarli, Etchmiadzin uezd, Erivan Governorate, Russian Empire
- Died: 1982; Paris, Île-de-France, France
- Political party: Muslim Social Democratic Party
- Education: Erivan Gymnasium

Mahammad Haji Bayram oglu Maharramov (1895, Gamarli, Etchmiadzin uezd, Erivan Governorate, Russian Empire - 1982, Paris, Île-de-France, France) was a member of the Parliament of the Azerbaijan Democratic Republic, elected representative from Erivan Governorate to the Constituent Assembly of Russia. He was the advisor of the delegation to Paris and a member and secretary of the Socialist faction.

After the April invasion, he stayed in Paris, participated in the Prometheus movement, became a member of the Azerbaijan National Center and the treasurer of this institution.

== Early life and education ==
Mahammad Maharramov was born in 1895 in Metsamor village of Erivan governorate in the family of merchant Haji Bayram and Mrs. Ruhiya. He graduated from the Erivan Gymnasium in 1914, and was recognized as one of the representatives of Yerevan Azerbaijanis from a young age. He studied at the medical faculty of St. Petersburg Imperial University. Later, he continued his studies at Moscow State University.

== Activity ==
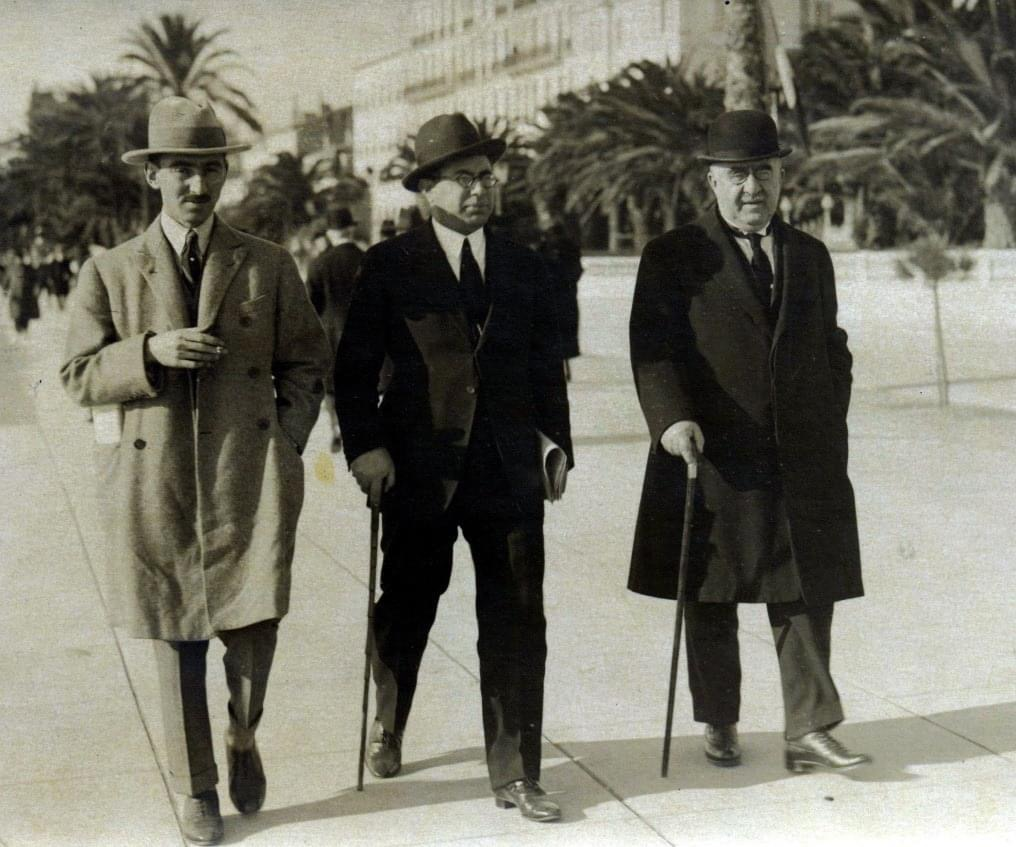
Mahammad Maharramov, Miryagub Mehdiyev and Alimardan bey Topchubashov, Genoa, Italy 1922.

After the February revolution in 1917, he came to Tiflis, where he joined the "Hummet" social-democratic organization. In November 1917, he was elected a representative from the Iravan governorate to the Constituent Assembly of Russia. He was elected to the Transcaucasia Seim from the Muslim socialist bloc. On May 26, 1918, after the fall of the Transcaucasia Democratic Federal Republic, he became a member of the Azerbaijan National Council. He is one of the 24-year-old Council members who signed the Declaration of Independence on May 28, 1918. He represented the socialist faction in the Parliament of Azerbaijan and was its secretary.

According to the law issued by the National Council on November 19, 1918 on the establishment of the "Azerbaijan Majlis-Mabusana", it was included in the composition of the Parliament of Azerbaijan without elections. On December 28, 1918, at the joint meeting of the Government of Azerbaijan with the Council of Elders of the Parliament, he was appointed as an adviser to the Azerbaijani delegation that will participate in the Paris Peace Conference. While in Paris, a note of protest against Denikin's occupation of the territory of the North Caucasus Republic and threat to the republics of Azerbaijan and Georgia was prepared at the initiative of Albert Tom, a social democrat and the chairman of the "Society for the Protection of the Rights of Former Russian Nations". This protest the note is signed by Akbar agha Sheykhulislamov and Mahammad Maharramov, members of the Azerbaijan delegation.

== Later years ==
He lived in Paris after the April 1920 invasion. He closely participated in the work of the delegations of the Caucasian peoples operating in Paris. He was one of the activists of the Prometheus movement. He received a higher education in the field of economics at the Sorbonne. He worked in the bank since 1927. In 1929-1939, he worked as a member of the Azerbaijan National Center and as its treasurer. Later, he opened a second-hand shop for French literature of the 18th and 19th centuries. He accepted French citizenship in 1948. In the 1960s, he donated a rare set of Herzen's "Kolokol" magazine published in London and a rare anthology of the same author published in Switzerland to the former Lenin library in Moscow, and therefore was awarded a special prize of the "Druzhba" society. He visited Baku in 1972 and 1975 and donated valuable materials related to Azerbaijani culture to museums and libraries of the city. According to Ramiz Abutalibov, Mahammad Maharramov died in Paris in 1982 at the age of 87.

== Legacy ==
In 2016, the film "Eternal Mission" about the Azerbaijani delegation that left for the Paris Peace Conference also featured Muhammad Maharramov. Director Tahir Aliyev played his role in the film.

== See also ==
- Jeyhun Hajibeyli
