= Mollakənd =

Mollakənd or Mollakend or Mollakent may refer to:

- Mollakənd, Kurdamir, Azerbaijan
- Mollakənd, Lankaran, Azerbaijan
