= Aghamirza Ahmadov =

Soviet Azerbaijani bureaucrat (1905–1964)

- Ağamirzə Əhmədov; Ағамирзә Әһмәдов

Chairman of the Supreme Soviet of the Azerbaijan SSR
- In office 26 March 1951 – 18 April 1953
- Preceded by: Yusif Yusifov
- Succeeded by: Mustafa Topchubashov

Minister of Trade of the Azerbaijan SSR
- In office 21 January 1959 – 12 August 1963
- Preceded by: Nadir Akhundov
- Succeeded by: Agharza Gafarov

Chairman of the Executive Committee of the Baku City Council of Labor Deputies
- In office 1956 – January 1959
- Succeeded by: Alish Lambaranski

Second Secretary of the Nakhchivan Regional Committee of the Communist Party of the Azerbaijan
- In office 1943–1944
- Succeeded by: Shirali Mammadov

Personal details
- Born: 1905 Angekharan, Baku Governorate, Caucasus Viceroyalty
- Died: 12 May 1964 (aged 58–59) Baku, Azerbaijan SSR, Soviet Union
- Resting place: Alley of Honor, Baku
- Party: Communist Party of the Soviet Union
- Awards: Order of the Red Banner of Labour Order of the Badge of Honour

Aghamirza Mirzali oghlu Ahmadov (Azerbaijani: Ağamirzə Mirzəli oğlu Əhmədov, 1905—12 May 1964) was a Soviet Azerbaijani bureaucrat who was Chairman of the Supreme Soviet of the Azerbaijan SSR from 1951 to 1953. He was also the Minister of Trade of the Azerbaijan SSR.

== Biography ==
Aghamirza Ahmadov was born in 1905 in the village of Angekharan in the present-day Shamakhi District. When the Soviet government was established in Azerbaijan, Ahmadov joined the Komsomol, and then was sent to study at the Soviet Party School in Baku. While studying here, he was elected a member of the All-Union Communist Party (Bolshevik) in 1928. After graduating from school, he was sent to senior positions in the regions of Azerbaijan, worked as secretary of the Komsomol Committee of the Baskal region, head of the education department of the Shamakhi District, head of the organizational department of the regional party committee.

Ahmadov studied at the Institute of Marxism-Leninism in Baku in 1932–1934, then worked as deputy head of the political department at Mollakend MTS in Kurdamir District, secretary of regional party committees in Lankaran, Zangilan and Shamkhor Districts. After five years of party activity, he was again sent to study at the Higher Party School under the Central Committee of the All-Union Communist (Bolshevik) Party in 1939. After returning from Moscow, he began to work in leading positions in party organizations in Azerbaijan in 1941. He was secretary of the Ali Bayramli district party committee, deputy head of the Transcaucasian Railways political department, second secretary of the Nakhchivan Regional Committee of the Communist Party of the Azerbaijan, head of the transport department of the Baku city party committee, secretary of the party committees of Guba District, Kirovabad and Baku.

From 1951 to 1953 Ahmadov was elected chairman of the Supreme Soviet of the Azerbaijan SSR and in 1952 was appointed deputy chairman of the Baku regional party committee. After the abolition of the region, he worked in the office of the Council of Ministers of the Azerbaijan SSR. From the beginning of 1954, he was the Deputy Chairman and then the Chairman of the Baku City Council Executive Committee. Until 1963, he was the Minister of Trade of the Azerbaijan SSR, and near the end of his life he worked in the office of the Council of Ministers of the Azerbaijan SSR.

Ahmadov was a member of the bureau of the Baku City Party Committee of the Azerbaijan Communist Party in 1955–1957, a member of the Central Committee of the Azerbaijan Communist Party in 1956–1961, and a member of the Inspection Commission of the Central Committee of the Azerbaijan Communist Party in 1961–1964. Elected Deputy of the Supreme Soviet of the USSR (3rd convocation), Deputy of the Supreme Soviet of the Azerbaijan SSR (2nd-5th convocation).

Ahmadov died in May 1964 in Baku.

== Awards ==
- Order of the Patriotic War (2nd degree)
- Order of the Red Banner of Labour (2 times)
- Order of the Badge of Honour
