= Mirza Jabbar Mammadzade =

Azerbaijani educator and professor

Mirza Jabbar Mammadzade Mirzə Cabbar Məmmədzadə
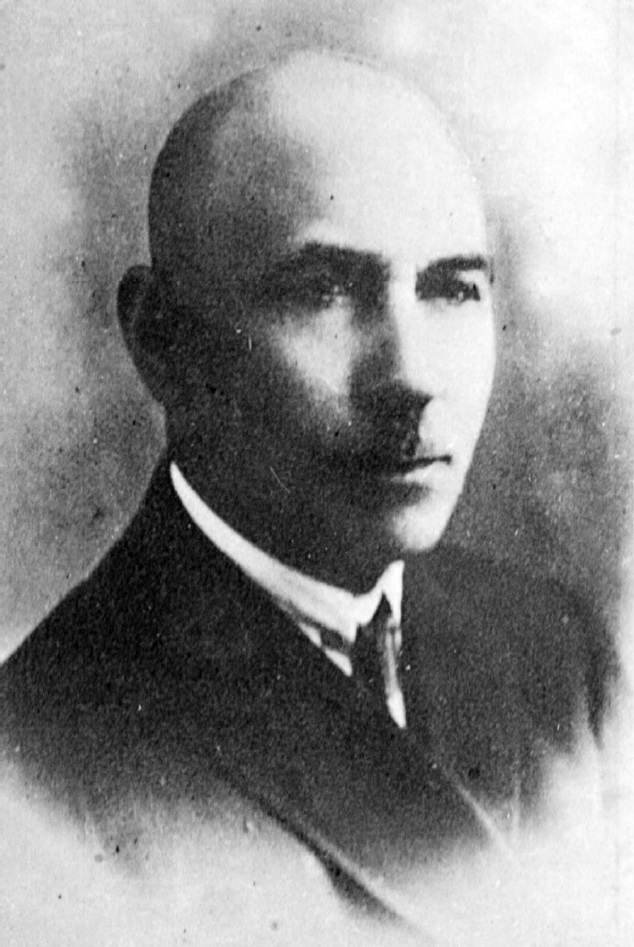

Deputy of the first convocation of the Parliament of the Republic of Armenia
- In office August 1, 1918 – June 4, 1919

Personal details
- Born: January 20, 1882 Erivan, Erivan uezd, Erivan Governorate, Russian Empire
- Died: January 3, 1938 (aged 55) Baku, Azerbaijan SSR, USSR
- Cause of death: political repression
- Children: Jalal Mammadov
- Education: Yerevan Teachers' Seminary

Mirza Jabbar Mirza Abbas oghlu Mammadzade (Azerbaijani: Mirzə Cabbar Mirzə Abbas oğlu Məmmədzadə, January 20, 1882 — January 3, 1938) was an Azerbaijani educator, pedagogue, doctor of pedagogical sciences, professor (1937). He was a deputy of the first convocation of the Parliament of the Republic of Armenia.

== Biography ==
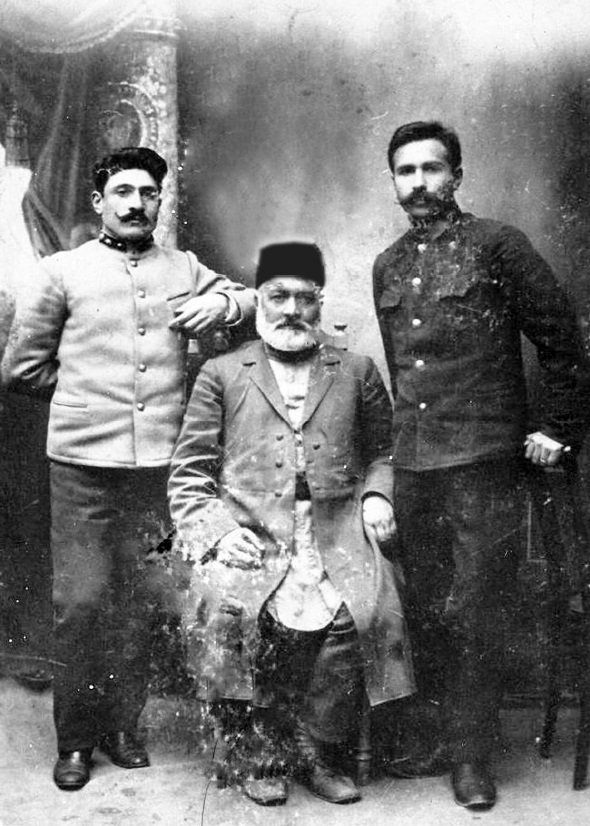
Mirza Jabbar Mammadzade, his father Mirza Abbas and Ibadullah Bey Muganlinsky

Mirza Jabbar Mammadzade was born on January 20, 1882, in Erivan. First, he received home education, and then he studied at the Yerevan Teachers' Seminary. After graduating from the seminary in 1902, Mirza Jabbar took an external exam and received a teaching certificate. From September 1902, he worked as a teacher at school in Nehram. In 1903, he went to teach at the Gamarli school, and in 1904 at the Imanshali school. From 1905 to September 1, 1906, he was the supervisor of Gamarli school.

Until January 19, 1913, he worked as a teacher of the Azerbaijani language at the Yerevan Teachers' Seminary.

On September 1, 1906, he was invited to the private preparatory school opened by Ibadulla bey Mughanlinski in Yerevan as a teacher of Russian language and mathematics. During World War I, the Russian government moved the seminary from the border city of Yerevan to Armavir. Mirza Jabbar Mammadzade also taught here from February 2, 1915, to May 1916. Until this time, three books compiled by him had been published.

After the Dashnaks came to power in 1918, Mirza Jabbar Mammadzade moved to Nakhchivan with his family because the Yerevan gymnasium and teachers' seminary were closed. He teaches Russian, Turkish and Azerbaijani languages at the higher primary school here. In addition, he participates in the defense of Nakhchivan from the Dashnaks.

In 1920, after Armenia was captured by the Bolsheviks, Mirza Jabbar returned to Yerevan. At the end of that year, he moved with his family from Yerevan to Baku, where he continued his teaching activities at Azerbaijan State University, Azerbaijan Pedagogical Institute, and Azerbaijan Cooperative Institute. In addition to writing poems, he conducted research on linguistics and wrote a manual called "Methodology of teaching the Azerbaijani language". In the 1920s, he was the author-compiler of twenty textbooks for primary and secondary schools in the Azerbaijani and Russian languages alone and jointly. He was elected to the position of head of the department, associate professor at the Azerbaijan Cooperative Institute. In 1935, he was awarded the title of candidate of sciences and professor in language and literature, and in 1937, he was awarded the title of doctor of sciences.

In October 1937, he and his family members were arrested. He was accused and shot in the investigative case number 12493. His wife and daughter were exiled. He was acquitted in 1957 after his innocence was proven.
