= Mustafa Topchubashov =

Azerbaijani physician (1895–1981)

- Mustafa Topçubaşov
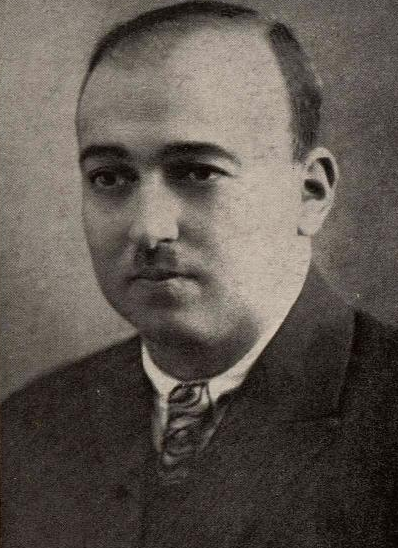
- Topchubashov in 1935

Chairman of the Supreme Soviet of the Azerbaijan SSR
- In office April 18, 1953 – March 25, 1955
- Preceded by: Aghamirza Ahmadov
- Succeeded by: Abdulla Bayramov

Chairman of the Supreme Soviet of the Azerbaijan SSR
- In office April 5, 1967 – July 1, 1971
- Preceded by: Mammad Arif
- Succeeded by: Suleyman Rustam

Personal details
- Born: August 17, 1895 Yerevan, Erivan uezd, Erivan Governorate, Russian Empire
- Died: November 20, 1981 (aged 86) Baku, Azerbaijan SSR, USSR
- Party: CPSU
- Spouse: Reyhan Topchubashova
- Education: Taras Shevchenko National University of Kyiv; Erivan Gymnasium
- Occupation: surgeon
- Awards: Honored Scientist of the Azerbaijan SSR

Mustafa Agha bey oglu Topchubashov (Azeri: Mustafa Topçubaşov; 5 August 1895 – 20 November 1981) was an Azerbaijani surgeon, Hero of Socialist Labor, Stalin Prize winner, and recipient of the Order of Lenin.

== Early life ==
Mustafa Topchubashov was born in Erivan, to Agha bey and Fatma khanim Topchubashov, wealthy landowners of the Erivan Governorate (then the Russian Empire, now in Armenia). After completing his primary and secondary education in his hometown, young Topchubashov left for Kiev in 1916 to study medicine at the Saint Vladimir University. Despite the outbreak of World War I and the subsequent Russian Civil War, he managed to obtain a degree and having suffered hunger and numerous arrests in the politically unstable Ukraine, came to Baku (then capital of the short-lived Azerbaijan Democratic Republic) in 1919 to work as an assistant at the Department of Surgery of the Azerbaijan State University. Beginning in 1922, Topchubashov worked in Nakhchivan, where he performed the first professional medical surgery both in his career and in the history of this city.

== Career ==
After spending six months in Germany, Topchubashov returned to Baku in 1927 and started working at the Azerbaijan Medical University. In 1930 he defended his Ph.D. thesis and was promoted to Head of Department of Surgery at the same university, where he worked for the next 45 years. During World War II he was in charge of the hospitals for evacuees in Azerbaijan. From 1950 on, he was Chairman of the Azerbaijan Committee for World Protection (local branch of the World Peace Council). He was one of the founders of the National Academy of Sciences of Azerbaijan whose vice president he was from 1951 to 1957 and from 1969 until his death. In 1951, Topchubashov became a corresponding member of the Bulgarian Academy of Sciences. He was elected active member of the Academy of Medical Sciences of the USSR in 1960.

In 1953–1955 and in 1967–1971, Topchubashov was Chairman of the Supreme Soviet of Azerbaijan SSR. In 1943 he received the Stalin Prize, the highest ranking award in the state. He was awarded the Order of Lenin thrice.

== Personal life ==
In 1923 he married young painter Reyhan Akhundova (1905–1970), a Guba-native. They had three children: son Ibrahim (1924–1970) and twin daughters Zemfira and Elmira (born 1927). Topchubashov's son, daughter Zemfira, and grandson Jeyhun pursued careers in medicine as well.

Mustafa Topchubashov died in 1981 in Baku. His name was given to a street in Baku, a ferryboat, and the Institute of Experimental Surgery, of which Topchubashov was head in 1945–1948. Azerbaijan Medical University students with high academic standing can be eligible for the Topchubashov Scholarship. Azerbaijani medics performing outstanding research in their field are awarded with the Medal of Topchubashov.

== Memory ==
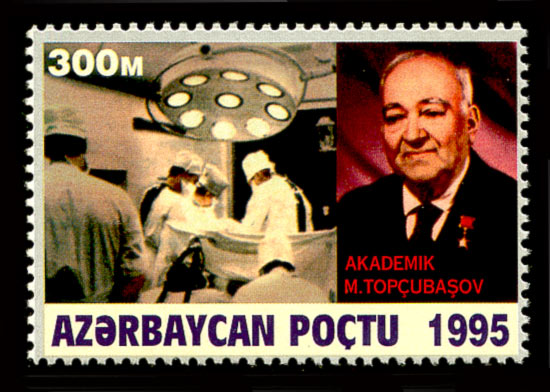
A postage stamp dedicated to the 100th anniversary of Mustafa Agabek oglu Topchibasheva

- In 1984, the name M. A. Topchubashova was admitted to the Research Institute of Clinical and Experimental Surgeons in Baku.
- One of the streets in Baku bears his name.
- In 1995, a postage stamp of Azerbaijan was dedicated to Topchubashov.
