= Mammadzade =

Mammadzade, Mammadzada (Azerbaijani: Məmmədzadə) is an Azerbaijani surname. Notable people with the surname include:

- Mirza Jabbar Mammadzade (1882—1938), Azerbaijani educator
- Gunay Mammadzada
