= Taghizade =

Taghizade is a surname. Notable people with the surname include:

- Ali Taghizade (1883–1966), Azerbaijani-Soviet revolutionary
- Aykhan Taghizade (born 1996), Azerbaijani taekwondo practitioner
