= Ali Taghizade =

Azerbaijani-Soviet politician

- Əli Tağızadə

Chairman of the Supreme Soviet of the Azerbaijan SSR
- In office November 25, 1959 – March 29, 1963
- Preceded by: Gazanfar Jafarli
- Succeeded by: Mammad Arif

People's Commissar of Social Security of the Armenian SSR
- In office 1929–1932
- Preceded by: Bala Afandiyev
- Succeeded by: Artem Aghamalyan

First Secretary of the Vedi District Party Committee
- In office 1933–1935

Personal details
- Born: April 3, 1883 Tbilisi, Tiflis Governorate, Russian Empire
- Died: February 3, 1966 (aged 82) Baku, Azerbaijan SSR, USSR
- Resting place: Alley of Honor
- Party: Communist Party of the Soviet Union
- Awards: Order of the Red Banner of Labour

Ali Ali oghlu Taghizade (Azerbaijani: Əli Əli oğlu Tağızadə, April 3, 1883–February 3, 1966) was an Azerbaijani-Soviet revolutionary and statesman, Chairman of the Supreme Soviet of the Azerbaijan SSR (1959–1963), People's Commissar of Social Security of the Armenian SSR (1929–1932), First Secretary of the Vedi District Party Committee (1933–1935).

== Biography ==
=== Early life and revolutionary activity ===
Ali Taghizade was born on April 3, 1883, in Tbilisi. From an early age, he dropped out of primary school and began working as a master apprentice in a paint shop. He joined the revolutionary movement in 1903 and became a member of the RSDLP in June 1906. Ali Taghizade, along with other Bolsheviks, took an active part in the establishment of Hummet's branches in Tbilisi, Nakhchivan, Julfa and other cities on behalf of the party.

In 1907, Ali Taghizade was sent to South Azerbaijan by the RSDLP Caucasus Union Committee to help workers and peasants who rebelled against the Gajar government. He worked with the Bolsheviks H. Tanriverdiyev, I. Mikaladze, S. Banvoryan, and others. After returning to Tbilisi, he took part in organizing the sending of ammunition to the Iranian revolutionaries. For this activity he was arrested by the secret service in August 1908 and placed in the fortress of Metex. He was released from prison due to lack of convincing evidence. In 1911, he went to Iran for the second time on behalf of the party and carried out revolutionary propaganda there.

Ali Taghizade, who returned to Tbilisi on the eve of the October Revolution, along with other Bolsheviks, made strong statements against the Turks and the Germans, as well as their supporters, the Georgian Mensheviks and Musavatists, and he twice visited Ganja and Qazax and reported to the members of the Caucasian Bolshevik Committee on the current situation. On the instructions of the party, Ali Taghizade was sent to Gadabay in the summer of 1918 to carry out propaganda work among the workers of the copper plant. At that time, he was engaged in organizing the centers of the Communist Party in the villages of Borchaly Uyezd, in a number of enterprises in Tbilisi. Ali Taghizade took an active part in the preparation of an armed uprising against the Georgian Menshevik government as a member of the headquarters of one of the districts of Tbilisi. He was a member of the Tbilisi Revolutionary Committee and was elected secretary of the district party committee at the 6th district party conference. He was later elected a delegate to the IX All-Russian Congress of Soviets, headed by Vladimir Lenin.

=== Activities during the Soviet era ===
After the establishment of the Soviet power in Georgia, Ali Taghizade worked here as a party secretary of the Borchali Uyezd Party Committee, chairman of a sheep-breeding cooperative in Tbilisi in 1925–1927, member of the board of the Supreme Court of the Georgian SSR in 1927–1928, and in 1928–1929 was the head of the department of the Transcaucasian Trade Department.

Ali Taghizade was sent to the Armenian SSR in 1929–1932, was the People's Commissar of Social Security of the Armenian SSR, as well as the editor of the "Golden Dawn" newspaper published in Yerevan. He was elected a member of the bureau of the Central Committee of the Armenian Communist Party, and from 1933 to 1935 he worked as the first secretary of the Vedi District Party Committee. He was arrested as an enemy of the people in 1938, but was released in 1940. After that, he was sent to Garalar village of Vedi region as a library director, but later came to Baku due to persecution.

Ali Taghizade, who retired in 1946 and lived in Baku, was elected a deputy of the Supreme Soviet of the Azerbaijan SSR (4th-6th convocation), and in 1959-1963 he was its chairman. He was a member of the Central Executive Committees of the TSFSR, Georgia and Armenia, the Central Committees of Azerbaijan and Armenia, and the Presidium of the Supreme Soviet of the Azerbaijan SSR. In the last years of his life he served as chairman of the Revolutionary Glory Council under the Central Committee of the Leninist Communist Youth Union of Azerbaijan.

Ali Taghizade was awarded the Order of the Red Banner of Labor and the Order of the Red Banner of the Armenian SSR (1936), as well as medals for his active participation in the first Russian revolution of 1905–1907 and for his revolutionary services.

Ali Taghizade died on February 3, 1966. One of the streets in Baku is named after him.
