= Erivan Teachers' Seminary =

Pedagogical institution in Yerevan

- Russian: Эриванская учительская семинария
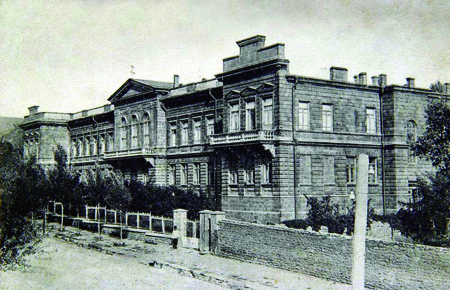
- Active: November 20, 1881–August 16, 1918
- Location: Erivan, Russian Empire

Erivan Teachers' Seminary (Armenian: Երևանի ուսուցչական սեմինարիա; Russian: Эриванская учительская семинария) was an educational institution operating in the city of Yerevan at the end of the 19th century and the beginning of the 20th century.

== History ==
The Erivan Teachers' Seminary was established in accordance with the decision of the State Council of the Russian Empire dated October 20, 1880. The ceremonial opening of the Erivan Teachers' Seminary took place on November 20, 1881.

This educational institution, which operated for 37 years, was closed on August 6, 1918, at the same time as the Erivan Gymnasium and the Ulukhanli school.

As in other seminaries operating on the territory of the empire, education at the Erivan Teacher's Seminary was paid. Only a certain part of the students studied at the expense of the state. Those admitted paid 210 manats in the first school year, and 180 manats in the following years. According to the information of 1907, only 20 of the 70 students studying here at their own expense. According to the information given in the 1913 edition of the "Caucasian Calendar", 46 of the 128 students studying at the seminary were Russian, 37 Armenian, 30 Turkic (Tatar), 6 Georgian, and 9 from other nationalities.

On December 29, 2021, the President of Azerbaijan signed a Decree on the celebration of the 140th anniversary of the Erivan Teachers' Seminary.
