= Rakhshanda Babayeva =

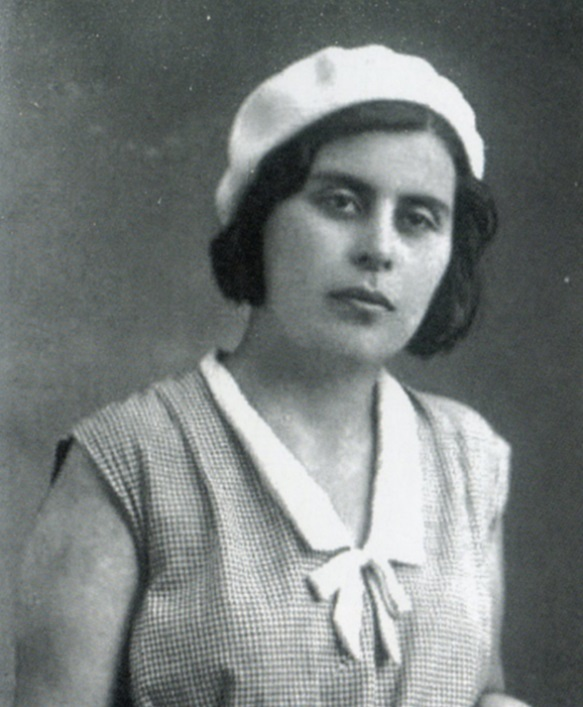
- Born: 1904; Baku,Russian Empire
- Died: 1969-03-30
- Occupation: ethnographer
- Known for: "Wedding Traditions of the City of Quba" and "Ancient Wedding Traditions of Baku and Absheron."
- Relatives: Reyhan Topchubashova

Rakhshanda Babayeva— was an Azerbaijani ethnographer, notable for being the first female Azerbaijani ethnographer.

She is the author of the monographs "Wedding Traditions of the City of Quba" and "Ancient Wedding Traditions of Baku and Absheron."

== Life ==
Rakhshanda Akhundova was born in 1904 in the city of Baku. She received her initial education from a mullah, from whom she also learned Arabic. Later, together with her sister Reyhan, she began studying at the Empress Alexandra Russian-Muslim Girls’ School in Baku, established through the efforts of Haji Zeynalabdin Taghiyev. After completing her education, she started teaching at the St. Nina Girls’ Gymnasium.

In 1932, she was admitted to the Faculty of History at the Azerbaijan State Pedagogical University named after Lenin. In 1936, she graduated with honors. On February 10, 1937, she began working at the Department of the History of Material Culture within the Institute of History, Archaeology, and Ethnography of the Azerbaijan Branch of the USSR Academy of Sciences—initially as a junior researcher, and later as a senior researcher.

Her first monographic work, "Wedding Customs of the City of Quba", was published in 1946. In this work, the wedding traditions and customs of the Azerbaijani people were studied from an ethnographic perspective. In 1949, she was sent on assignment to the Institute of Ethnography of the USSR. While in Moscow, under the supervision of Yevgeny Shilling, she completed her candidate’s dissertation on the topic "Ancient Wedding Customs in Absheron". In October 1949, she gave a presentation titled "The Wedding Cycle in Absheron" at the Institute of Ethnography, and her work "Ancient Wedding Customs in Absheron" was translated into Russian.

In the final years of her life, she worked on the monograph titled "Ancient Wedding Customs of Baku and Absheron". She collected folklore materials related to the family life, songs, riddles, and proverbs of the people of Absheron.

In 1951, during the 18th Congress of the Communist Party of Azerbaijan (Bolsheviks), Mir Jafar Baghirov spoke critically about the research conducted by scholars at the academy and mockingly referred to Rakhshanda Akhundova’s monograph "Ancient Wedding Customs of Baku and Absheron" as an “important scientific work.” Following this, Rakhshanda Akhundova was dismissed from her position by decision of the Presidium of the Academy of Sciences of the Azerbaijan SSR. She died on March 30, 1969, after a prolonged illness.

Her book "Wedding Customs of the City of Quba" was republished in 2022 in Latin script by the Institute of History of the Azerbaijan National Academy of Sciences.

== Family ==
Rakhshanda Akhundova’s grandfather, Mirza Heybat Akhundzadeh, was a poet who wrote under the pen name Fəda. Her father, Ibrahim Akhundov, worked as a clerk in the provincial administration of Baku and died in 1910. Her mother, Fatma Khanum, was from the Hacinski family. Her aunt, Sakina Akhundzadeh, was the first female playwright of Azerbaijan, and her sister, Reyhan Topchubashova, was the first female painter of Azerbaijan.

In the 1930s, Rakhshanda Akhundova married Aliheydar Babayev, a technology engineer by profession. They had two children: a son named Altay, born in 1933, and a daughter named Leylufer, born in 1938. Aliheydar Babayev worked at the "Azneft" union and also taught at the Polytechnic School. In 1943, he was arrested on suspicion of having ties with Nazi Germany. Although he was released in 1946, he was not allowed to reside in Baku, and moved to Mingachevir where he worked at the Mingachevir Dam for some time. In 1956, he was officially acquitted and declared innocent. He died in Quba after suffering a stroke.
