= Metekhi =

Metekhi მეტეხი
- district
- Location within Tbilisi
- Coordinates: 41°41′24″N 44°48′40″E
- Country: Georgia
- City: Tbilisi
- Raioni: Old Tbilisi
- Time zone: UTC+4 (Georgian Time)

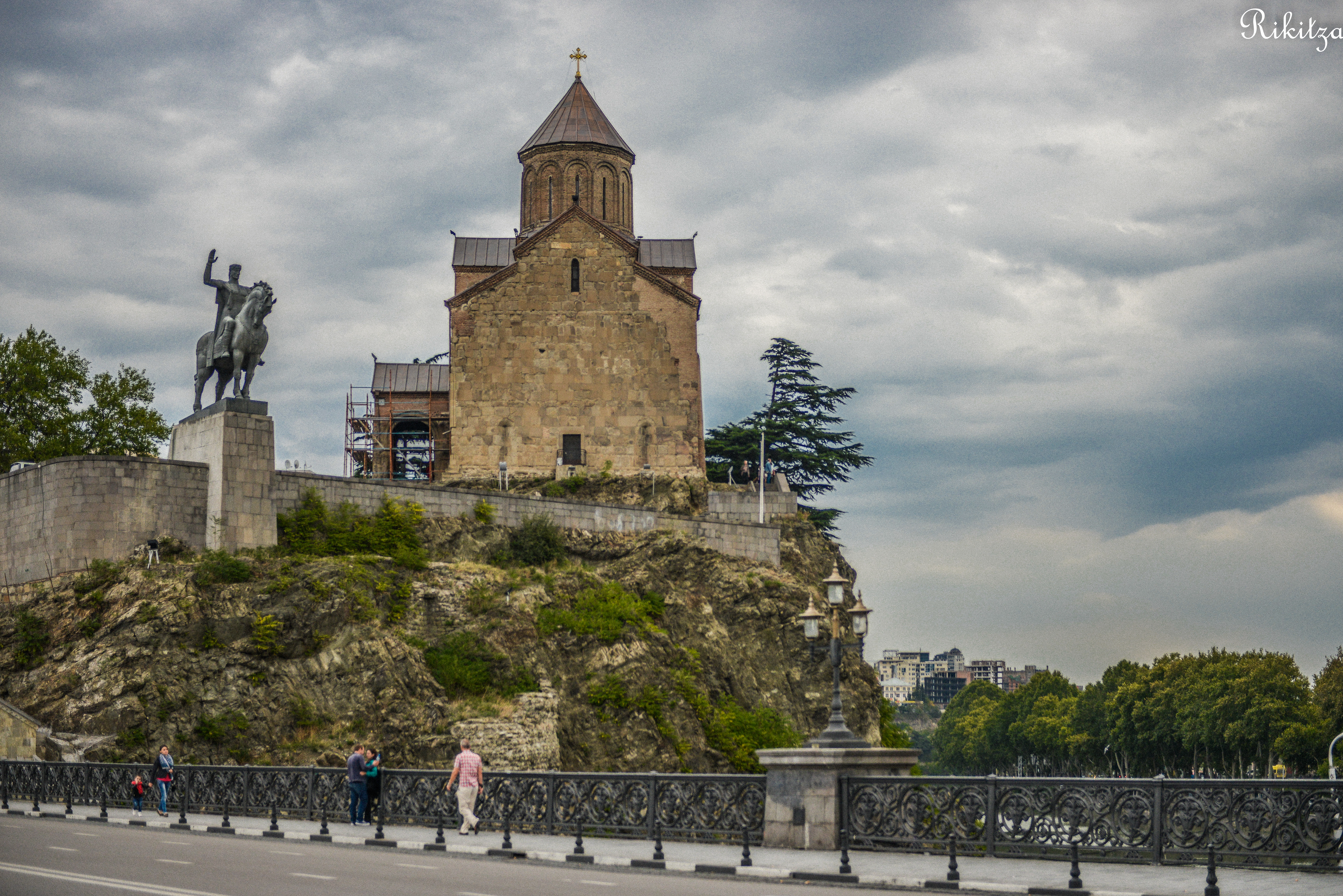
The Metekhi Church and the equestrian statue of King Vakhtang Gorgasali

Metekhi (Metechi; Georgian: მეტეხი) is a historic neighborhood of Tbilisi, Georgia, located (42.92N 44.34E) on the elevated cliff that overlooks the Mtkvari river. The neighborhood is home to the eponymous Metekhi Church of Assumption.

== History ==
The district was one of the earliest inhabited areas on the city's territory. According to traditional accounts, King Vakhtang I Gorgasali erected here a church and a fort which served also as a king's residence; hence comes the name Metekhi which dates back to the 12th century and literally means “the area around the palace”. Tradition holds that it was also a site where the 5th-century martyr lady Saint Shushanik was buried. However, none of these structures have survived the Mongol invasion of 1235.

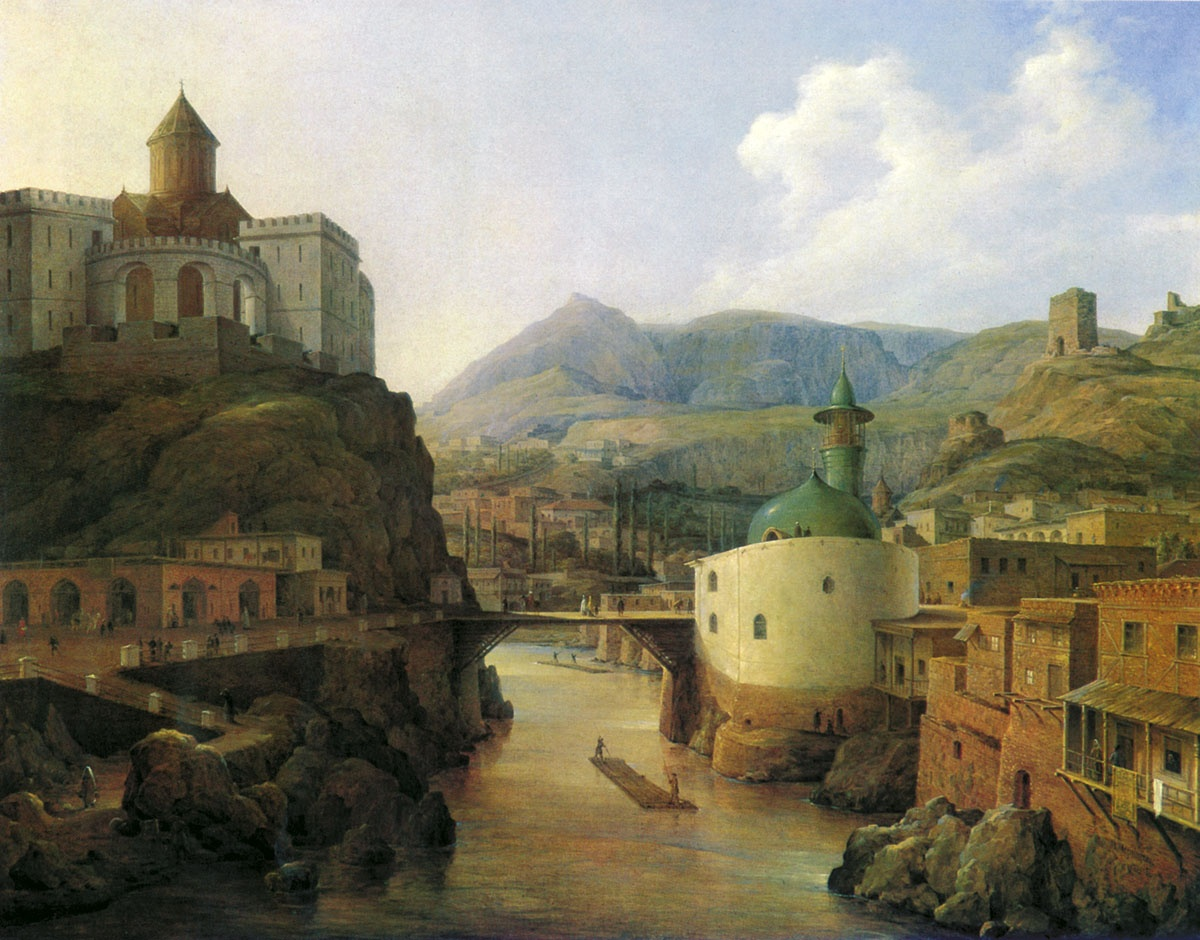
The Metekhi cliff and surroundings by a Russian painter N. G. Chernetsov, 1839. Opposite is seen the "Shah-Abbas Mosque" (1600s)

The extant Metekhi Church of Assumption, resting upon the top of the hill, was built by the Georgian king St Demetrius II circa 1278–1284 and is somewhat an unusual example of domed Georgian Orthodox church. It was later damaged and restored several times. Safavid-appointed vali/king Rostom (r. 1633–1658) fortified the area around the church with a strong citadel and garrisoned it with Iranian soldiers. Under the Russian rule (established in 1801), the church lost its religious purpose and was used as a barracks (R. G. Suny, p. 93). The citadel was demolished in 1819 and replaced by a new building which functioned as the infamous jail down to the Soviet era, and was closed only in 1938.

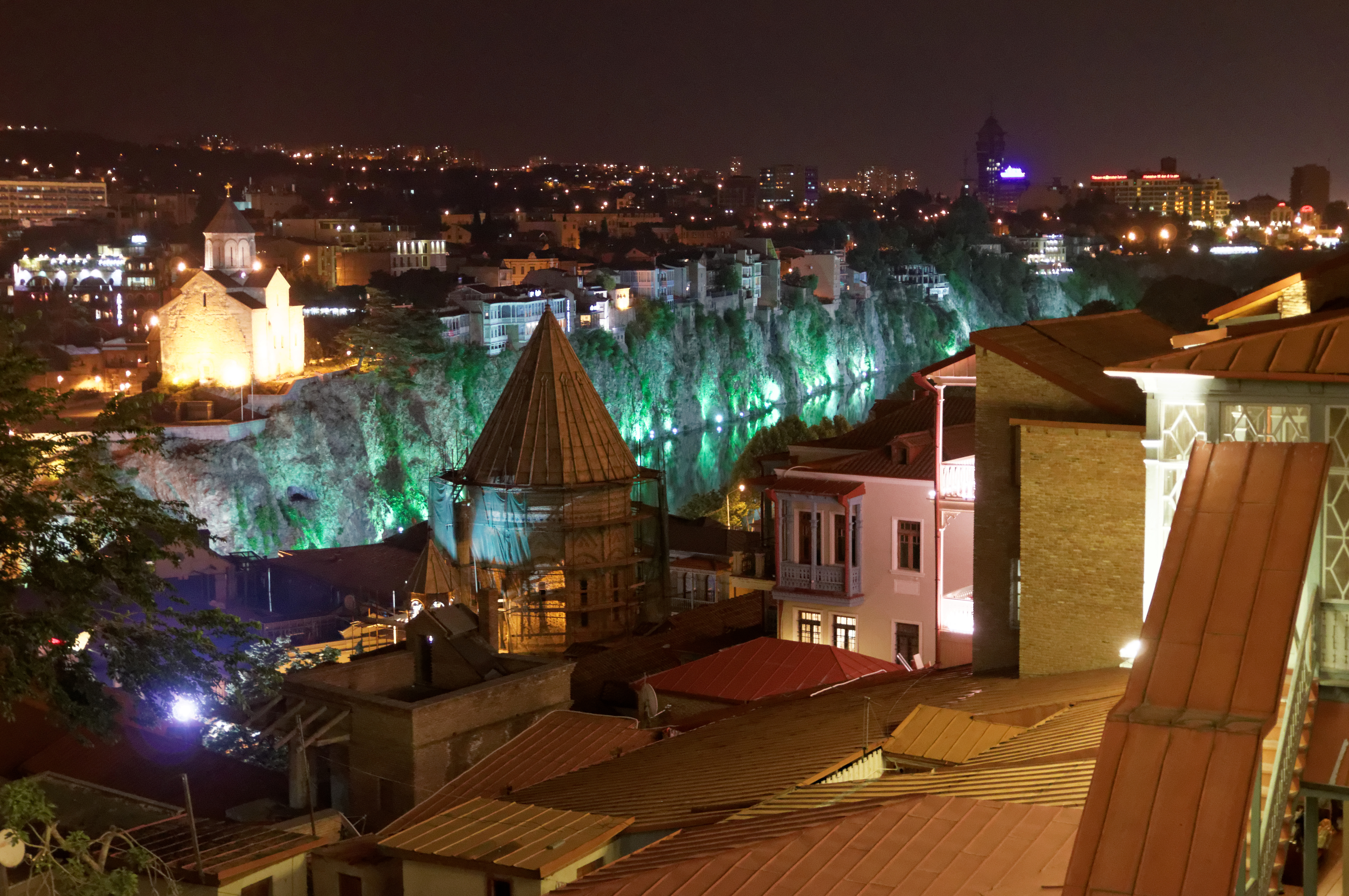
The Metekhi cliff at night

Amid the Great Purges, the Georgian Communist chief Lavrenti Pavlovich Beria intended to destroy the church as well, but met a stubborn opposition by a group of Georgian intellectuals led by the painter and art collector Dimitri Shevardnadze. Beria replied to their urges, that it would surely be enough to preserve a scale model of the church so that people could see it in a museum, and then is said to have told Shevardnadze privately that if he gave up his efforts to save the church he would be appointed director of the future museum. The artist refused and was imprisoned and executed (Ami Knight, p. 84). The building was preserved, however. In the later part of Soviet period the church was used as a theatre. The equestrian statue of King Vakhtang I Gorgaslan by the sculptor Elguja Amashukeli was erected in front of the church in 1961.

In the late 1980s, Catholicos-Patriarch of All Georgia Ilia II launched a popularly supported campaign aiming at the restoration of the church to the Georgian Patriarchate. A well-known dissident and the future president of Georgia Zviad Gamsakhurdia went on a hunger strike in support of this demand. Despite initial resistance from the local Communist leadership, the church became functioning again in 1988.

== Architecture ==
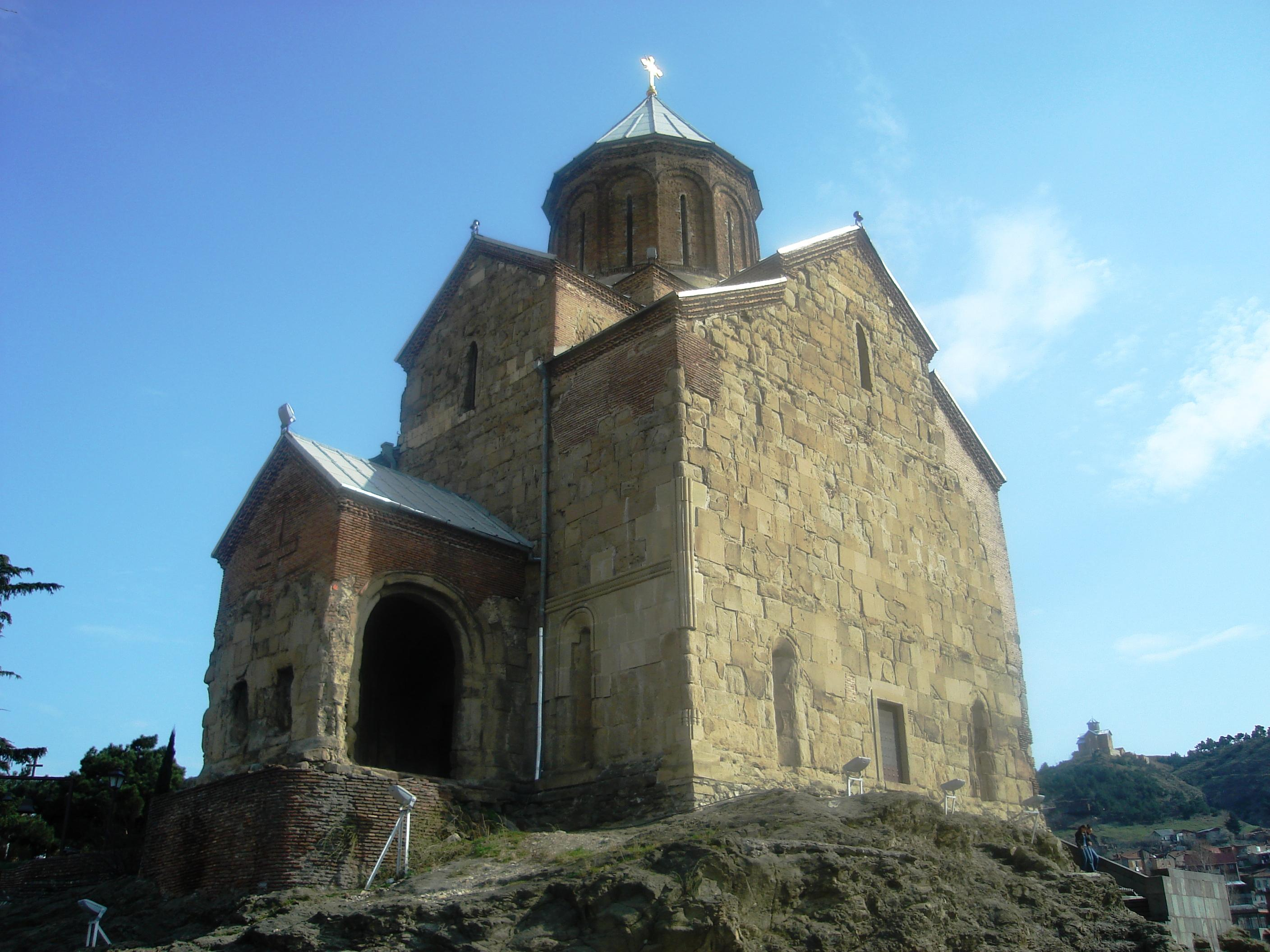
Another view of the Metekhi church

The Metekhi church is a cross-cupola church. While this style was the most common throughout the Middle Ages, the Metekhi church is somewhat anachronistic with its three projecting apses in the east facade and the four freestanding pillars supporting the cupola within. The church is made of brick and dressed stone. The restoration of the 17th, 18th, and 19th centuries mostly employed brick. The facade is for the most part smooth, with decorative elements concentrated around the windows of the eastern apses. Horizontal bands below the gables run around all four sides and serve as a unifying element. The north portico of the main entrance is not a later addition but was built at the same time as the rest of the church.

Legend has it also that the Metekhi cliff was a site of the martyrdom of Habo (8th century), Tbilisi’s patron saint. A small church in his honor is now under construction at the foot of the cliff.

The cliff is connected to the opposite, right embankment of the Mtkvari river, via a reinforced concrete bridge, which was constructed in 1951 at the place of the two older bridges. Unfortunately, a unique complex of various structures and buildings dating from the 17th to 19th centuries were destroyed during the construction of the bridge. Recently, the city's government announced its intention to restore this part of historic Old Tbilisi as it was in the first half of the 20th century.

== Sources ==
- Ronald Grigor Suny, The Making of the Georgian Nation: 2nd edition (December 1994), Indiana University Press, ISBN 0-253-20915-3
- Amid Knight, Beria: Stalin’s First Lieutenant, Princeton University Press, ISBN 0-691-01093-5
- Lloyd E Hudman, Eva H Essa, Richard H Jackson, Geography of Travel & Tourism, Thomson Delmar Learning, ISBN 0-7668-3256-2
