= Rvo =

- Municipality
- Location within Azerbaijan
- Coordinates: 38°43′05″N 48°45′11″E
- Country: Azerbaijan
- Rayon: Lankaran

Population
  - Total: 1,462
- Time zone: UTC+4 (AZT)
  - Summer (DST): UTC+5 (AZT)

Rvo (also, Rivo) is a village and municipality in the Lankaran Rayon of Azerbaijan. It has a population of 1,462. The municipality consists of the villages of Rvo, Siyablı, and Mollakənd.
