= Gazanfar Jafarli =

- Qəzənfər Cəfərli

Chairman of the Supreme Soviet of the Azerbaijan SSR
- In office March 25, 1959 – November 25, 1959
- Preceded by: Mirza Ibrahimov
- Succeeded by: Ali Taghizade

Personal details
- Born: May 25, 1920 Ganja, Ganja uezd, Azerbaijan SSR
- Died: unknown
- Party: All-Union Communist (Bolshevik) Party

Gazanfar Musa oghlu Jafarli (Azerbaijani: Qəzənfər Musa oğlu Cəfərli, May 25, 1920 — unknown) was an Azerbaijani-Soviet statesman and party figure, chairman of the Supreme Soviet of the Azerbaijan SSR.

== Biography ==
Gazanfar Jafarli was born in 1920 in Ganja. After graduating from high school in 1937, Gazanfar Jafarli was admitted to the faculty of physics and mathematics of the Azerbaijan State University, where he graduated in 1941. During his studies, he also worked as a teacher in Baku schools. He received the degree of Candidate of Technical Sciences, the title of associate professor.

At the beginning of the Great Patriotic War, G. Jafarli joined the Soviet Army, graduated from the anti-aircraft artillery school, and fought as a platoon commander and battery commander on the Volkhov, Leningrad, 1st Ukrainian Front, Poland, Czechoslovakia, Hungary and other countries. In the Soviet Army, he was first a candidate for membership in the Communist Party, and since April 1943 has been a member of the party. In the same years he was elected party organizer of the battery, a member of the regimental party bureau.

After the war, Gazanfar Jafarli was discharged from the army and worked as an assistant commissioner for the party control commission for the Azerbaijan SSR under the Central Committee of the All-Union Communist (Bolshevik) Party, and then as a responsible inspector. In May 1947, he was appointed an instructor in the Central Committee of the Communist Party of Azerbaijan, and then the head of the department of the party, trade union, and Komsomol bodies.

In January 1949, Gazanfar Jafarli was elected the first secretary of the Dastafur District party committee. He headed the district for more than a year and a half, and in September 1950 went to study at the Higher Party School under the Central Committee of the Communist Party of the Soviet Union. After graduating in 1953, Jafarli was appointed deputy head of the department of party, trade union, and Komsomol bodies of the Central Committee of the Communist Party of Azerbaijan, and in June 1954 he was appointed head of that department. He was a member of the bureau of the Central Committee of the Communist Party of Azerbaijan in January 1957, and in July 1958 was elected Secretary of the Central Committee of the Communist Party of Azerbaijan.

On March 25, 1959, Gazanfar Jafarli was appointed chairman of the Supreme Soviet of the Azerbaijan SSR. He held this position until November 25 of that year.

== Awards ==
- Order of Alexander Nevsky — April 29, 1945
- Order of the Patriotic War (1st degree)—June 27, 1944
- Medal "For Battle Merit" — February 17, 1944
- Medal "For the Defence of Leningrad"
- Medal "For the Liberation of Prague"
- Medal "For the Victory over Germany in the Great Patriotic War 1941–1945"
