= Jalal Mammadov =

Jalal Mammadov Cəlal Məmmədov

First Deputy Chairman of the Azerbaijan SSR State Publishing, Printing and Book Trade Affairs Committee
- In office June 30, 1975 – February 4, 1983

Editor-in-chief of "Azerbaijan" magazine
- In office 1966–1975
- Preceded by: Gylman Ilkin
- Succeeded by: Ismayil Shykhly

Personal details
- Born: December 9, 1918 Erivan, Erivan uezd, Erivan Governorate, Republic of Armenia
- Died: February 4, 1983 (aged 64) Baku, Azerbaijan SSR, USSR
- Resting place: II Alley of Honor
- Parent: Mirza Jabbar Mammadzade (father)
- Awards: Honored Art Worker of the Azerbaijan SSR

Jalal Jabbar oghlu Mammadov (Azerbaijani: Cəlal Cabbar oğlu Məmmədov, December 9, 1918 – February 4, 1983) was an Azerbaijani public figure and statesman, writer, translator, editor-in-chief of "Azerbaijan" magazine (1966–1975), Honored Artist of the Azerbaijan SSR, Secretary of the Union of Writers of the USSR and the Azerbaijan SSR.

== Biography ==
Jalal Mammadov was born on December 9, 1918. He graduated from the Faculty of Law of Azerbaijan State University. He worked as the editor of the fiction department at Azernashr, the editor-in-chief at the Azerbaijan Teaching and Pedagogical Publishing House, the deputy chairman of the Radio Broadcasts and State Television Committee, and the deputy editor at the "Communist" newspaper. In 1966, he was appointed the editor-in-chief of "Azerbaijan" magazine, and from 1975 until the end of his life, he worked as the first deputy chairman of the State Committee on Book Trade, Printing and Publishing.

Jalal Mammadov died on February 4, 1983, in Baku.
