= Supreme Soviet of Azerbaijan =

Soviet Azerbaijan legislative body (1938–1995)

Supreme Soviet of the Azerbaijan SSR Supreme Soviet of the Azerbaijan Republic Азәрбајҹан ССР Али Совети Azərbaycan Respublikasının Ali Soveti (Azerbaijani) Верховный Совет Азербайджанской ССР Верховный Совет Азербайджанской Республики (Russian)
- (Azerbaijan Soviet Socialist Republic) Azerbaijan SSR (1938–1991); Azerbaijan (1991–1995)
- Emblem before (left) and after (right) the dissolution of the Soviet Union

Type
- Type: Unicameral (Supreme Soviet)

History
- Established: 24 June 1938
- Disbanded: 24 November 1995
- Preceded by: Parliament of the Azerbaijan Democratic Republic
- Succeeded by: National Assembly

Leadership
- Chairperson: Rasul Guliyev (last)

Elections
- Last election: 1990

Meeting place
- Building of the Supreme Soviet, Baku

The Supreme Soviet of the Azerbaijan SSR (Note: Azerbaijani: Азәрбајҹан ССР Али Совети, romanized: Azərbaycan SSR Ali Soveti Russian: Верховный Совет Азербайджанской ССР, romanized: Verkhovnyy Sovet Azerbaydzhanskoy SSR), later renamed as the Supreme Soviet of the Azerbaijan Republic (Note: Azerbaijani: Azərbaycan Respublikasının Ali Soveti Russian: Верховный Совет Азербайджанской Республики, romanized: Verkhovnyy Sovet Azerbaydzhanskoy Respubliki) (Note: Sometimes translated as Supreme Council of the Azerbaijan Republic) from 1991 until its abolition in 1995, was the supreme soviet (main legislative institution) of the Azerbaijan SSR, and later the Republic of Azerbaijan. The Supreme Soviet officially disbanded in 1995 when a semi-presidential system was implemented.

== History ==
During the last session of Azerbaijani Parliament on April 27, 1920 under pressure of the Bolshevik Russian 11th Red Army and ultimatum from Caucasian Committee of the Russian Communist Party which invaded Azerbaijan, the deputies decided to disband the government in favour of the Bolsheviks to avoid bloodshed.

Once the Bolsheviks took over, they abolished all structures of the Azerbaijani government and established the Azerbaijan Interim Revolutionary Committee administered by Azerbaijani communists Nariman Narimanov, Aliheydar Garayev, Gazanfar Musabekov, Hamid Sultanov and Dadash Bunyadzade. The Bolsheviks dissolved the Azerbaijani Army, executed its generals and officers, and nationalized private industries.

In May 1921, the first All-Azerbaijan Soviet Session made up of newly elected deputies from all regions of Azerbaijan convened in Baku. The Provisional Revolutionary Committee and all existing local committees were effectively canceled. 1,400 village Soviets were established and 30,000 deputies were organized. The first session established the Azerbaijan Central Executive Committee consisting of 75 members and its board with 13 members. From 1921 through 1937, nine sessions of All-Azerbaijan Soviets were convened.

In 1937, during the 9th session of the All-Azerbaijani Soviets a new Azerbaijan SSR Constitution was ratified and the new legislative body the Supreme Soviet of Azerbaijan SSR was established.

The first elections to Supreme Soviet took place on June 24, 1938. Out of 310 deputies elected, 107 were workers, 88 collective farmers and 115 educated civil servants. 72 of the deputies were women. Due to the authoritarian nature of Soviet rule where most new initiatives were met with hostility, the parliament was virtually ineffective. Due to multiple reforms and restructuring in the government of the Azerbaijan SSR in the 1970s–1980s, the role of the Supreme Soviet increased. Many legislative reforms including the ratification of the new Azerbaijan SSR Constitution of 1977 took place. After the demands of the Armenian SSR to transfer the NKAO region of Azerbaijan to Armenia, the parliament was largely passive and indifferent. On October 18, 1991 the Supreme Soviet passed a resolution confirming the restoration of the independence of Azerbaijan.

== Convocations ==
- 1st Convocation (1938–1947)
- 2nd Convocation (1947–1950)
- 3rd Convocation (1951–1955)
- 4th Convocation (1955–1959)
- 5th Convocation (1959–1963)
- 6th Convocation (1963–1966)
- 7th Convocation (1967–1971)
- 8th Convocation (1971–1975)
- 9th Convocation (1975–1980)
- 10th Convocation (1980–1985)
- 11th Convocation (1985–1991)
- 12th Convocation (1991–1995)

== Chairperson ==
No.	Picture	Name (Birth–Death)	Took office	Left office	Political party
Chairperson of the Supreme Soviet
1		Mir Teymur Yagubov (1904–1970)	18 July 1938	7 April 1941	CPSU
2		Aziz Aliyev (1896–1962)	7 April 1941	6 March 1944	CPSU
3		Sultan Gafarzade (1908–1955)	6 March 1944	22 March 1947	CPSU
4		Yusif Yusifov (1906–1995)	22 March 1947	26 March 1951	CPSU
5		Aghamirza Ahmadov (1905–1964)	26 March 1951	18 April 1953	CPSU
6		Mustafa Topchubashov (1895–1981)	18 April 1953	25 March 1955	CPSU
7		Abdulla Bayramov (1912–1977)	25 March 1955	23 January 1958	CPSU
8		Mirza Ibrahimov (1911–1993)	23 January 1958	25 March 1959	CPSU
9		Gazanfar Jafarli (1920–1973)	25 March 1959	26 November 1959	CPSU
10		Ali Taghizade (1883–1966)	26 November 1959	29 March 1963	CPSU
11		Mammad Dadashzade (1904–1975)	29 March 1963	5 April 1967	CPSU
12		Mustafa Topchubashov (1895–1981)	5 April 1967	1 July 1971	CPSU
13		Suleyman Rustamzade (1906–1989)	1 July 1971	10 June 1989	CPSU
14		Elmira Gafarova (1934–1993)	18 May 1990	5 March 1992	CPSU
15		Yagub Mammadov (born 1941)	5 March 1992	18 May 1992	None
16		Isa Gambar (born 1957)	18 May 1992	15 June 1993	Musavat
17		Heydar Aliyev (1923–2003)	15 June 1993	5 November 1993	New Azerbaijan Party
18		Rasul Guliyev (born 1947)	5 November 1993	24 November 1995	None

== See also ==
- Chairperson of the Presidium of the Supreme Soviet of the Azerbaijan Soviet Socialist Republic
- Supreme Soviet of the Soviet Union
- Supreme Soviet
