= Reyhan Topchubashova =

Azerbaijani painter (1905–1970)

Reyhan Topchubashova Reyhan Topçubaşova
- Born: Reyhan İbrahim qızı Axundova; December 15, 1905; Quba, Russian Empire
- Died: March 5, 1970 (aged 64); Baku, Azerbaijan SSR
- Citizenship: USSR
- Occupation: Painter
- Spouse: Mustafa Topchubashov
- Children: Ibrahim Topchubashov, Zemfira, Elmira
- Relatives: Rakhshanda Babayeva
- Awards: Honored Art Worker of the Azerbaijan SSR

Reyhan Topchubashova (Azerbaijani: Reyhan Topçubaşova; 15 December 1905 – 5 March 1970) was an Azerbaijani painter, Honored Art Worker of the USSR.

== Biography ==
Reyhan Topchubashova was born on December 15, 1905, in Quba. She studied at the Technical School of Art in Baku in 1931-1935. In 1941-1945 she was Deputy Chairman of the Board of the Union of Artists of Azerbaijan. Since 1943 she was the Honored Art Worker of the USSR.

In 1923, Reyhan Topchubashova married a doctor Mustafa Topchubashov. Her son Ibrahim Topchubashov was born in 1924, and in 1927 Zemfira and Elmira twins were born. She was one of the first Azerbaijani women painters.

The artist's works have been displayed in national exhibitions since 1936. Reyhan Topchubashova has worked in portrait, domestic, landscape genres, as well as compositions and still lifes. The nature of Absheron is the main theme in her landscape works. The artist drawing posters of propaganda during the Second World War also designed costume sketches for song and dance ensembles. "Mirza Alakbar Sabir", "Gamar Almaszade", "Old Bazaar", "Wedding", "Street", "Maiden Tower", "Sea", "The View of Mardakan", "Night View of the Sea", "Autoportrait", "Nizami Ganjavi", are the most known paintings of Reyhan Topchubashova. She was also the designer of Tarlan Ballet, written by A. Badalbeyli in 1950. Her works are displayed in the collections of various Baku museums.

Reyhan Topchubashova died on March 5, 1970, in Baku.
