= Aralez =

Village in Ararat, Armenia

Aralez Արալեզ
- Location within Armenia Location within Ararat
- Coordinates: 39°54′01″N 44°39′12″E
- Country: Armenia
- Province: Ararat
- Municipality: Vedi

Population (2011)
  - Total: 2,243
- Time zone: UTC+4
  - Summer (DST): UTC+5

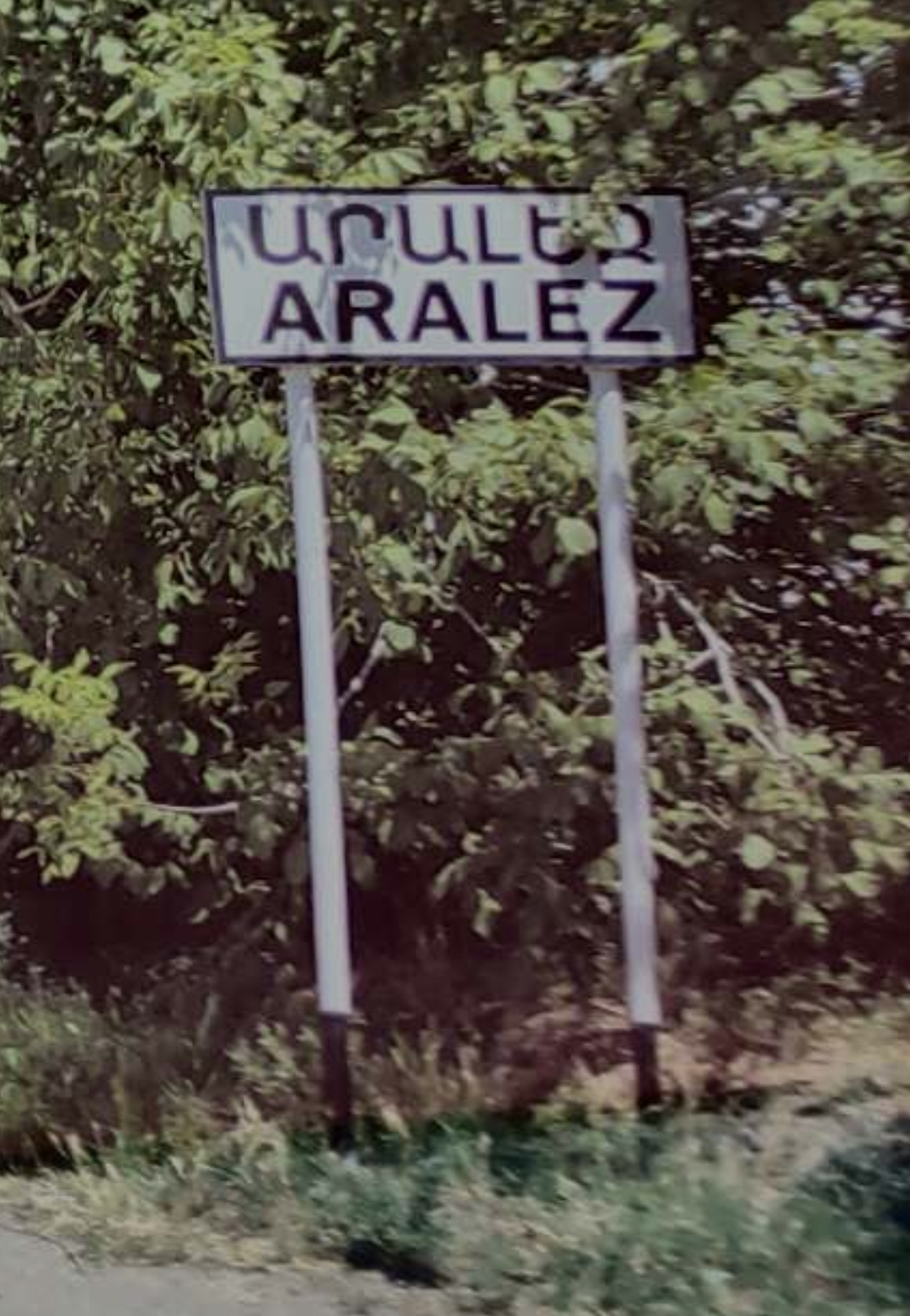
Village entrance sign

Aralez (Armenian: Արալեզ) is a village in the Vedi Municipality of the Ararat Province of Armenia.
