= Mollakənd, Lankaran =

Mollakənd
- Location within Azerbaijan
- Coordinates: 38°43′N 48°44′E
- Country: Azerbaijan
- Rayon: Lankaran
- Municipality: Rvo
- Time zone: UTC+4 (AZT)
  - Summer (DST): UTC+5 (AZT)

Mollakənd (also, Mollakend) is a village in the Lankaran Rayon of Azerbaijan. The village forms part of the municipality of Rvo.
