= Əngəxaran =

- Municipality
- Location within Azerbaijan
- Coordinates: 40°40′20″N 48°39′16″E
- Country: Azerbaijan
- Rayon: Shamakhi

Population
  - Total: 856
- Time zone: UTC+4 (AZT)
  - Summer (DST): UTC+5 (AZT)

Əngəxaran (also Angekharan and Engekharan) is a village and municipality in the Shamakhi Rayon of Azerbaijan. It has a population of 856, known locally for its mineral springs. The name of the village is thought to mean place where bees are kept, Əng meaning bee and -an being a place suffix in the Tat language.
