= Metsamor (village) =

Village in Armavir, Armenia

Metsamor Մեծամոր
- Location within Armenia
- Coordinates: 40°04′17″N 44°17′21″E
- Country: Armenia
- Marz (Province): Armavir Province

Population (2011)
  - Total: 1,322
- Time zone: UTC+4 ( )

Metsamor (Armenian: Մեծամոր) is a village in the Armavir Province of Armenia.

== See also ==
- Armavir Province
