= Mollakənd, Kurdamir =

Mollakənd
- Municipality
- Location within Azerbaijan
- Coordinates: 40°07′20″N 48°06′05″E
- Country: Azerbaijan
- Rayon: Kurdamir
- Time zone: UTC+4 (AZT)
  - Summer (DST): UTC+5 (AZT)

Mollakənd (Also known as, Mollakend, Mollakand Mollakent, Моллакенд and Mulla) is a village and municipality in the Kurdamir Rayon of Azerbaijan.
