= Erivan Gymnasium =

- Russian: Эриванская гимназия Armenian: Երևանի գիմնազիա
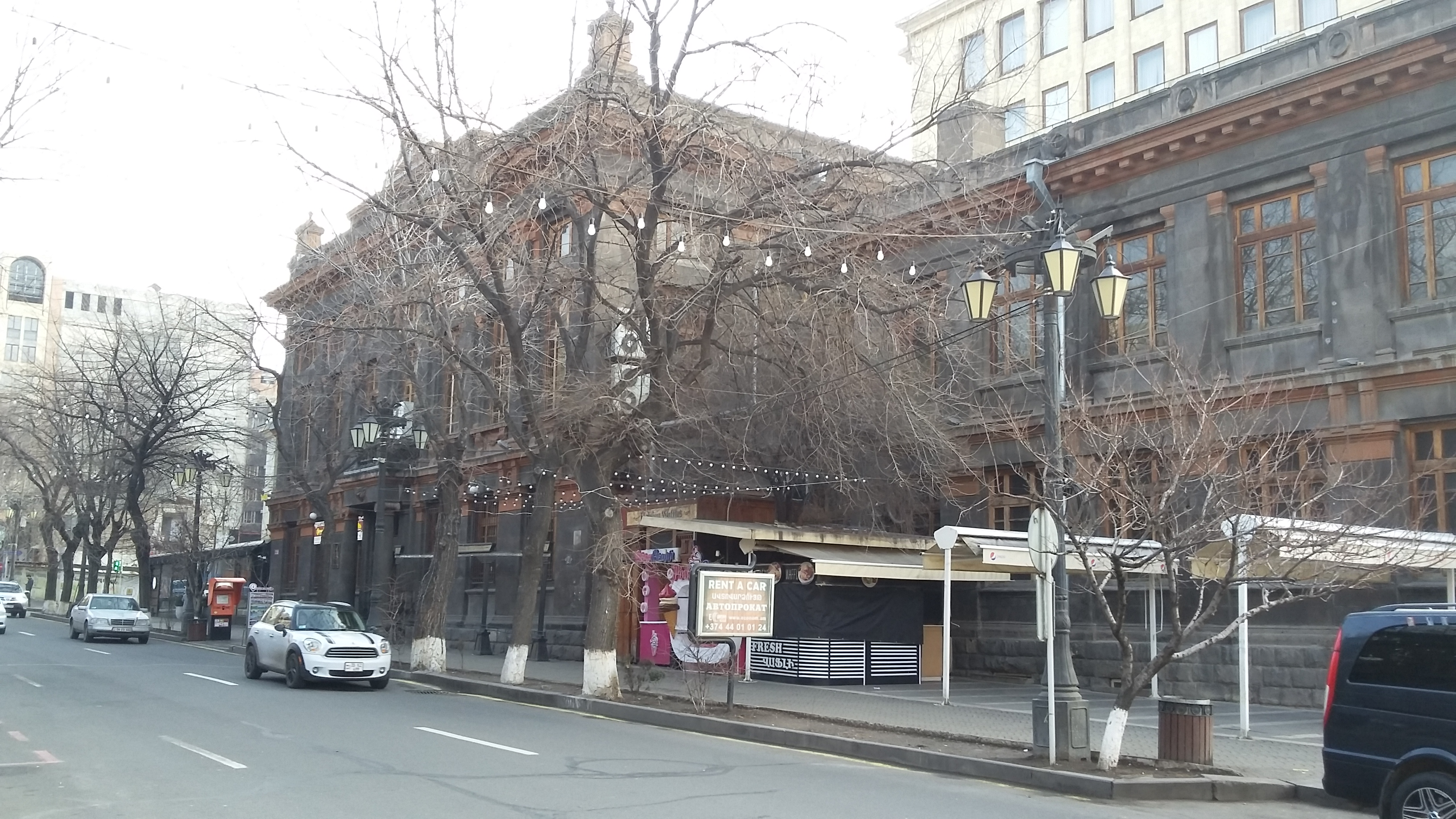
- Modern view of the building where the gymnasium is located
- Erivan; Armenia

Information
- Former name: Erivan uezd school Erivan progymnasium
- Established: 14 January 1832
- Closed: 1919

Erivan male gymnasium (Armenian: Երևանի գիմնազիա; Russian: Эриванская гимназия) was opened on January 14, 1832, as an Erivan uezd school, in 1869 it became a progymnasium, and on March 31, 1881, it became a gymnasium.
