= Metekhi Church =

Church in Tbilisi, Georgia

Coordinates: 41°41′24″N 44°48′40″E

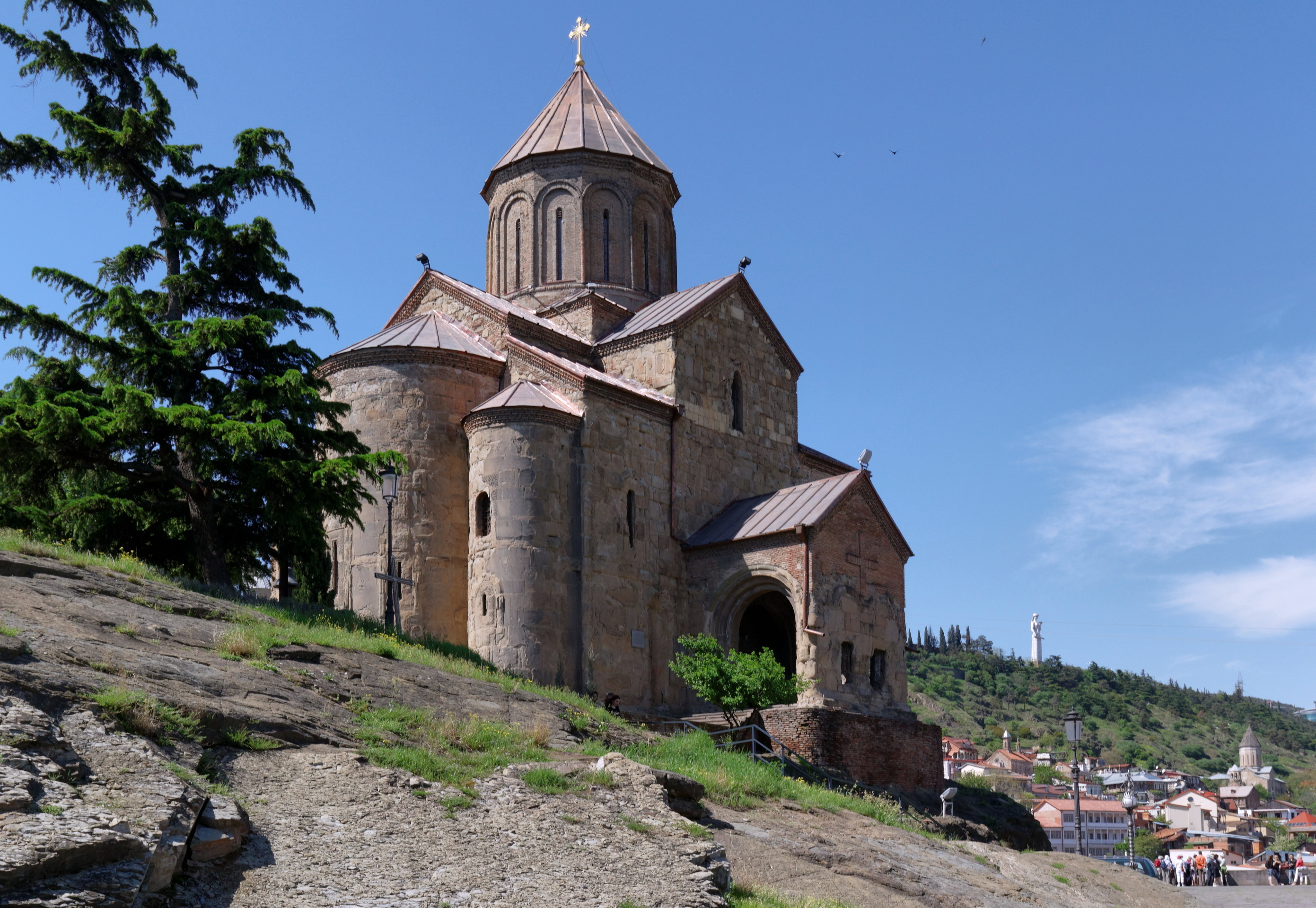
View of Metekhi from the northeast, with parts of Tbilisi's Old Town seen on the horizon.

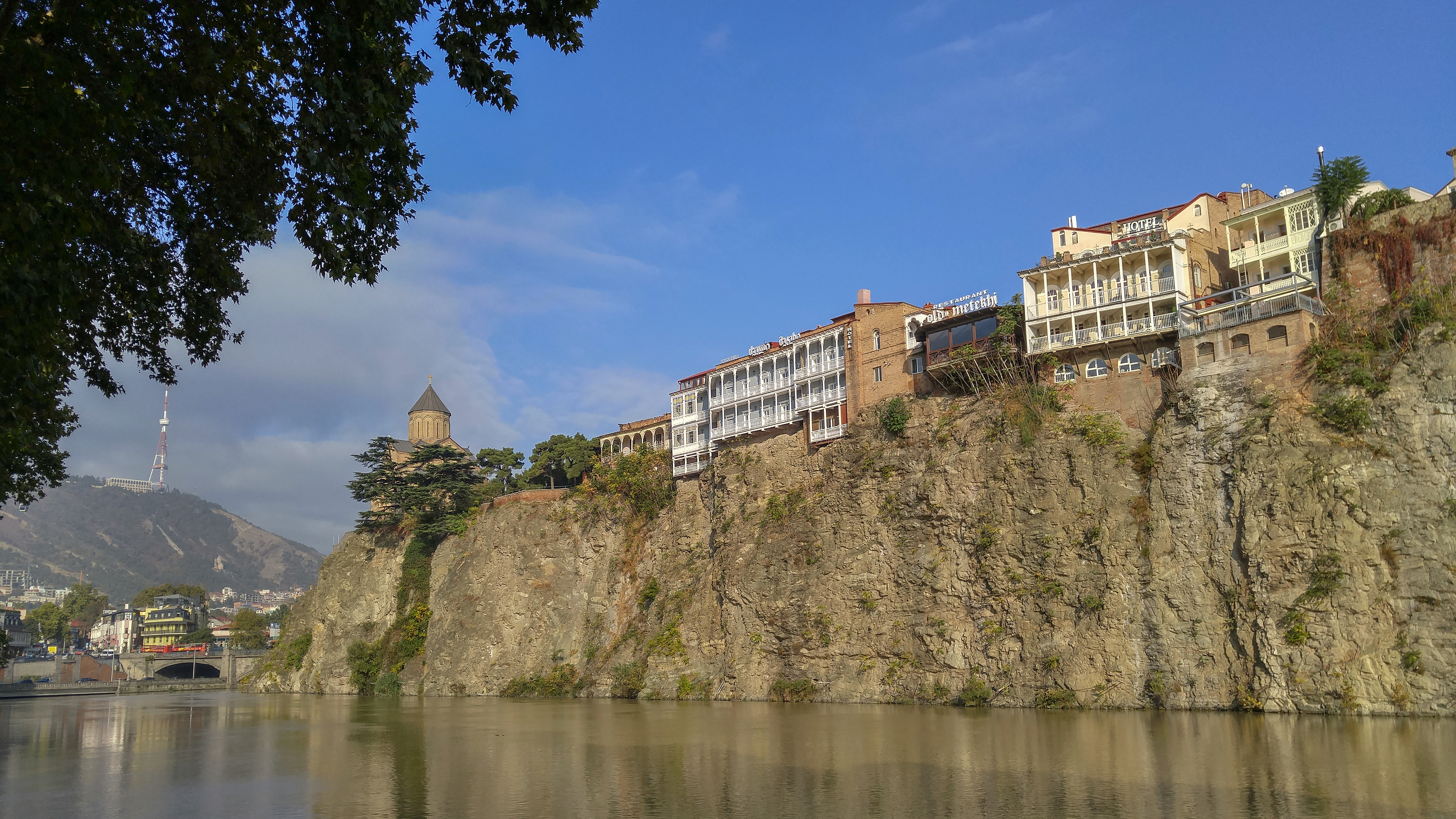
The dome of Metekhi peaking from the left end of the cliff

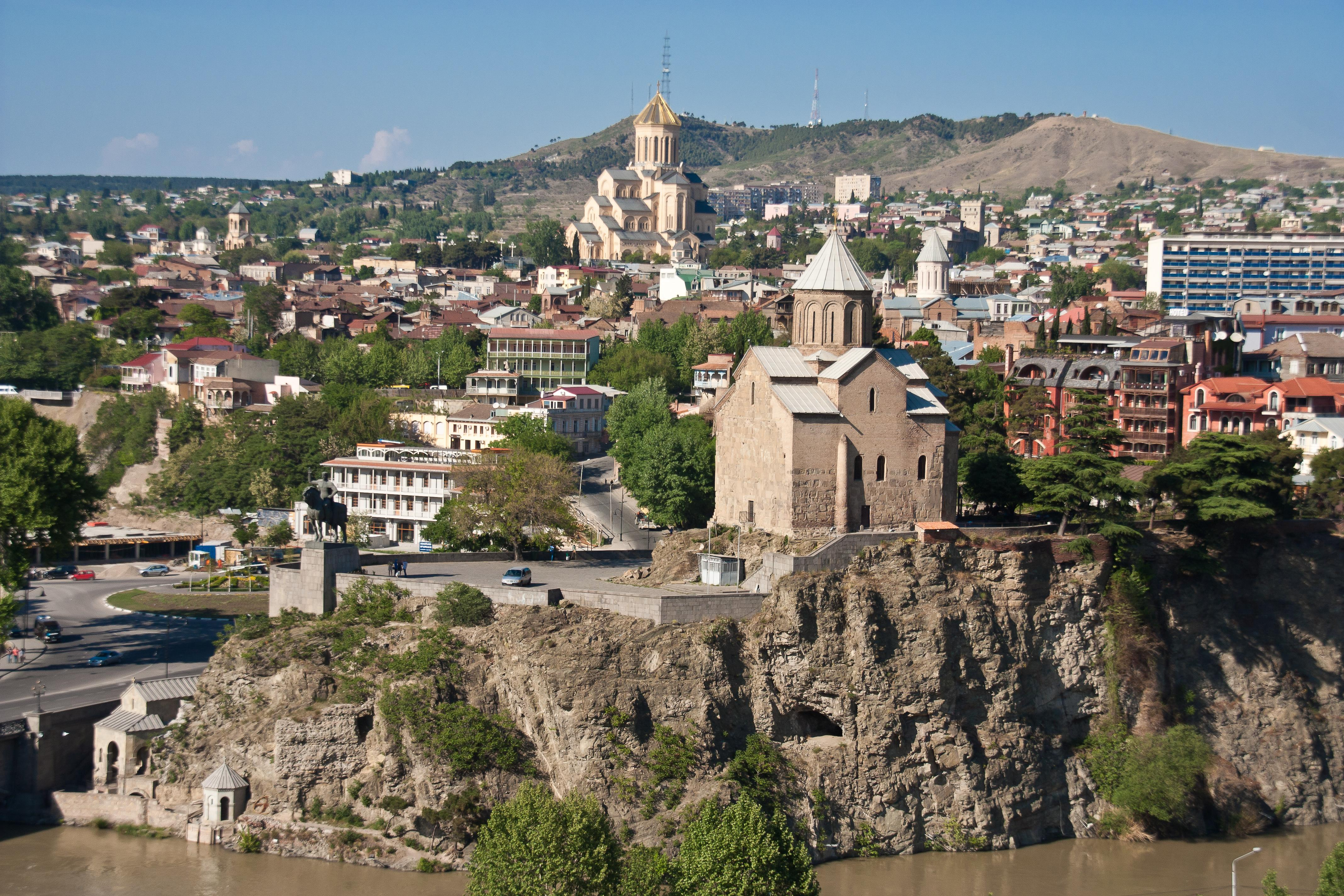
Metekhi as viewed from Narikala

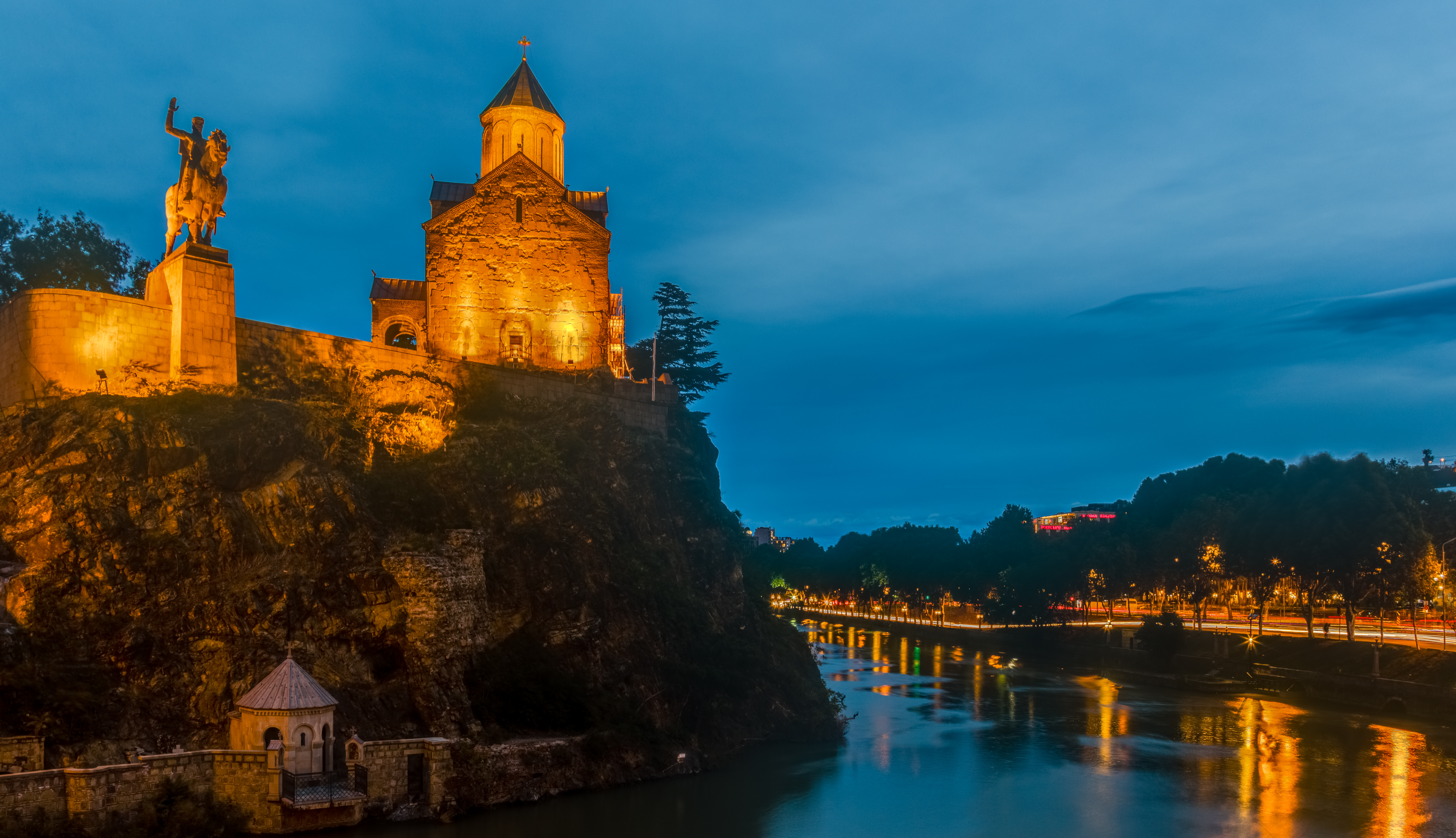
Metekhi church at night.

The Metekhi church of the Nativity of the Mother of God (Georgian: მეტეხის ღვთისმშობლის შობის ტაძარი, romanized: met'ekhis ghvtismshoblis shobis t'adzari), known simply as Metekhi, is a Georgian Orthodox Christian church located on the left bank of the river Kura. It sits on the Metekhi Cliff opposite the old town of Tbilisi, Georgia. Much of the existing structure dates back to the Middle Ages and was built between 1278 and 1289 AD under the reign of King Demetrius II of Georgia, although oral tradition traces Metekhi's origins further to the 5th century.

== Description ==
Following a tradition in Georgian architecture of harmonious relationship of temples with the surrounding natural landscape, Metekhi Church was built to look like a growing continuation of the cliff, visible from many city points. The cross-in-square church occupies an area of 20 × 16 meters and is somewhat prolonged vertically. Eastern facade has three convex apses, with central apse being the largest. Nothing similar is known among the churches of 11-13th centuries, which makes it rather unique. The dome with tholobate is internally held by four pillars, which is also a more archaic feature (two pillars after 11th century), as well as semicircular projections on pillars. They were renovated in 16-17th centuries.

Pointed arches under the dome date back to the 16-17th centuries. The tholobate was damaged by lightning in the 17th century and restored in 18th. The church has a portal on the northern side, with stairs and entrance from the east. The portal also had a western entrance, which is no longer in existence. Position of the portal in the central part of the wall, rather than in the western part, is also not typical for the 11th-12th century architecture.

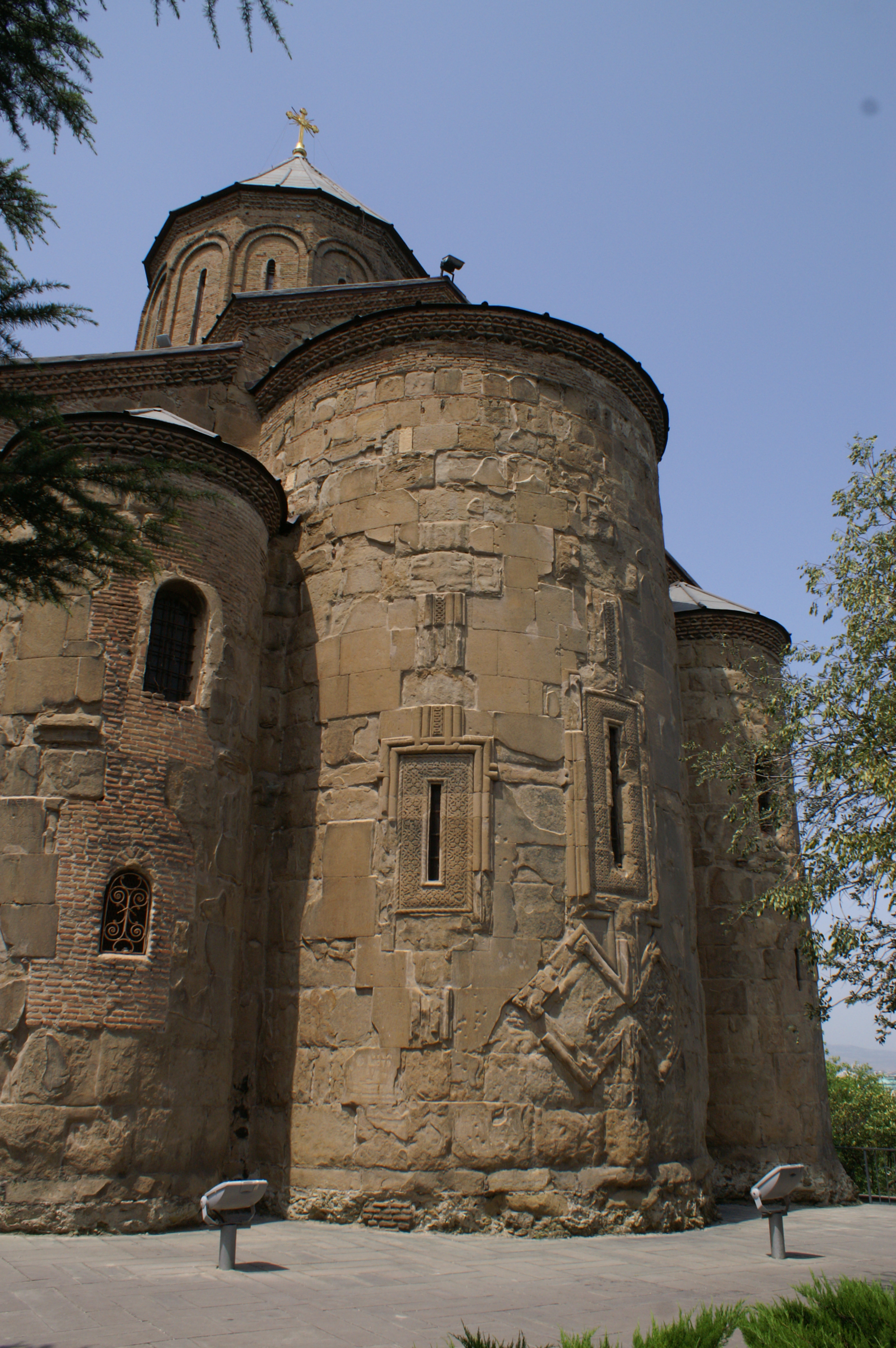
The eastern facade with three convex apses

The walls are made of hewn quadras, not preserved on the southern facade, where they were substituted by bricks in 18th century. Original walls remain on the east and north sides, lower part of the west and eastern part of south side. The entrance on the southern wall was also created in 18th century.

Exterior decorations of the church, traditional Georgian rock carvings, are characteristic for the Georgian Golden Age of 11th-12th centuries. The most well-preserved eastern facade with three apses, and northern facade with the portal contain decorative rock engravings. Rhombic rosettes and convex architraves are the motives commonly used in church decorations of that period. However, also characteristic architecture is missing except for portal passages. Architrave of the central apse has an ornamented cross. Decorations are generally disconnected, rather schematic and miniaturised, which are the characteristics of 13th century style.

Interior murals were not preserved. Among various icons one, called "100000 martyrs", tells about a tragic event that took place in Tbilisi in 1226. The town was taken over by troops of Kwarazm-shah, Jalal ad-Din. He ordered that icons from Sioni church were dropped on Metekhi Bridge, and Tbilisi citizens to step on them or beheaded. Church tradition tells about 100,000 inhabitants, who disobeyed and were executed. Their heads were floating downstream of Mtkvari River.

== History ==
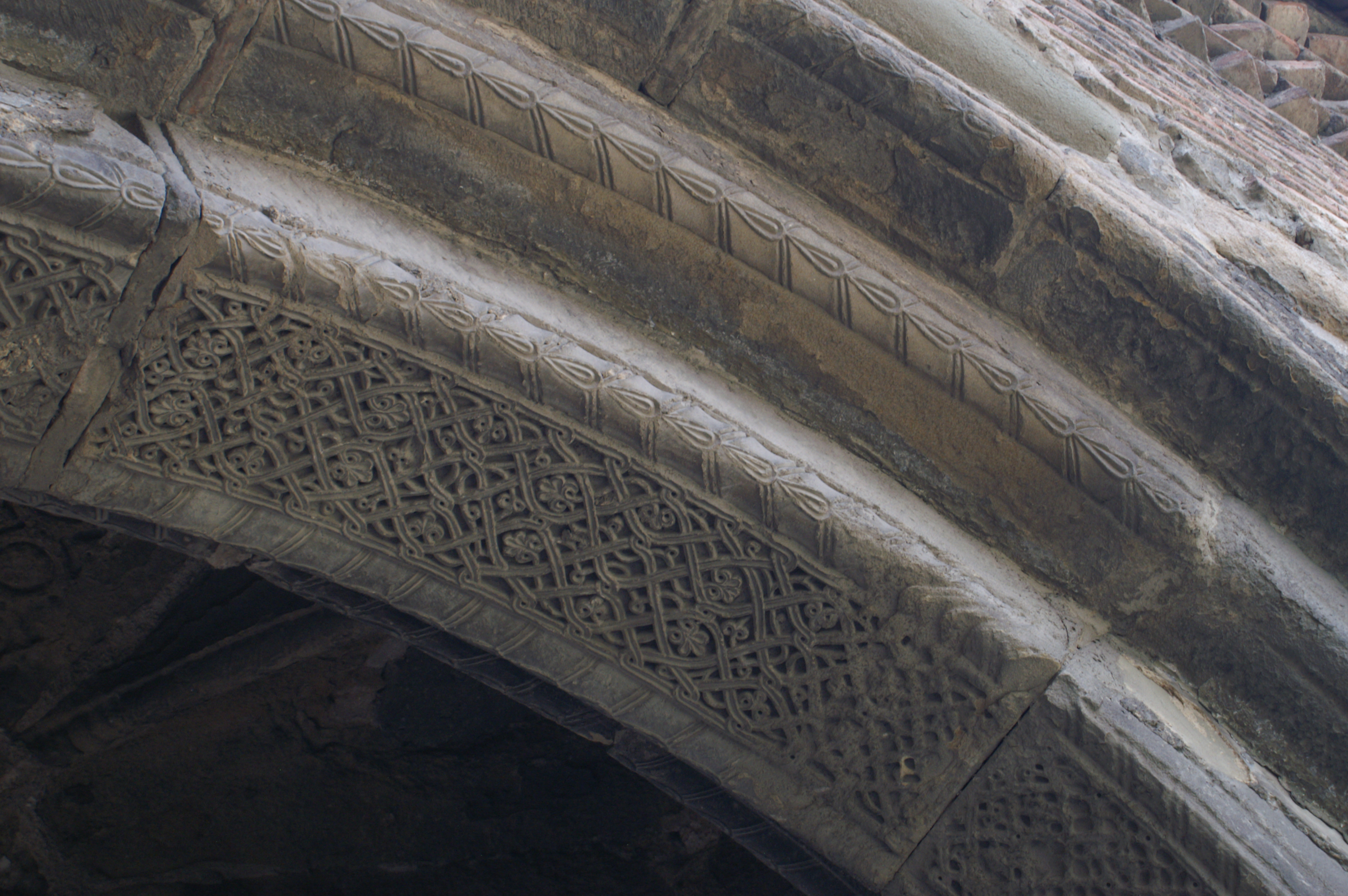
Carvings on the portal arch of the church

Oral tradition attributes construction of the church to the King Vakhtang I Gorgasali in the 5th century, who erected it as his court church, or to his son Dachi in the 6th century, although neither archeological nor written evidence exist about this. Same tradition places the tomb of St. Shushanik into the church sacristy. But no studies confirmed that yet. Some 19th century authors even mention exact year, 455, when the church was founded by Vakhtang I.

The name "Metekhi" was first time mentioned in the Georgian medieval chronicles Kartlis Tskhovreba in connection with suppression of the rebellion against King Demetrius I in 1132 (or 1145), and execution of eristavi Ivane Abuletisdze, who was buried in "Metekhi". It is though unclear, which particular church is mentioned. Except for Tbilisi, a church of Assumption is also found in a small village named Metekhi.

The second mention is concerned with the Battle of Shamkor in 1195, when Queen Tamar, after sending troops, "...took off her shoes and arrived barefeet to the Church of Assumption in Metekhi". By the fact that royal palace was in Tbilisi, it is often supposed that Metekhi Church was already there in the end of 12th century. Meanwhile, other facts from Kartlis Tskhovreba further confuse the situation. The troops before leaving for the battle were gathered in "Somkhiti", that is Kvemo Kartli region, and Tamar was present there. After sending the troops she walked to the church back in Tbilisi, which would be impossible to do barefeet. Further, it is said that she "went to the Church of Assumption in Vardzia and prayed before the Virgin Mary of Vardzia... and sent troops from Vardzia, standing there herself barefeet...".

If Metekhi Church was there, it was destroyed in 1235 during the invasion of the Mongols, and rebuilt some time between 1278 and 1289, under the reign of Demetrius II. The third mention in The Georgian Chronicles tells that "The king... built a monastery in Isani Palace for the Virgin Mary of Metekhi." Isani was the original name of a neighbourhood on left bank of Mtkvari River on high cliff that hosted royal palace, and thus this is the earliest clear mention of presence of monastery in Tbilisi on Metekhi Cliff. At least until the end of 14th century the area surrounding the monastery was still covered by forests, which is concluded from 1398 charter of Metekhi church: "... A monastery of the Virgin Mary Metekhi in Avlabari, with its manor and Avlabari forests belonging to it."

During the reign of Vakhtang V, in 1658, the church became a storage for gunpowder. The monastery was abandoned in the same century. Its first depiction also comes from the same time by French traveller Jean Chardin (1671).

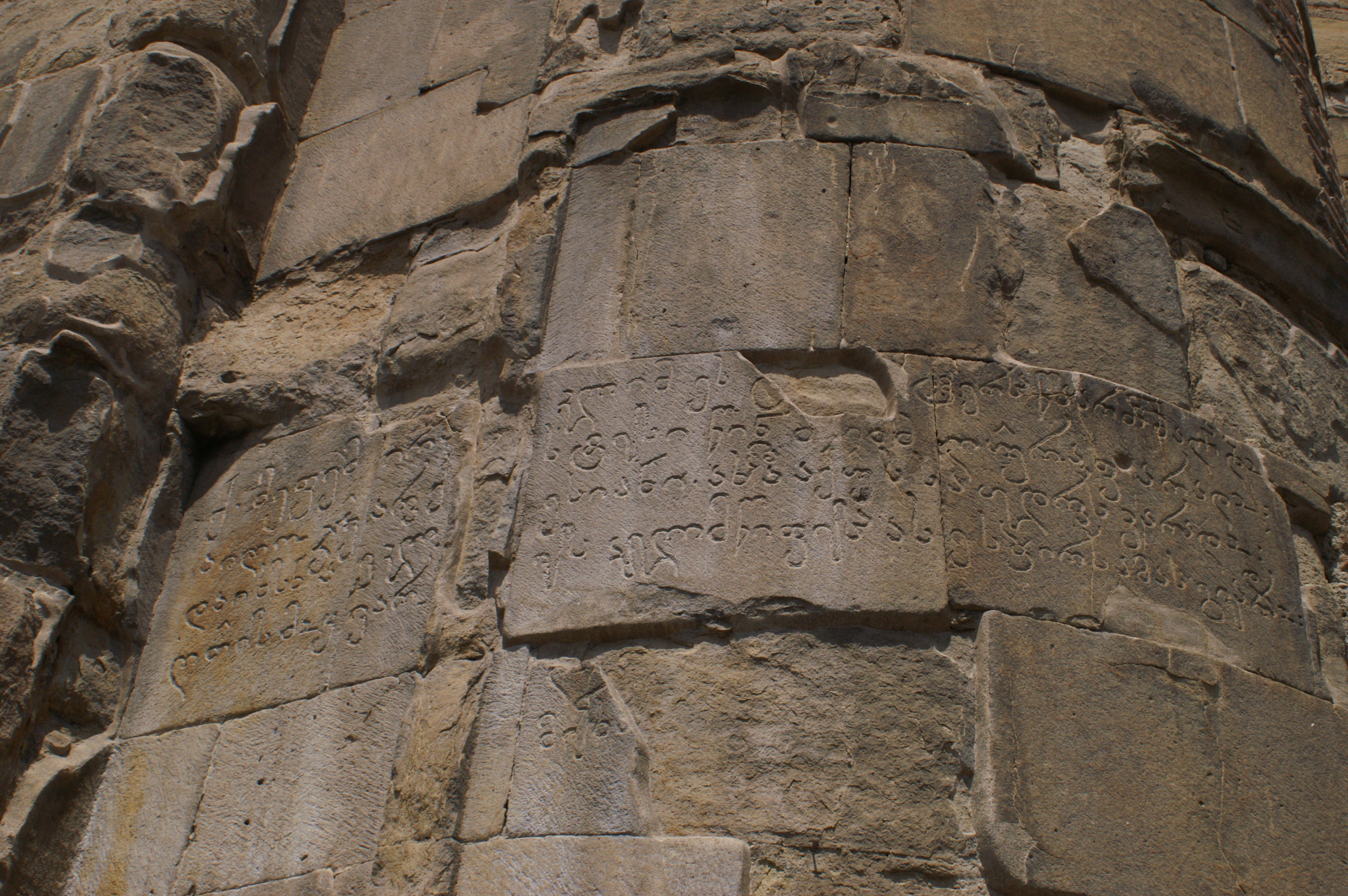
Carved writing on the southern facade of the church, mentioning the King Erekle II.

The fortress together with the church were retaken from Turks by Heraclius II in 1748. Carving on southern facade tells about this event: "The King Erekle II forcely took this fortress from enemy, led by the Christ's Cross like a shield. Having the church freed, he turned it into his court church. Such are the deeds of Christ loving king. In glory of the God and to the King Erekle."

After Georgia was included into the Russian Empire, the fortress became a prison, and prisoners scratched their names on the church facade.

In the beginning of Soviet era, in 1921, NKVD camp was on the place. Executions of prisoners were regularly committed here. Fortifications were destroyed in 1937, and the church was also planned to be demolished, but managed to survive due to local protest. In 1940-60s, the church functioned as a depository for collections of the National Museum of Art, and entire eastern part of the interior was separated by thick wall. In 1974, the wall was demolished and the church was made a youth theater. It had a backstage in southern part of interior, a stage under the dome, surrounded by amphitheater with 100 seats. Finally, the church was returned to worship in 1988.

First comprehensive measurements and quality drawings and photographs of the church were made by a group of scientists, led by Vakhtang Beridze in 1942 and subsequent years. The results, including description of church history and analysis, were compiled in a monograph by Beridze et al. (1969).

== See also ==
- Sioni Cathedral
- Anchiskhati Basilica
- Sameba Cathedral
