= Nargiz Pashayeva =

Azerbaijani philologist

- Nərgiz Arif qızı Paşayeva
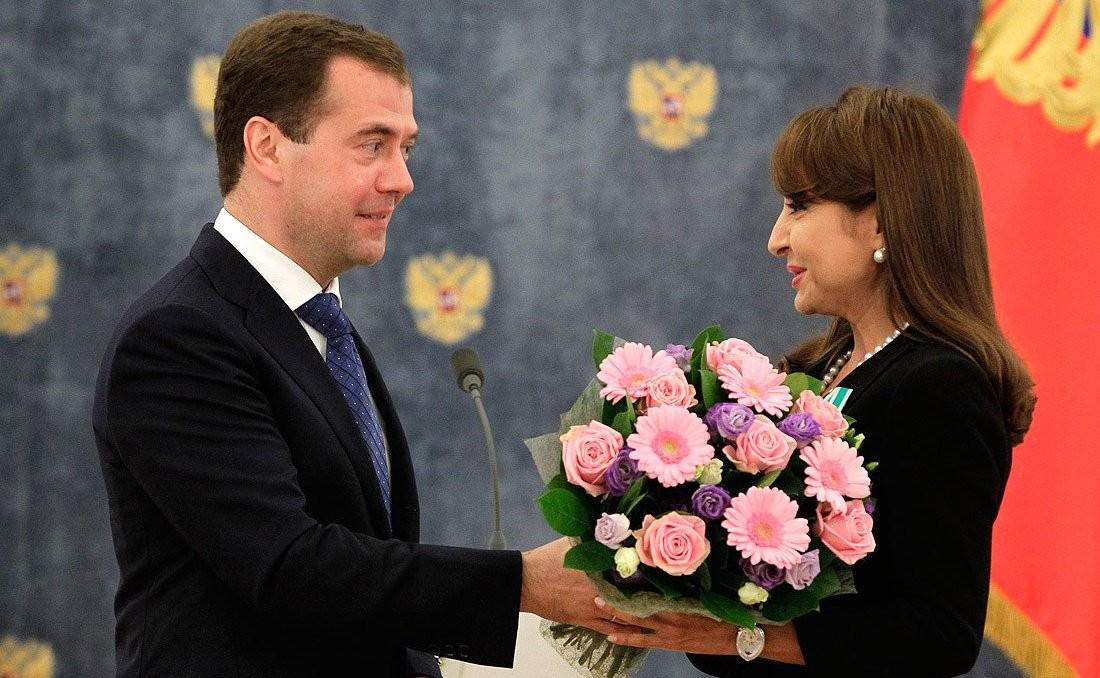
- Dmitry Medvedev presents the Order of Friendship to Nargiz Pashayeva in June 2011.
- Born: December 13, 1962 (age 63); Baku, Azerbaijan SSR, USSR
- Citizenship: Azerbaijan
- Education: Baku State University Faculty of Philology (1978-1983)
- Spouse: Altai Sadiqzadeh
- Children: Aida Mahmudova; Ulviyya Mahmudova
- Awards
- Scientific career
- Fields: philology, literary criticism
- Workplaces: Lomonosov Moscow State University`s Baku branch
- Thesis: Artistic aesthetic perception of the person in modern Azerbaijani literature (2004)

Nargiz Arif gizi Pashayeva (Azerbaijani: Nərgiz Arif qızı Paşayeva; born December 13, 1962) is an Honored Scientist of Azerbaijan, Honorary member of ANAS (since May 2, 2017), vice-president of ANAS (since June 8, 2018), Doctor of Philology, rector of the Lomonosov Moscow State University's Baku branch.

== Early life and career ==
Nargiz Pashayeva was born on December 15, 1962, in Baku. From 1968 to 1978 she studied at the secondary specialized music school named after Bulbul. In 1983, she graduated from the faculty of philology of Baku State University with honors. At the same time, she entered the postgraduate study and successfully completed her thesis and defended dissertation on "Sabir's Innovation".

On September 23, 1987, she was awarded the degree of candidate of Philological sciences. Then Pashayeva began working at the same faculty as an assistant, lecturer, head lecturer, and finally docent. In 2004, she successfully defended her doctoral thesis on the topic "Artistic aesthetic perception of the person in modern Azerbaijani literature" (based on the creativity of People's Writer Elchin Afandiyev). Afterwards on February 11, 2005, Pashayeva was awarded the degree of Doctor of Philology, and on March 30, 2005, she was awarded the title of professor. In 2006–2008, she worked as a Vice Rector of International Relations at Baku State University. Since 2006, Pashayeva is a Chairman of the Dissertation Council.

Pashayeva is also a member of the Union of Azerbaijani Writers since 2007. On June 23, 2008, Pashayeva was appointed the Rector of the Baku Branch of the Moscow State University. Her main activity is related with this educational establishment.

On February 27, 2019, Pashayeva was elected academician (foreign member) of the Russian Academy of Education on the recommendation of academician Viktor Sadovnichiy.

== Personal life ==
Nargiz Pashayeva is from one of the most prominent and popular families in Azerbaijan. So that her grandfather was the noted Iranian-born Azerbaijani writer Mir Jalal Pashayev. Her uncle Hafiz Pashayev was Azerbaijan's first Ambassador to the United States and the founding rector of the ADA University. Pashayeva's father Arif Pashayev is the Rector of the National Aviation Academy in Baku, and her mother, Aida Imanguliyeva (1939–1992) was a prominent philologist and Arabist, daughter of the prominent journalist and pedagogue Nasir Imanguliyev. Furthermore, her sister is the current First Lady of the Republic of Azerbaijan, Mehriban Aliyeva.

She married Altai Sadiqzadeh, an Azerbaijani artist. Her daughter Aida Mahmudova is also an artist and supporter of contemporary art.

== Awards ==
- On June 20, 2011, she was awarded Order of Friendship of the Russian Federation.
- On March 15, 2013, she was awarded the Golden Order of Merit of the European Economic Chamber of Trade, Commerce and Industry (European Economic Chamber of Trade, Commerce and Industry - EEIG).
- On May 24, 2013, she was awarded the Order of Academic Palms.
- On December 13, 2022, she was awarded the Sharaf Order for her great achievements in the development of science and education in the Republic of Azerbaijan.
