= Baku Marathon =

Runaway marathon in Baku, Azerbaijan

Baku marathon is the annual runaway half marathon which is organized in Baku, Azerbaijan.

== History ==
The Baku marathon was first held on May 1, 2016, in Baku. The initiators of the organization of the marathon were the Seaside Boulevard Office, the Heydar Aliyev Foundation, and Baku Olympic Stadium. It was organized in order to support the improvement of sport in the country, to show the importance of the healthy lifestyles, and bring people together for auspicious purposes. The 2016 Baku marathon started at the National Flag Square and finished at the Olympic Stadium. The participants ran about 21 km. Among the participants of the marathon were prominent public and political figures, athletes, etc. More than 7000 participants applied in order to participate in the 2016 Baku marathon.

Along with Azerbaijani citizens, more than 500 foreigners living and working in Azerbaijan joined the marathon. Heads and representatives of embassies of Spain, France, Kazakhstan, Ukraine, Saudi Arabia, Iran, India, the Czech Republic and other countries, students, athletes, a number of well-known social and political figures and public figures of Azerbaijan participated in the race. As well as participants from Austria, Germany, Russia, Great Britain, United Arab Emirates, Kenya and other countries also joined the marathon.

In addition, open fan-zones for all, as well as a number of entertaining programs were organized along the route. Different entertainments such as lottery, mini-football, animators and concerts were held. Each visitor had the opportunity to meet the winners and congratulate them.

== Awards ==
The medal awarding ceremony usually takes place at the Baku Olympic Stadium. Awards are granted in 2 categories: the first three places among men and women.

Baku marathon for the second time was held on April 30, 2017. The Olympic champion, world champion on stand-by shooting Zemfira Meftahatdinova fired the starting shot. The race marathon distance was 21 kilometers (about 4 hours 30 minutes).

The 2016 and 2017 Baku marathons were held in Baku under the slogan "Win the Wind". The third marathon race was held on May 13, 2018, in Baku.

In May 2024, more than 15,000 attendees are to attend the marathon.

== See also ==
- Official Webpage
- Heydar Aliyev Foundation
- Leyla Aliyeva
