= Heydar Aliyev Jr. =

Son of President of Azerbaijan

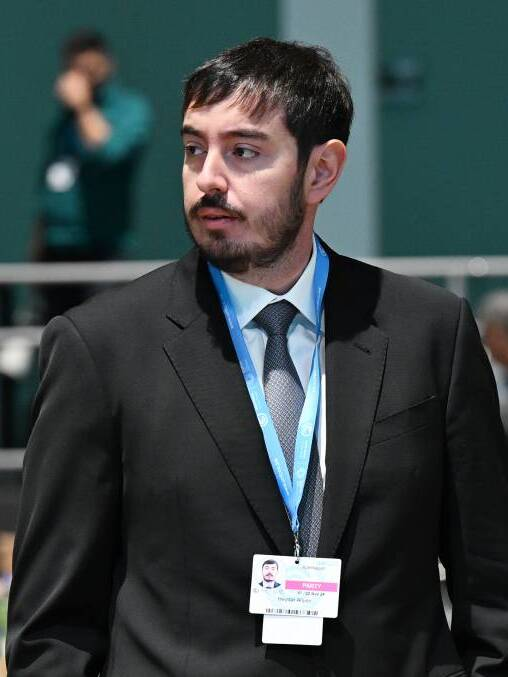
- Aliyev Jr. at the 2024 United Nations Climate Change Conference
- Born: 3 August 1997 (age 29)
- Education: ADA University
- Spouse: Alena Aliyeva (m. 2022)
- Parent(s): Ilham Aliyev (father); Mehriban Aliyeva (mother)
- Relatives: Aliyev family: Heydar Aliyev (grandfather); Zarifa Aliyeva (grandmother); Leyla Aliyeva (sister); Arzu Aliyeva (sister)

Heydar Ilham oghlu Aliyev (Note: Azerbaijani: Heydər İlham oğlu Əliyev) (born 3 August 1997) is the youngest child and only son of the incumbent President of Azerbaijan, Ilham Aliyev, and his wife, incumbent Vice President Mehriban Aliyeva.

== Life and education ==
Heydar Aliyev Jr. was born on 3 August 1997 as the youngest and the only son to Ilham Aliyev and Mehriban Aliyeva. He was named after his grandfather, Heydar Aliyev, who was serving as the 3rd President of Azerbaijan at that time. He has two elder sisters — Leyla and Arzu.

In 2010, The Dallas Morning News reported that Aliyev owned 9 waterfront mansions in Palm Jumeirah, Dubai, United Arab Emirates since 2009. Government officials of Azerbaijan, however, had no comment when the Texas-based newspaper contacted them.

Aliyev attended ADA University where he obtained a bachelor's degree in 2017. He then served national service from 2018 to 2019.

== Possible succession ==
In 2016, a referendum for the constitutional amendment was passed, which included the removal of the age limit for presidency, as well as the adoption of the vice presidency, where Ilham's wife, Mehriban, was appointed. According to some critics, these moves were in order to paving a way for Heydar, who was then 19 years old, to succeed his father.

== Personal life ==
On 26 November 2022, Mehriban posted a photo on Instagram celebrating Heydar's marriage, although the post did not mention the name of his spouse. It was later revealed that he was married to Alena Aliyeva. The couple's relationship and marriage were subsequently confirmed by multiple sources.
