= Latafat Gardashova =

Azerbaijani computer scientist

- Lətafət Qardaşova Abbas qızı
- Born: January 27, 1966 (age 60); Zaqatala, Azerbaijan SSR, Soviet Union
- Awards: 100th Anniversary of Azerbaijan Democratic Republic (1918–2018), Honored Scientist of the Republic of Azerbaijan
- Scientific career
- Fields: Soft computing, fuzzy logic, computational intelligence, artificial intelligence, Z-numbers
- Institutions: Azerbaijan State Oil and Industry University
- Thesis: Decision making management systems of oil refinery enterprise under fuzzy environment

Latafat Gardashova (Azerbaijani: Qardaşova Lətafət Abbas qızı; born January 27, 1966) is an Azerbaijani computer scientist. She is a Honored Scientist of the Republic of Azerbaijan, Doctor of Technical Sciences, Professor, Vice-Rector for Scientific Affairs. of the Azerbaijan State Oil and Industry University She is the author of 3 monographs, 185 scientific articles, 18 subject programs, 2 textbooks, 17 teaching aids, and also she is the scientific editor of 8 books. She is a member of the New Azerbaijan Party.

== Life and activities ==
Doctor of Technical Sciences (Doctor of Sciences in Engineering): In 2014, she defended her doctor of sciences dissertation on the topic "Decision making management systems of oil refinery enterprise under fuzzy environment" in the specialty of 3338.01-"System analysis, control, and information processing (control and decision-making)", and received the scientific degree of Doctor of Technical Sciences. Later, the scientific title of professor was awarded to her in 2023.

== Work experience ==
- From June 19, 2021 until now – Vice-Rector for Scientific Affairs of the Azerbaijan State Oil and Industry University.

== Awards and honors ==
- 2016 – Scientist of the Year Award and Medal of Honor, Science Development Foundation under the President of the Republic of Azerbaijan
- 2020 – Honorary title and medal of "Honored Scientist of the Republic of Azerbaijan".

== Books ==
- Principles of decision making and control under uncertainty. Baku: "Nargiz", 1999, 152 p. (in Russian).
- The decision making and control under uncertainty. Baku: "Nargiz", 2003, 214 p. (in Azerbaijani).
- Computer mathematics. Baku: "ASOA" publ. ,2010, 188 pp. (in Azerbaijani).
- Fuzzy logic and soft computing. Baku: "ASOA" publ. , 2010, 124 pp. (in Azerbaijani and Russian).
- Processing of signals in computer engineering. Baku: "ASOA" publ. , 2013, 353 pp. (in Azerbaijani).
- Digital signal and image processing. Baku: "ASOA" publ. , 2012, 145 pp. (in Azerbaijani).
- Decision-making methods in the fuzzy environment (monography). Baku: "ASOA" publ. , 2010, 371 pp. (in Azerbaijani).
- Knowledge Engineering, Baku, ASOIU publishing house, 260 p. 2023 (in English).
- Fuzzy logic and its application (monograph), 2023, 422 p. (in English).

== Selected articles ==
- Aliev, Rafik A.; Aliyev, B. F.; Gardashova, Latafat A.; Huseynov, Oleg H. (April 2012). "Selection of an Optimal Treatment Method for Acute Periodontitis Disease". Journal of Medical Systems. 36 (2): 639–646. doi:10.1007/s10916-010-9528-6. ISSN 0148-5598. PMID 20703669.
- "Decision Making Under Uncertainty-Proof of Ellsberg's Experiment" (PDF).
- Gardashova, L. A. (2016), "Modeling of Decision Maker Under Imperfect Information", in Zadeh, Lotfi A.; Abbasov, Ali M.; Yager, Ronald R.; Shahbazova, Shahnaz N. (eds.), Recent Developments and New Direction in Soft-Computing Foundations and Applications, Studies in Fuzziness and Soft Computing, vol. 342, Cham: Springer International Publishing, pp. 503–513, doi:10.1007/978-3-319-32229-2_35, ISBN 978-3-319-32227-8
1. Application of operational approaches to solving decision making problem using Z-numbers. Applied Mathematics, USA, 2014.
- Gardashova, Latafat A. (2014). "Application of DEO Method to Solving Fuzzy Multiobjective Optimal Control Problem". Applied Computational Intelligence and Soft Computing. 2014: 1–7. doi:10.1155/2014/971894. ISSN 1687-9724.
- Eyupoglu, Serife Z.; Gardashova, Latafat A.; Allahverdiyev, Rashad A.; Saner, T. (2016). "Application of Fuzzy Logic in Job Satisfaction Performance Problem". Procedia Computer Science. 102: 190–197. doi:10.1016/j.procs.2016.09.388.
- Ilhan, Umit; Gardashova, Latafat; Kilic, Kenan (2016). "UAV Using Dec-POMDP Model for Increasing the Level of Security in the Company". Procedia Computer Science. 102: 458–464. doi:10.1016/j.procs.2016.09.427.
- Musayev, Akif; Uzelaltinbulat, Selin; Mammadova, Samira; Gardashova, Latafat; Musayeva, Aygun (2017). "Estimation of impact of the changes made to the tax legislation to the tax receipts through fuzzy numbers". Procedia Computer Science. 120: 333–340. doi:10.1016/j.procs.2017.11.247.
- Mirzakhanov, Vuqar; Gardashova, Latafat (2019-01-02). "Modification of the Wu-Mendel approach for linguistic summarization". Journal of Experimental & Theoretical Artificial Intelligence. 31 (1): 77–97. Bibcode:2019JETAI..31...77M. doi:10.1080/0952813X.2018.1518998. ISSN 0952-813X.
- Aliyarov, Yusif R.; Gardashova, Latafat A.; Ahmadov, Shamil A. (2019), "Fuzzy Expert System for Rectal Cancer", in Aliev, Rafik A.; Kacprzyk, Janusz; Pedrycz, Witold; Jamshidi, Mo. (eds.), 13th International Conference on Theory and Application of Fuzzy Systems and Soft Computing — ICAFS-2018, vol. 896, Cham: Springer International Publishing, pp. 160–166, doi:10.1007/978-3-030-04164-9_23, ISBN 978-3-030-04163-2
- Gardashova, Latafat A. (2019), "Z-Number Based TOPSIS Method in Multi-Criteria Decision Making", in Aliev, Rafik A.; Kacprzyk, Janusz; Pedrycz, Witold; Jamshidi, Mo. (eds.), 13th International Conference on Theory and Application of Fuzzy Systems and Soft Computing — ICAFS-2018, Advances in Intelligent Systems and Computing, vol. 896, Cham: Springer International Publishing, pp. 42–50, doi:10.1007/978-3-030-04164-9_10, ISBN 978-3-030-04163-2
- Mirzakhanov, Vugar; Gardashova, Latafat (June 2019). "Wu–Mendel Approach for Linguistic Summarization: Practical Considerations and Solutions". 2019 IEEE International Conference on Fuzzy Systems (FUZZ-IEEE). IEEE. pp. 1–8. doi:10.1109/FUZZ-IEEE.2019.8858998. ISBN 978-1-5386-1728-1.
- Gardashova, Latafat A.; Guirimov, Babek G. (2020), "Decision Making Problem of a Single Product Dynamic Macroeconomic Model on Base of Fuzzy Uncertainty", in Aliev, Rafik A.; Kacprzyk, Janusz; Pedrycz, Witold; Jamshidi, Mo (eds.), 10th International Conference on Theory and Application of Soft Computing, Computing with Words and Perceptions - ICSCCW-2019, vol. 1095, Cham: Springer International Publishing, pp. 237–245, doi:10.1007/978-3-030-35249-3_30, ISBN 978-3-030-35248-6
- Z-number based decision making. Web Conference -iRobot-2020, Webinar on Robot Intelligence Technology & Applications, UK, London, 2020.
- Aliev, Rafik A.; Gardashova, Latafat A. (2021), "Z-set Based Approach to Control System Design", in Aliev, Rafik A.; Kacprzyk, Janusz; Pedrycz, Witold; Jamshidi, Mo (eds.), 14th International Conference on Theory and Application of Fuzzy Systems and Soft Computing – ICAFS-2020, vol. 1306, Cham: Springer International Publishing, pp. 10–21, doi:10.1007/978-3-030-64058-3_2, ISBN 978-3-030-64057-6
- Gardashova, Latafat A. (2020), "Synthesis of Fuzzy Terminal Controller for Chemical Reactor of Alcohol Production", in Aliev, Rafik A.; Kacprzyk, Janusz; Pedrycz, Witold; Jamshidi, Mo (eds.), 10th International Conference on Theory and Application of Soft Computing, Computing with Words and Perceptions - ICSCCW-2019, Advances in Intelligent Systems and Computing, vol. 1095, Cham: Springer International Publishing, pp. 106–112, doi:10.1007/978-3-030-35249-3_13, ISBN 978-3-030-35248-6
- Gardashova, Latafat A. (2021), "Using Fuzzy Probabilistic Implication in Z-set Based Inference", in Aliev, Rafik Aziz; Yusupbekov, Nodirbek Rustambekovich; Kacprzyk, Janusz; Pedrycz, Witold (eds.), 11th World Conference "Intelligent System for Industrial Automation" (WCIS-2020), Advances in Intelligent Systems and Computing, vol. 1323, Cham: Springer International Publishing, pp. 33–39, doi:10.1007/978-3-030-68004-6_5, ISBN 978-3-030-68003-9
- Gardashova, L. A.; Mammadova, K. A. (2023), "Optimal Implicatıon Based Fuzzy Control System for a Steam Generator", in Aliev, R. A.; Kacprzyk, J.; Pedrycz, W.; Jamshidi, Mo. (eds.), 15th International Conference on Applications of Fuzzy Systems, Soft Computing and Artificial Intelligence Tools – ICAFS-2022, vol. 610, Cham: Springer Nature Switzerland, pp. 234–246, doi:10.1007/978-3-031-25252-5_34, ISBN 978-3-031-25251-8
- Gardashova, Latafat A. (2024), "Decision-Making on the Information Technology Investment Problem Under Z-Environment", in Aliev, Rafik A.; Kacprzyk, Janusz; Pedrycz, Witold; Jamshidi, Mo. (eds.), 16th International Conference on Applications of Fuzzy Systems, Soft Computing and Artificial Intelligence Tools – ICAFS-2023, Lecture Notes in Networks and Systems, vol. 1141, Cham: Springer Nature Switzerland, pp. 53–62, doi:10.1007/978-3-031-76283-3_10, ISBN 978-3-031-76282-6
- Gardashova, Latafat A. (2024), "University Selection by Using Z-TOPSIS Methodology", in Aliev, R. A.; Yusupbekov, Nodirbek Rustambekovich; Kacprzyk, Janusz; Pedrycz, Witold (eds.), 12th World Conference "Intelligent System for Industrial Automation" (WCIS-2022), Lecture Notes in Networks and Systems, vol. 718, Cham: Springer Nature Switzerland, pp. 11–21, doi:10.1007/978-3-031-51521-7_4, ISBN 978-3-031-51520-0
- Kosov, Pavel; El Kadhi, Nahla; Zanni-Merk, Cecilia; Gardashova, Latafat (2024). "Advancing XAI: new properties to broaden semantic-based explanations of black-box learning models". Procedia Computer Science. 246: 2292–2301. doi:10.1016/j.procs.2024.09.560.
- Kosov, Pavel; Kadhi, Nahla El; Zanni-Merk, Cecilia; Gardashova, Latafat (2024). "Semantic-Based XAI: Leveraging Ontology Properties to Enhance Explainability". 2024 International Conference on Decision Aid Sciences and Applications (DASA). pp. 1–5. doi:10.1109/DASA63652.2024.10836289. ISBN 979-8-3503-6910-6.
