= Arzu Aliyeva =

Azerbaijani public figure (born 1989)

- Arzu Əliyeva
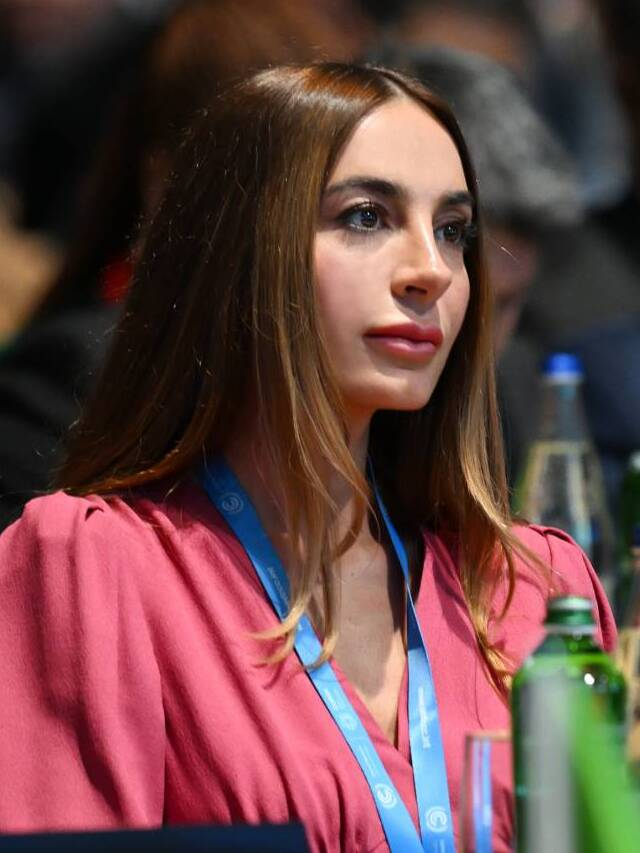
- Aliyeva at COP29 World Leaders Climate Action Summit in Baku (2024)
- Born: 23 January 1989 (age 37); Baku, Azerbaijan SSR, Soviet Union
- Occupations: Film producer, public figure
- Spouse: Samed Gurbanov (m. 2011)
- Children: 2
- Parents: Ilham Aliyev (father); Mehriban Aliyeva (mother)
- Relatives: Aliyev family: Heydar Aliyev (grandfather); Zarifa Aliyeva (grandmother); Leyla Aliyeva (sister); Heydar Aliyev Jr. (brother)

Arzu Ilham qizi Aliyeva (Azerbaijani: Arzu İlham qızı Əliyeva, born 23 January 1989) is an Azerbaijani public figure who is the younger daughter of Ilham Aliyev, the president of Azerbaijan.

Aliyeva and her family have substantial wealth stashed in elaborate networks of offshore companies. She and her sister Leyla Aliyeva own Azerfon, one of the largest mobile operators in Azerbaijan through three Panamanian offshore companies. Offshore companies owned by the sisters were also awarded mining rights worth billions of dollars by the Azerbaijan government. They also own PASHA Holding, a conglomerate that has been embroiled in high-level corruption.

== Early life ==
Arzu Aliyeva was born on 23 January 1989, in Baku, then Azerbaijan SSR, USSR. She attended high school number 160 in Baku and was also educated in Switzerland and Great Britain, together with her older sister Leyla.

== Career ==
=== Business career ===
She is a member of the ruling Aliyev family in Azerbaijan. She was embroiled in scandals involving the family's wealth, as she and her family members had wealth stashed in elaborate networks of offshore companies. The documents showed that Arzu and her sister Leyla controlled two previously hidden British Virgin Islands-incorporated firms — Kingsview Developments Limited and Exaltation Limited. Documents have also shown her to be the owner of the offshore company Arbor Investments.

In 2005, Ilham Aliyev's regime granted license for a new mobile operator, Azerfon, to enter the Azerbaijani market. In 2011, investigative reporting revealed that Arzu Aliyeva and her sister Leyla owned 72% of the operator through three Panamanian offshore companies.

In 2006, Ilham Aliyev awarded mining rights for six gold fields worth billions of dollars to a four-company consortium owned by his daughters through offshore companies. The contract did not follow normal bidding procedures, the identity of the consortium owners was unknown, and the consortium had no history of mining. Over the course of several years, the consortium failed to make profits, as the secretive ownership structure inhibited the companies' ability to sell on the world market. The consortium unsuccessfully sought to sell itself to a private buyer. In 2016, their father Ilham Aliyev ordered the state-owned company Azergold (formed in 2015) to purchase the four-company consortium. As part of the secret deal, the daughter would receive 70% of all future mining profits while the state would just receive the remaining 30%.

According to a 2010 RFE/RL report, she owns 29% of Silk Way Bank, which she acquired at the price of $7.8 million.

=== Film producer ===
In 2008, Arzu Aliyeva participated in the shooting of a promotional video clip about Azerbaijan. This video clip was shown on CNN and Euronews. She produced the documentaries "Objective: Baku. Hitler’s War On Oil” (2015) and "Son Iclas" (2018). She directed Eternal Mission” (Original: “Abadi ezamiyyat”, 2016). Aliyeva is a co-owner of Silk Way Bank, a "pocket" bank of the holding company SW Holding, owned by numerous services of the state airline AZAL during privatization. She works for the Heydar Aliyev Foundation, named after her grandfather and run by her mother Mehriban Aliyeva. In November 2021, Arzu Aliyeva was awarded the prize for "Contribution to the Culture of the Turkic World" at the Korkut Ata Film Festival in Istanbul.

== Personal life ==
She has been married to Samed Gurbanov since 3 September 2011. Samed Gurbanov (born 1988) is the only son of the Azerbaijani-Russian businessperson Aydin Kurbanov. Samed Gurbanov was born and raised in Moscow, and is currently involved in family business.

A 2012 report from the Organized Crime and Corruption Reporting Project found that she owned a house worth $1 million in the Czech luxury resort Karlovy Vary. In 2024, she was reported to own six luxury apartments in London, United Kingdom.
