= Huseyn Hasanov =

Huseyn Hasanov may refer to:

- Huseyn Hasanov (neurophysiologist) (1932–1995), Soviet-Azerbaijani neurophysiologist and doctor of biological sciences
- Huseyn Hasanov (athlete) (born 1986), Azerbaijani Paralympic athlete

== See also ==
- Hasan Hasanov (born 1940), Azerbaijani politician and diplomat
