= Nasir Imanguliyev =

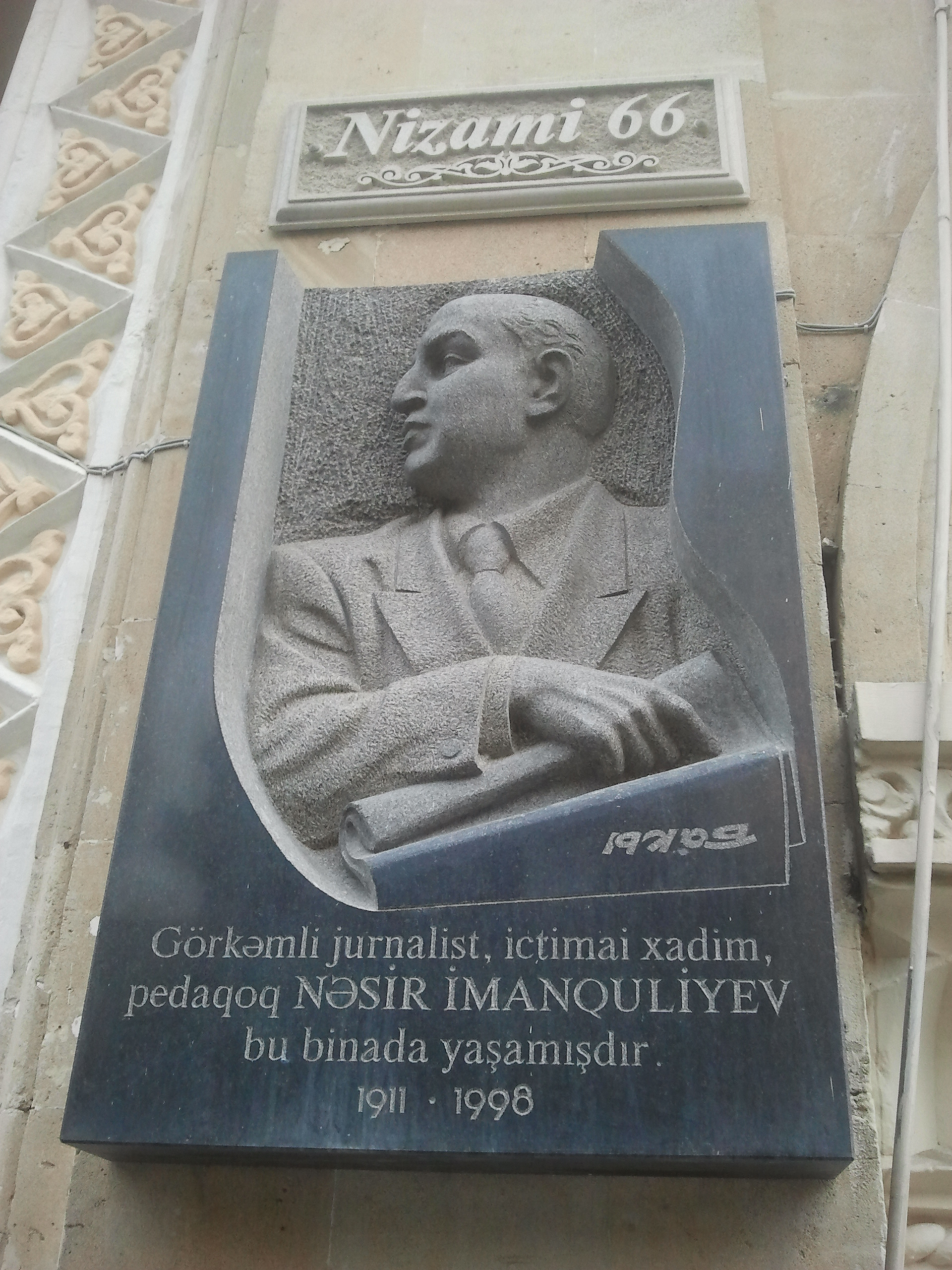
- Plaque on building where Azerbaijani journalist, public figure and pedagogue Nasir Imanguliyev lived in Baku
- Born: December 22, 1911; Baku, Azerbaijan
- Died: 1998; Baku, Azerbaijan
- Known for: Editor-in-chief of "Bakı" and "Baku" newspapers
- Scientific career
- Fields: Journalist, scientist and public figure
- Workplaces: Baku State University

Nasir Imanguliyev (Azerbaijani: Nəsir İmanquliyev) was an eminent journalist, a scientist and public figure of Azerbaijan.

== Biography ==
Nasir Imanguliyev was born on December 22, 1911, in Baku. His first works were published when he was a student. Beginning from student years he worked at “Communist”, “Yeni yol” (New way) and “Gənc işçi” (Young worker) newspapers. In 1942, during the World War II, Nasir Imanguliyev was sent to the Crimean Front as a young worker and worked as an executive secretary of “Vuruşan Krım” (Fighting Crimea) newspaper and as a translator in a military unit.

A year later, Nasir Imanguliyev was chosen a secretary to "Communist" newspaper and his patriotic articles were published in this newspaper. He began his pedagogic activity in 1947, at Baku State University.

In 1958, Nasir Imanguliyev founded “Bakı” newspaper and it was firstly published on 10 January. In 1963, "Baku" newspaper was begun to publish in Russian. Nasir Imanguliyev worked as editor in chief of this newspaper for many years. These newspapers had a great importance in development of Azerbaijani press in 1960-70's. Nasir Imanguliyev also worked as a teacher, an associate professor and professor at Baku State University for many years. He actively participated in preparation of young journalists for the republic and had great contributions in it.

Professor Nasir Imanguliyev died in 1998, in Baku.

Aida Imanguliyeva – great scientist of Oriental Studies, was Nasir imanguliyev's only child (Aida Imanguliyeva is mother of Mehriban Aliyeva – the First Lady of Azerbaijan).

In 2011, according to the order of Ilham Aliyev – the President of Azerbaijan, a series of anniversary events dedicated to Nasir Imanguliyev's 100th anniversary have been held.

Journalists, statesmen, politicians and also dears of Nasir Imanguliyev participated in these events.
