= Ivan Ivanovich Shirokogorov =

Azerbaijani Pathologist (1869–1946)

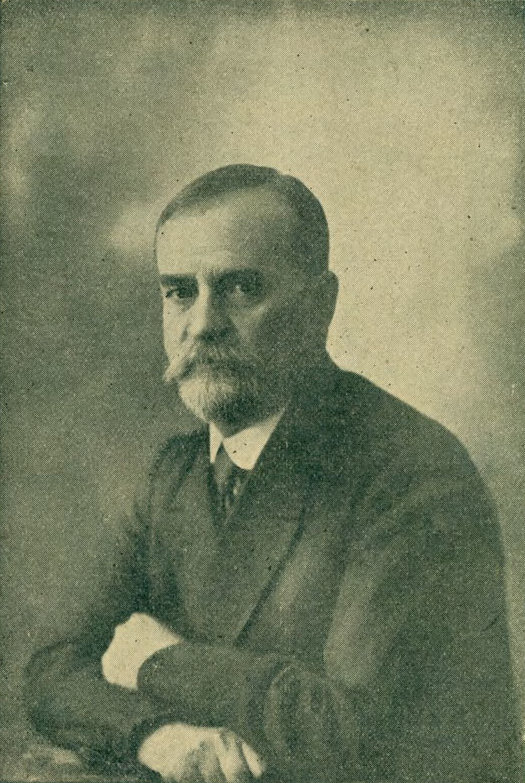
Ivan Ivanovich Shirokogorov, 1926

Ivan Ivanovich Shirokogorov (1869–1946) was an Azerbaijani pathologist.

He was a member, and one of the founders, of the Azerbaijan Academy of Sciences (1945), and a member of the USSR Academy of Medical Sciences (1944).

He was the Rector of the Azerbaijan State University (1920–1921) and the first Dean of its Medical Faculty (1919–1928). He became an Honored Scientist of Azerbaijan in 1936.
