= Halima Aliyeva =

Azerbaijani first lady (1952–2019)

- Həlimə Əliyeva

First Lady of Azerbaijan
- In role 16 June 1992 – 1 September 1993
- President: Abulfaz Elchibey
- Preceded by: Aida Bagirova
- Succeeded by: Mehriban Aliyeva

Personal details
- Born: 1952 Kələki, Azerbaijan Soviet Socialist Republic
- Died: 14 June 2019 (aged 66–67) Istanbul, Turkey
- Spouse: Abulfaz Elchibey
- Children: 2

Halima Aliyeva (Azerbaijani: Həlimə Əliyeva, 1952 – 14 June 2019) was the wife of Abulfaz Elchibey, the second president of the Republic of Azerbaijan.

== Life ==
Abulfaz Elchibey married Halima in 1979. They had one daughter and one son.

Halima Aliyeva did not appear regularly alongside Elchibey during his presidency. This was because she was taking care of their young children at the time.

Halima Aliyeva died in Turkey on 14 June 2019, at the age of 67. She was buried in the village of Kələki.

== Sources ==
- Radio Free Europe/Radio Liberty – Azerbaijan's first ladies
