= Arif Salimov =

Soviet-Azerbaijani mathematician

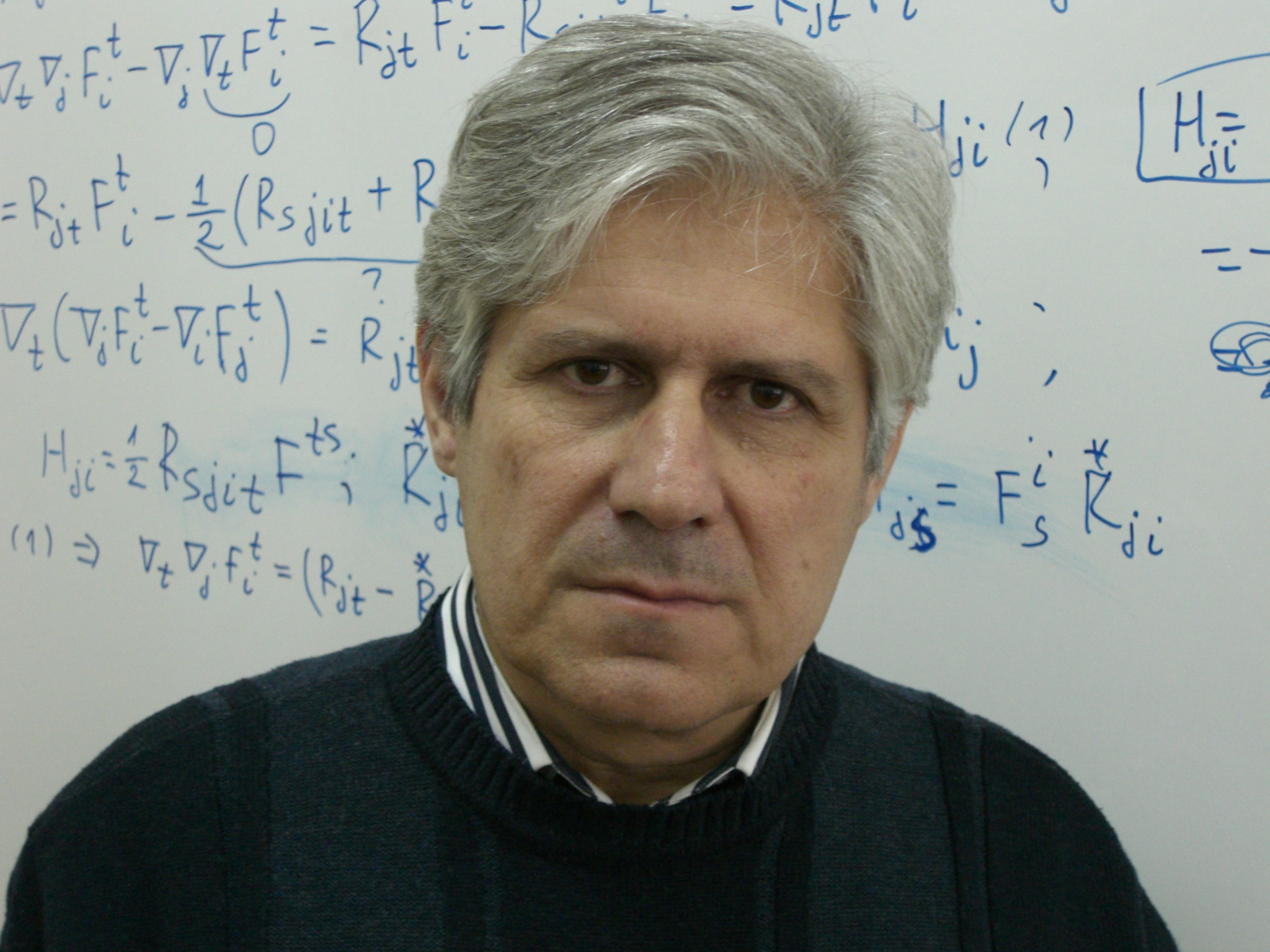
Salimov in 2011

Arif Salimov (A.A. Salimov, born 1956, Azerbaijani: Arif Səlimov) is an Azerbaijani/Soviet mathematician, Honored Scientist of Azerbaijan, known for his research in differential geometry. He earned his B.Sc. degree from Baku State University, Azerbaijan, in 1978, a PhD and Doctor of Sciences (Habilitation) degrees in geometry from Kazan State University, Russia, in 1984 and 1998, respectively. His advisor was Vladimir Vishnevskii. Salimov is Full Professor and Head of the Department Algebra and Geometry, Faculty of Mechanics and Mathematics, Baku State University. He is an author and co-author of more than 100 articles. He is also an author of 2 monographs. His primary areas of research are theory of lifts in tensor bundles, geometrical applications of tensor operators, special Riemannian manifolds, indefinite metrics, and general geometric structures on manifolds (almost complex, almost product, hypercomplex, Norden structures etc.)
