= Arif Pashayev =

Azerbaijani scientist

Arif Pashayev Arif Paşayev
- Born: February 15, 1934 (age 92); Baku, Azerbaijan SSR, Transcaucasian SFSR, Soviet Union
- Citizenship: Azerbaijan
- Children: Mehriban Aliyeva; Nargiz Pashayeva
- Scientific career
- Fields: Radiophysics

Arif Mirjalal oghlu Pashayev (Azerbaijani: Arif Mircəlal oğlu Paşayev; born February 15, 1934) is an Azerbaijani businessperson who is the father of Mehriban Aliyeva, the vice president of Azerbaijan and President Ilham Aliyev’s wife.

He owns a number of businesses. He is also rector of Azerbaijan’s National Aviation Academy. He owns two properties in the Palm Jumeirah in Dubai.

== Biography ==
Arif Pashayev was born on February 15, 1934, in Baku. He graduated from the faculty of radiophysics of Odessa National Academy of Telecommunications. In 1959 he began working at the Institute of Physics of the Academy of Sciences of the Azerbaijan SSR. From 1960 to 1964 he studied at Giredmet Institute in Moscow. In 1966 he defended his thesis on the topic "Development of methods and devices for contactless measurement of semiconductor materials parameters at high and extreme high frequencies". In 1978 he defended his thesis on the topic of “Physical basis, development principles and prospects of non-destructive methods in the research of semi-conductors” and became a doctor of physical and mathematical sciences. From 1971-1996, he headed the laboratory "Measurement accuracy without errors and physical methods of control" of the Institute of Physics of the National Academy of Sciences of Azerbaijan. In 1989 he was elected a correspondent member, and in 2001 a full member of the National Academy of Sciences of Azerbaijan.

He is a professor at the Azerbaijan Technical University, chief researcher at the Institute of Physics of the National Academy of Sciences of Azerbaijan. He is rector of the National Aviation Academy of Azerbaijan since 1996, president of the Azerbaijan Engineering Academy, Chairman of the Council on Cosmic Affairs of Azerbaijan. He is also vice president of International Academy of Engineering.

== Awards and prizes ==
State prizes

- State Prize of Azerbaijan SSR – 1991
- Shohrat Order – February 14, 2004
- Honorary title of Honored Scientist of Azerbaijan – December 14, 2005
- Sharaf Order – February 12, 2009
- Istiglal Order – February 14, 2014
