= Yagub Mahmudov =

Azerbaijani historian (born 1939)

- Azerbaijani: Yaqub Mahmudov
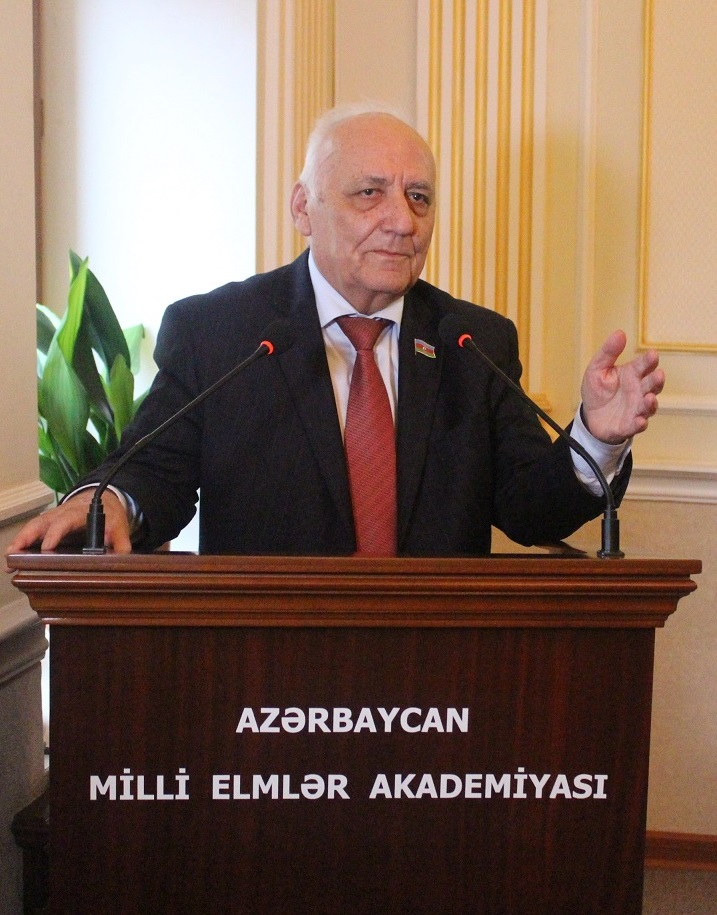
- Born: February 10, 1939 (age 87); Bash Goynuk, Shaki District, Azerbaijan SSR, Soviet Union
- Citizenship: Azerbaijan
- Education: Baku State University
- Awards: Full list
- Scientific career
- Fields: History
- Workplaces: Azerbaijan National Academy of Sciences

Yagub Mikayil oghlu Mahmudov (Azerbaijani: Yaqub Mikayıl oğlu Mahmudov; born February 10, 1939), also known as Yagub Mahmudlu, is an Azerbaijani historian, professor, full member (academician) and advisor of the Azerbaijan National Academy of Sciences, honored scientist of Azerbaijan and Dagestan, Laureate of State Prize of the Republic of Azerbaijan, and head of the Department of History of the Ancient World and Middle Ages at the Faculty of History of the Baku State University.

== Biography ==
Yagub Mahmudov was born in 1939 in the village of Bash Goynuk, Shaki district. He graduated with distinction from the Faculty of History of the Azerbaijan State University (now Baku State University) in 1962.

He defended his thesis for a candidate's degree entitled "Mutual relations between the Aghgoyunlu state and the Republic of Venice (60-70s of the 15th century)" in 1966 and his doctoral thesis on "Mutual relations of Aghgoyunlu and Safavid states with the Western European countries (2nd half of 15th – early 17th centuries)" at the Scientific Council of the M.V. Lomonosov Moscow State University in 1989.

In 1966-1975, Yagub Mahmudov took office as scientific editor, senior scientific editor, head of editorial, and deputy editor-in-chief for scientific affairs at the Azerbaijani Soviet Encyclopedia. From 1968 to 1981, he worked as a senior teacher and then as an associate professor at Azerbaijan State Pedagogical University. In 1992-1993, Mahmudov was vice chairman of the Supreme Attestation Commission under the Cabinet of Ministers of the Republic of Azerbaijan and general director of "The Encyclopedia of Azerbaijan" Publishing-Polygraphy Union. In 1981-2004, he became an associate professor, head of department, deputy dean, and dean at the Faculty of History of Baku State University.

From September 13, 2004, to January 22, 2021, Director of the Institute of History of the Azerbaijan National Academy of Sciences.

== Scientific activity ==
He is an author of more than 1000 monographs, books, textbooks, scientific scientific-publicistic articles, and other publications, on the history of diplomacy of Azerbaijan different periods of Azerbaijani and world history.

Besides the Academy of Sciences of Azerbaijan, he is also a full member of the International Academy of Sciences of the Turkic World Studies, the International Aytmatov Academy, the International Academy of Modern Sciences named after Lutfi Zadeh, the International Academy of Economic and Social Sciences of Italy, the European Academy of Natural Sciences, the Boniface Academy of Italy, and the Israeli Independent Academy for Development of Sciences.

== Political activity ==
He was a member of the Political Council of the New Azerbaijan Party (YAP) and addressed the 1st and 3rd congresses of the YAP. In 2000, 2005, 2010, and 2015, he was elected to the Milli Majlis (Parliament) of the Republic of Azerbaijan. He was Heydar Aliyev’s and then Ilham Aliyev’s advocate in the presidential elections and accompanied them during several official state visits. He is a member of the YAP Veterans Council.

== Notable works ==
- Azərbaycanın Avropa ölkələri ilə əlaqələri. Bakı: ADU, 1986.
- Взаимоотношения государств Аккоюнлу и Сефевидов с западноевропейскими странами (II половина XV - начало XVII века). Баку: Издательство Бакинского университета, 1991.
- Azerbaijan and Europe. London-New York: Xlibris, 2010. (also published in Azerbaijani, Turkish, Russian, and Italian)
- Azərbaycan tarixində Heydər Əliyev şəxsiyyəti. Bakı: "Təhsil", 2002.
- Azərbaycan Xalq Cümhuriyyəti Ensiklopediyası. 2 cilddə. Bakı: "Lider nəşriyyat", 2004–2005. (Editor-in-Chief)
- Azerbaijan: short history of statehood. Baku: "Tahsil", 2006. (also published in Azerbaijani, Russian, Urdu and Ukrainian languages)
- Garabagh: real history, facts, documents. Baku: "Tahsil", 2005. (also published in Azerbaijani, Turkish, Russian, Arabic, French and German—co-author)
- Nakhchivan: History and Monuments. Baku: "Tahsil", 2007. (in Azerbaijani and English—co-author)
- Azərbaycan tarixi atlası. Bakı: Bakı Kartoqrafiya Fabriki, 2007. (Editor-in-Chief)
- The Iravan Khanate: the Russian occupation and the relocation of Armenians to the lands of North Azerbaijan. Baku: "Chashioglu", 2010. (also published in Azerbaijani, Turkish, Russian, Romanian, Italian, Arabic, Spanish, and German—editor-in-chief, author of the introductory article and afterword)
- Heydər Əliyev ideyalarının zəfər yürüşü. Bakı: "Təhsil", 2011. (also published in Russian and Ukrainian languages)
- Şuşa‐Pənahabad. Bakı: "Təhsil", 2012. (project director and author of the foreword)
- Heydər Əliyev. 2 cilddə. Bakı: Turxan NPB, 2013. (project director, scientific editor, author of the introductory article and afterword)
- İlham Əliyev və Azərbaycan tarix elmi. Bakı: Turxan NPB, 2014.
- Real history and confabulation on "great Armenia". Baku: Historians of Azerbaijan Public Union, 2015. (also published in Azerbaijani, Turkish, Russian, Georgian, Arabic, Persian, German, Spanish, French and Hebrew )
- Historical inheritance rights of the people of Azerbaijan on Irevan and surrounding land shall be restored. Baku: Turkhan PPA, 2015. (in Azerbaijani, Russian, and English)
- Azərbaycan Respublikasının tarixi. 2 cilddə. Bakı: Azərbaycan Tarixçiləri İctimai Birliyi, 2016. (project director and scientific editor)
- Azərbaycan xalqına qarşı 1918‐ci il soyqırımları. Bakı: Azərbaycan Tarixçiləri İctimai Birliyi, 2016. (scientific editor and author of the foreword)
- Pseudoscience by falsificators, or "The History" by Armenian. Baku: Turkhan PPA, 2018. (also published in Azerbaijani, Russian, and Georgian languages)
- Azərbaycan tarixi xəritələrdə. Atlas. Bakı: Azərbaycan Tarixçiləri İctimai Birliyi, 2022. (scientific editor, author of the foreword, and publisher)

== Awards ==
- Honored Scientist of Azerbaijan (1992)
- Shohrat Order (1999)
- Sharaf Order (2009)
- Humay Award (2010)
- Honored Scientist of the Republic of Dagestan (2011)
- State Prize of the Republic of Azerbaijan (2012)
- "Ataman Anton Golovaty" Order (2012)
- 1st degree Labor Order (2019)
- Azerbaijan Democratic Republic 100th anniversary medal (2019)
- International Atatürk Award (2019)
- Baku State University 100th anniversary medal (2019)
- "Scientist of the Year in the Turkic World" international award for 2019 (2020)
- "Scientist of the Year in Europe" international award for 2022 (2022)
- "Man of the Year in the Turkic World" international award for 2022 (2023)
- Jubilee medal "100 years of Heydar Aliyev (1923–2023)" (2024)
