= Adila Mutallibova =

Azerbaijani physician (1938–2019)

- Adilə Mütəllibova

First Lady of Azerbaijan
- In role 30 August 1991 – 6 March 1992
- President: Ayaz Mutallibov
- Preceded by: Position established
- Succeeded by: Aziza Mammadova
- In role 14 May 1992 – 18 May 1992
- President: Ayaz Mutallibov
- Preceded by: Aziza Mammadova
- Succeeded by: Aida Bagirova

Personal details
- Born: Adila Gogiyeva Musa; 1938 Baku, Azerbaijan Soviet Socialist Republic
- Died: 5 July 2019 (aged 80–81) Baku, Azerbaijan
- Party: Social Democratic Party of Azerbaijan
- Spouse: Ayaz Mutallibov (m. 1961)
- Children: 2
- Occupation: Physician

Adila Mutallibova (Azerbaijani: Adilə Mütəllibova, 1938 – 5 July 2019) was an Azerbaijani physician and wife of former President of Azerbaijan Ayaz Mutallibov. She was the first First Lady of Azerbaijan from the country's independence in 1991 until 1992.

== Biography ==
Adila Mutallibova was born in Baku in 1938. She married Ayaz Mutallibov in 1961. The couple had two sons: Azad (1962–August 2011) and Zaur (b. 1970).

President Ayaz Mutallibov was forced to resign during the spring of 1992 as the First Nagorno-Karabakh War turned in Armenia's favor. Adila Mutallibova and her husband fled Azerbaijan and lived in exile in Moscow, Russia, from 1992 until 2011. They were allowed to return to Azerbaijan in August 2011 to attend the funeral of their son, Azad, who died from cancer. Adila and Ayaz Mutallibov permanently returned from exile in July 2012 and lived in Baku.

Mutallibova died following a long illness on 5 July 2019, at the age of 81. Her funeral was held later the same day at the Taza Pir Mosque in Baku. She was buried in Baku's Yasamal cemetery next to her son, Azad.
