= Mstislav Rostropovich Baku International Festival =

International Mstislav Rostropovich Festival (Azerbaijani: Mstislav Rostropoviç adına Beynəlxalq musiqi festivalı) – a festival organized by Mstislav Rostropovich in 2006, in Baku and dedicated to the 100th anniversary of Dmitri Shostakovich’s birthday was the basis of this festival. The festival dedicated to eminent Baku citizen Msitslav Rostropovich was held in December. Organizers of the festival were the Ministry of Culture and Tourism, the Mstislav Rostropovich Foundation and the Heydar Aliyev Foundation.
