= Yasamal cemetery =

Cemetery in Baku, Azerbaijan

- Yasamal qəbiristanlığı
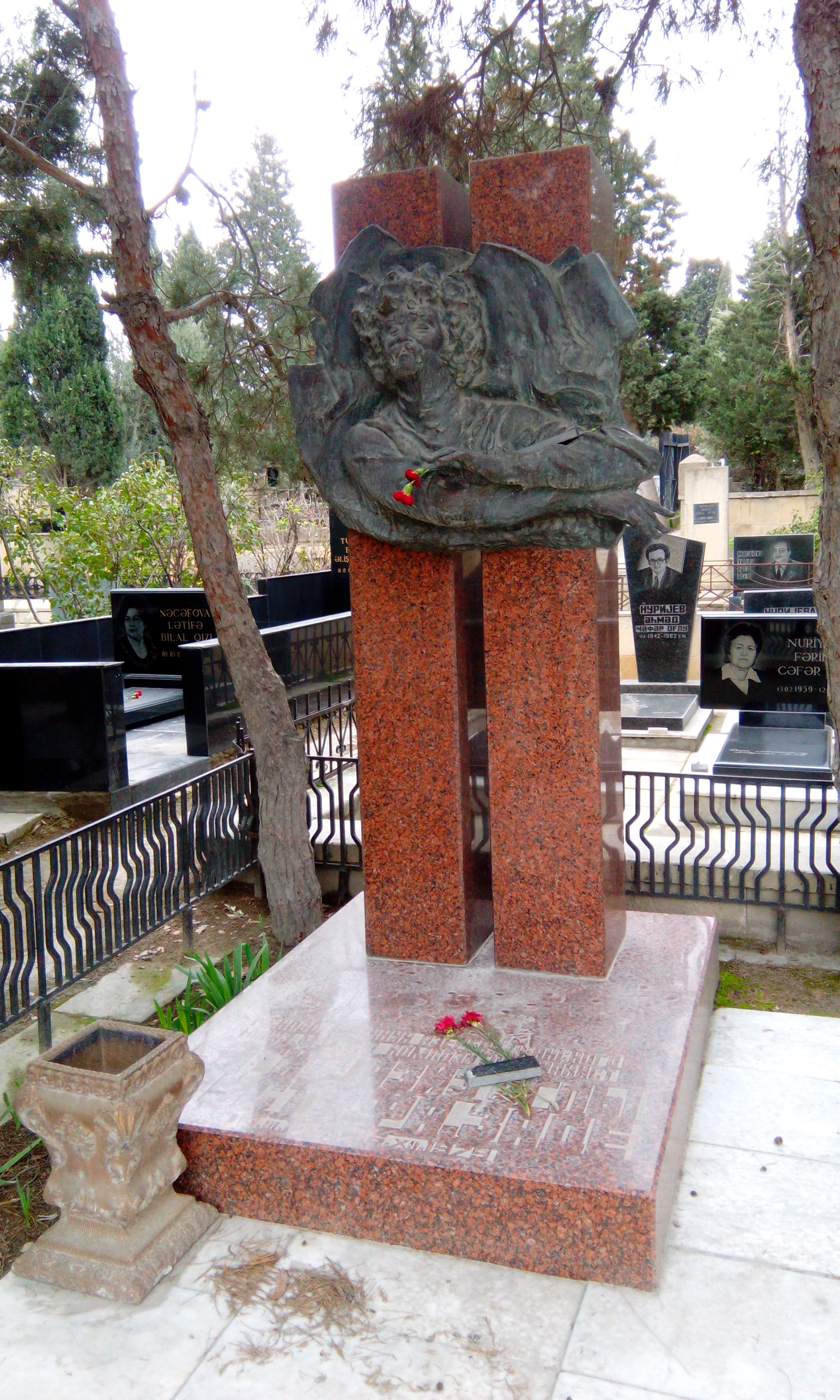
- Grave of Vagif Mustafazdeh

Details
- Established: 1940
- Location: Yasamal District, Baku
- Country: Azerbaijan
- Coordinates: 40.363936°N 49.809872°E
- Type: Minicipal
- Owned by: Baku City Executive Power
- Size: 0.55

The Yasamal cemetery (Azerbaijani: Yasamal qəbiristanlığı), also known as the Wolf's Gate cemetery (Azerbaijani: Qurd Qapısı qəbiristanlığı), is a multi-confessional citywide cemetery located in the Yasamal District of Baku, the capital of Azerbaijan.

== History ==
The cemetery is the oldest of the existing and the largest in terms of area cemetery in Baku. The Yasamal cemetery was created in 1940, and consists of three sections—Muslim, Jewish and Christian.

== Notable people buried in the cemetery ==
- Ali-Agha Shikhlinski (1863–1943), general of artillery.
- Jahangir Baghirov (1919–1943), military pilot.
- Ivan Karyagin (1894–1966), botanist, florist and biogeographer
- Vagif Mustafazadeh (1940–1979), jazz composer and pianist.
- Aliagha Aghayev (1913–1983), theater and film actor.
- Rubaba Muradova (1933–1983), opera singer.
- Samandar Rzayev (1945–1986), theater and film actor.
- Jeyhun Mirzayev (1946–1993), film actor and director.
- Ogtay Aghayev (1934–2006), pop singer.
- Gulshan Gurbanova (1950–2006), theater and film actress.
- Mir Jafar Baghirov (1895–1956), communist statesman. His remains were reburied in 2015.
- Adila Mutallibova (1938–2019), former first lady of Azerbaijan
- Ayaz Niyazi oghlu Mutallibov (1938–2022), 1st President of Azerbaijan
