= Huseyn Hasanov (neurophysiologist) =

Azerbaijani neurophysiologist (1932–1995)

Huseyn Heydar oglu Hasanov
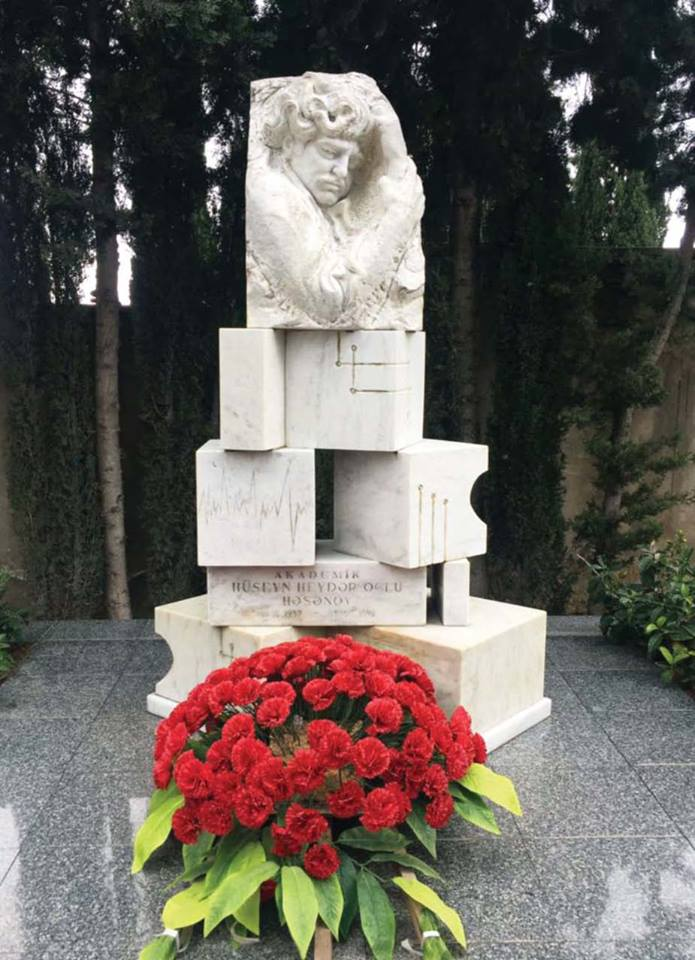
- Born: 19 October 1932; Erivan, Armenian SSR
- Died: 18 July 1995 (aged 62)
- Awards: Order of the Badge of Honour; Honored Scientist of Azerbaijan
- Scientific career
- Fields: Biology; Neurophysiology
- Institutions: Azerbaijan National Academy of Sciences

Huseyn Heydar oglu Hasanov (Azerbaijani: Hüseyn Heydər oğlu Həsənov; b. October 19, 1932, Erivan - July 18, 1995, Baku, Azerbaijan) - Azerbaijani Soviet neurophysiologist, doctor of biological sciences (1967), professor (1970), corresponding (1972) and full member (1976) of the Academy of Sciences of the Azerbaijan SSR, laureate of the State Prize of the Azerbaijan SSR (1974).

== Life ==
Huseyn Hasanaov was born on October 19, 1932, in Erivan. He entered Baku State University in 1949 and graduated in 1954. He started working at the Institute of Physiology of ANAS in 1957 and became the director of this institute in 1969. Since 1976, he headed the "Brain and Behavior" department of this institute. In 1958, he defended his Ph.D. in biological sciences, and in 1967, he defended his second doctor of sciences degree. In 1972, he was elected a corresponding member of the National Academy of Sciences of the Azerbaijan SSR, and in 1976, a full member. Huseyn Hasanov is the author of more than 300 scientific works, including 5 monographs and 1 textbook and 2 booklets. Under his leadership, 7 doctors of science and 42 doctors of philosophy were prepared.

The main scientific works are devoted to the study of the mechanisms of regulation of the autonomic functions of the CNS and the role of these regulatory processes in ensuring homeostasis. He also studied the role of selenium in biological processes.

Huseyn Hasanov died on July 18, 1995, in Baku. He was buried in II Alley of Honor.

== Awards ==
List:

- Azerbaijan SSR State prize for science and technology
- "For glorious work" medal
- Order of the Badge of Honour
- Order of Honorary Badge
- Honored Scientist of Azerbaijan

== Membership in societies ==
List:

- Chairman of the Azerbaijan Society of Physiologists.
- Member of the Presidium of the All-Union Society of Physiologists.
- Member of the International Organization for the Study of the Brain at UNESCO (1978-95).

== Source ==
- Əsədov, S (1995). Ermənistan Azərbaycanlılarının tarixi coğrafiyası. Baku: Gənclik.
- Hüseynov, Ə (2002). Hüseyn Heydər oğlu Həsənov // Məşhur biologiya alimləri. Baku: Maarif.
