= Aida Imanguliyeva =

Azerbaijani academic (1939–1992)

Aida Nasir gizi Imanguliyeva
- Born: October 10, 1939; Baku, Azerbaijan SSR, USSR
- Died: September 19, 1992 (aged 52); Baku, Azerbaijan
- Education: Azerbaijan State University
- Known for: The first woman-doctor of oriental studies
- Scientific career
- Fields: Oriental studies, Islamic studies
- Workplaces: Oriental Studies Institute of the Azerbaijan National Academy of Sciences

Aida Nasir gizi Imanguliyeva (Azerbaijani: Aida Nəsir qızı İmanquliyeva, 10 October 1939 – 19 September 1992) was an Azerbaijani scholar. She was born in Baku to a highly educated family. Her father, a well-known journalist, pedagogue, Honoured Worker of Science – Nasir Imanguliyev was one of the founders of Azerbaijani press, editor of "Bakı" and "Baku" newspapers for a long time. She was the mother of Azerbaijan's current First Lady and the current Vice President of Azerbaijan Mehriban Aliyeva.

== Life ==
In 1957, Imanguliyeva graduated from school #132 of Baku with a gold medal. In 1957, she enrolled in Azerbaijan State University named after S.M.Kirov. In 1962, after graduation from Arabic philology of the department of Oriental Studies of the advanced studies within the division of the Middle Eastern Literatures of the same university.

She continued her education and research at the Institute of the Peoples of Asia of the former Academy of Sciences of the USSR where in 1966 she was granted a PhD in Arabic Philology.

In 1966, after defence of dissertation, Aida Imanguliyeva began to work at the Institute of Oriental Studies of the Academy of Sciences of Azerbaijan-junior researcher (1966), senior researcher (1973), head of Arabic philology department (1976), deputy director for research works (1988). From 1991 to the end of her life, she worked as a director of the Institute of Oriental Studies, the Academy of Sciences of Azerbaijan.

In 1989, she successfully defended her second doctoral thesis in Tbilisi, Aida Imanguliyeva became the first woman-doctor of oriental studies, and soon she was given a professor's degree in this very speciality.

== Creativity ==
Aida Imanguliyeva is the author of three monographs (“Michail Nuayme and the Pen League”, M. 1975, “Gubran Khalil Gubran”, B. 1975, “Coryphaei of new Arabic literature”, B. 1991), more than 70 research papers focused on Eastern literatures. She was the member, deputy chairman and chairman of Defence Committee by the profile of “Literature of Asian and African countries” operating at the Institute of Oriental Studies of the Academy of Sciences of Azerbaijan.

Imanguliyeva presented oriental studies of Azerbaijan in the countries of the Middle East and in other foreign countries (Moscow, Kiev, Poltava, Saint Petersburg, Galle etc.).

In the sphere of scientific-organizational activities, Aida Imanguliyeva gave great consideration to training of highly specialized personnel of Arabists.

In the department of “Arabic philology”, which she headed, dozens of PhD dissertations were defended under her supervision.

Imanguliyeva was the member of the Presidium of the All-Union Society of Orientalists, the All-Union Coordination Council of Eastern Literature's research and the Union of Writers.

For many years, she was engaged in pedagogical activity, delivered lectures on Arabic Literature at ASU.

Imanguliyeva died on 19 September 1992 aged 52.

Each year one high-achieving student of the Department of oriental studies of BSU is awarded a scholarship named in honor of Aida Imanguliyeva.
