= Honored Scientist of Azerbaijan =

Azerbaijani honorary title

- Date: May 22, 1998
- Country: Azerbaijan
- Presented by: President
- Hosted by: Scholars and scientific-practitioners

“Honored Scientist” (Azerbaijani: Əməkdar elm xadimi) is the one of state honorary titles in Azerbaijan given by the Decree of the President of the Republic of Azerbaijan on approval of the Regulations on "Honorary Titles of the Republic of Azerbaijan".

== Canditions ==
The honorary title of Azerbaijan was given to scholars and scientific-practitioners who have been working in science for at least fifteen years, who are scientific degrees and professors of scientific institutions, higher educational institutions and other organizations by the President of the Republic with the submission of the National Assembly or the Cabinet of Azerbaijan.

The Honorary Title Certificate and its badge are presented in the ceremonial and public place by the President of Azerbaijan. Citizens who are awarded honorary titles of the Republic of Azerbaijan wear the badge on the left chest. This honorary title is given to citizens of Azerbaijan as well as foreigners. They have to have worked in this field at least 20 years. It is not given to a person for the second time. A person awarded the honorary title may be deprived of the honorary title in the case of:

- conviction for a serious crime;
- committing an offense that tarnished the honorary title

== List of Honored Scientists of the Republic of Azerbaijan ==
- Akif Alizadeh (1991)
- Ahliman Amiraslanov (1991)
- Yagub Mahmudov (1992)
- Vasim Mammadaliyev (1992)
- Isa Habibbayli (1999)
- Misir Mardanov (2000)
- Arif Pashayev (2005)
- Nargiz Pashayeva (2009)
- Telman Aliev (2009)
- Arif Salimov (2019)

== See also ==
- Heydar Aliyev Prize
- Heydar Aliyev Order
- Honored Cultural Worker of Azerbaijan
- National Scientist of the Philippines
- National Scientist of the Republic of Korea
