= Akif Alizadeh =

Azerbaijani geologist (born 1934)

- Akif Əlizadə
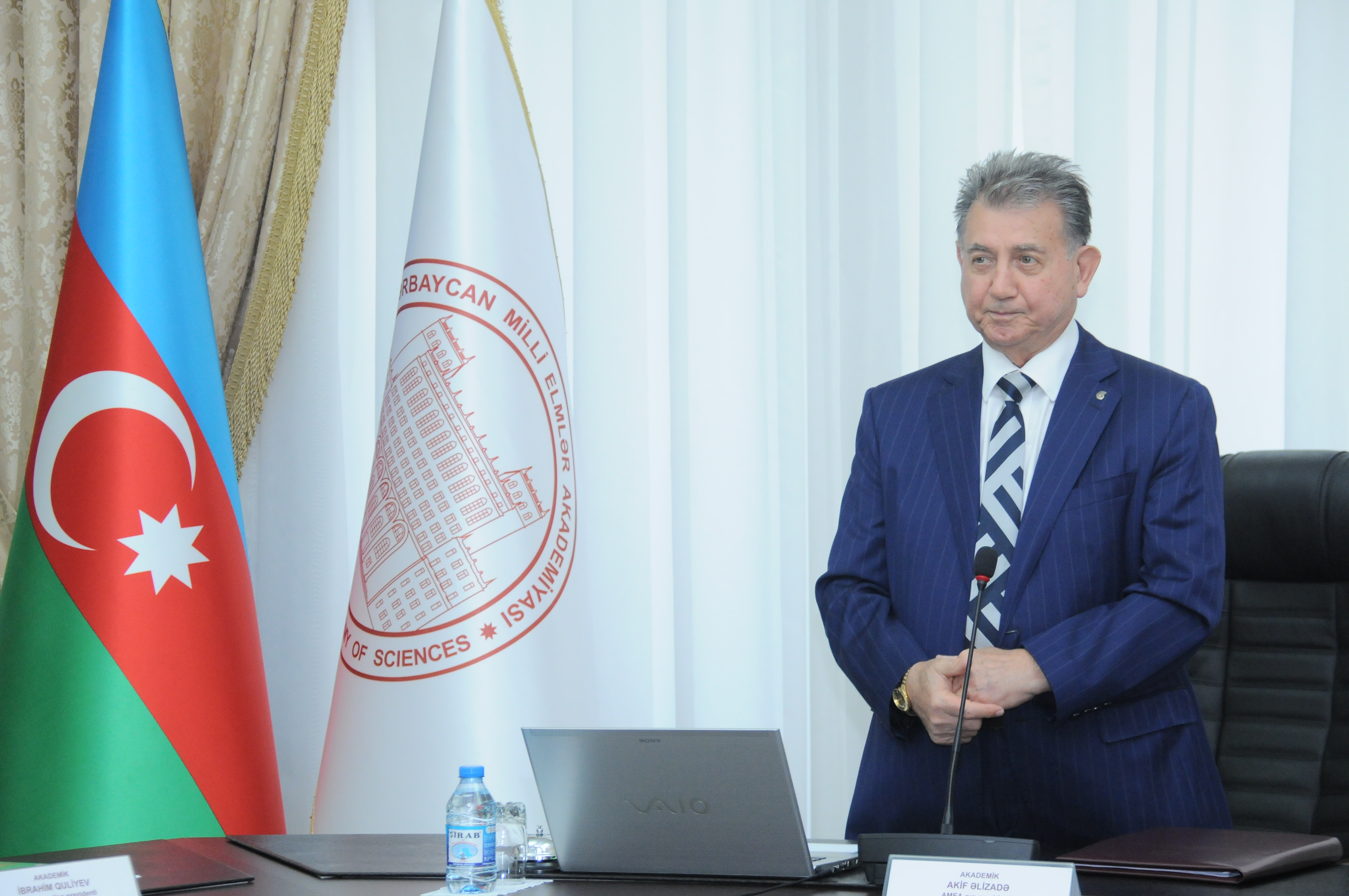
- Elizade in 2015
- Born: 25 February 1934 (age 92); Baku, Azerbaijan Soviet Socialist Republic
- Awards: Sharaf Order (2008)
- Scientific career
- Fields: Geology
- Workplaces: Azerbaijan National Academy of Sciences

Akif Alizadeh (Azerbaijani: Akif Ağamehdi oğlu Əlizadə) – is an Azerbaijani geologist, an honored scientist, state prize laureate, former president of the Azerbaijan National Academy of Sciences (2013), chairman of the board of Trustees of the Knowledge Fund under the President of the Republic of Azerbaijan, and a member of the Baku International Multiculturalism Center Board of Trustees.

== Life ==
Akif Alizadeh was born on 25 February 1934. His family is associated with a number of prominent political figures.

After graduating from secondary school, he went to study at the Azerbaijan State Oil and Industrial University. In 1957, he began working at the Institute of Geology at the Azerbaijan National Academy of Sciences (ANAS). The institute became his permanent place of activity. In 1980, he was elected a corresponding member of the Academy of Sciences of Azerbaijan SSR, and in 1989 he became a full member of the academy. He was the president of the academy from 2013 until 2019.

=== Scientific activities ===
Akif Alizadeh was a highly qualified young professional in the USSR and the youngest deputy director of the Azerbaijan National Academy of Sciences. He understood the importance of the application of traditional paleontology and stratigraphy using physical and chemical methods, and carried out his first investigation with the use of isotope geochemistry in the 1970s. His research interests cover the regional stratigraphy of the Cretaceous deposits of Azerbaijan. He has been a member of the Paleontological Society of the Soviet Union, the chairman of the Caucasus Regional Stratigraphic Commission, and a member of the Scientific Council on USSR Academy of Sciences Biosphere Problems since 1960.

The Institute of Geology became one of the leading centers within the Azerbaijan National Academy of Sciences during his leadership (as deputy director since 1970 and as director since 1976).

The Institute of Geology takes an active part in solving problems of economic development of the country as well as the fundamental aspects of the science of geology.

In recent years, Alizadeh has focused his activities on geoecology- a new scientific field which has become a priority in the activities of the Institute of Geology.

Akif Alizadeh was awarded the State Prize of the Republic of Azerbaijan for his work on the Stratigraphy of the Cretaceous Sediments in 1991.

=== Awards and titles ===
- Order of Badge of Honor (1986)
- Academician of the Azerbaijan National Academy of Sciences (1989)
- Honored Scientist of the Republic of Azerbaijan (1991)
- Order of Glory (2004)
- Sharaf Order (2008)
- Order of the Independence of the Azerbaijan Republic (2014)
