= 2016 Azerbaijani constitutional referendum =

A constitutional referendum was held in Azerbaijan on 26 September 2016. Voters were asked whether they approved of 29 constitutional amendments, with a separate vote on each one. All 29 amendments were approved by between 89% and 95% of voters. The changes created the office of the Vice President and extended the presidential term from five to seven years.

== Background ==
President Ilham Aliyev issued a decree on 18 July 2016, amending several articles of the constitution. These were reviewed by the Constitutional Court, which approved them on 25 July. On 26 July Aliyev ordered that a referendum be held, as required under articles 152 and 153 of the constitution.

== Results ==
Amendment	For		Against		Invalid/ blank	Total	Registered voters	Turnout
Amendment	Votes	%	Votes	%	Invalid/ blank	Total	Registered voters	Turnout
1	3,113,754	90.68	319,888	9.32	237,632	3,671,274	5,267,111	69.70
2	3,119,235	90.77	317,129	9.23	234,910	3,671,274	5,267,111	69.70
3	3,122,072	90.86	314,003	9.14	235,199	3,671,274	5,267,111	69.70
4	3,132,788	90.99	310,355	9.01	228,131	3,671,274	5,267,111	69.70
5	3,131,461	91.09	306,248	8.91	233,565	3,671,274	5,267,111	69.70
6	3,135,669	91.02	309,285	8.98	226,320	3,671,274	5,267,111	69.70
7	3,202,112	92.19	271,128	7.81	198,034	3,671,274	5,267,111	69.70
8	3,097,400	90.43	327,874	9.57	246,000	3,671,274	5,267,111	69.70
9	3,197,050	92.13	272,921	7.87	201,303	3,671,274	5,267,111	69.70
10	3,204,739	92.20	271,048	7.80	195,487	3,671,274	5,267,111	69.70
11	3,203,329	92.22	270,301	7.78	197,644	3,671,274	5,267,111	69.70
12	3,207,406	92.25	269,541	7.75	194,327	3,671,274	5,267,111	69.70
13	3,161,644	91.63	288,735	8.37	220,895	3,671,274	5,267,111	69.70
14	3,065,840	89.87	345,608	10.13	259,826	3,671,274	5,267,111	69.70
15	3,056,619	89.71	350,426	10.29	264,229	3,671,274	5,267,111	69.70
16	3,203,857	92.24	269,630	7.76	197,787	3,671,274	5,267,111	69.70
17	3,238,609	92.86	248,864	7.14	183,801	3,671,274	5,267,111	69.70
18	3,200,508	92.23	269,777	7.77	200,989	3,671,274	5,267,111	69.70
19	3,206,782	92.29	268,086	7.71	196,406	3,671,274	5,267,111	69.70
20	3,339,441	94.82	182,324	5.18	149,509	3,671,274	5,267,111	69.70
21	3,346,516	94.96	177,638	5.04	147,120	3,671,274	5,267,111	69.70
22	3,277,955	93.78	217,419	6.22	175,900	3,671,274	5,267,111	69.70
23	3,221,077	92.64	255,824	7.36	194,373	3,671,274	5,267,111	69.70
24	3,221,908	92.63	256,190	7.37	193,176	3,671,274	5,267,111	69.70
25	3,223,244	92.65	255,863	7.35	191,218	3,670,325	5,267,111	69.68
26	3,225,822	92.71	253,729	7.29	190,774	3,670,325	5,267,111	69.68
27	3,231,055	92.85	248,717	7.15	190,553	3,670,325	5,267,111	69.68
28	3,090,913	90.25	333,897	9.75	245,515	3,670,325	5,267,111	69.68
29	3,101,157	90.39	329,539	9.61	239,629	3,670,325	5,267,111	69.68
Source: Information Centre

== Aftermath ==
Following the referendum, President Ilham Aliyev appointed his wife Mehriban Aliyeva as Vice-President.
