= Leyla Aliyeva =

Daughter of the president of Azerbaijan, Ilham Aliyev

- Leyla Əliyeva
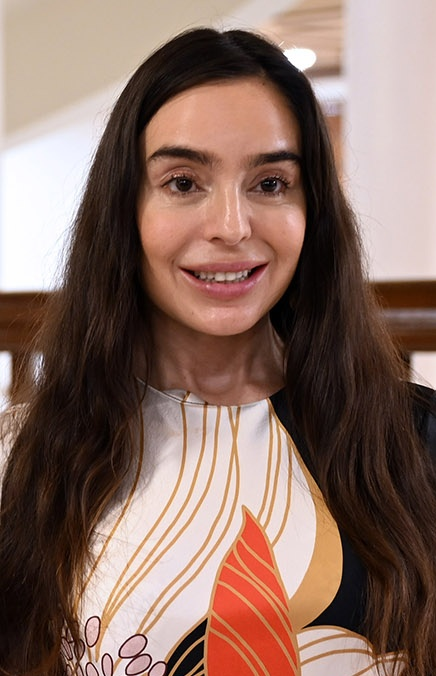
- Aliyeva in 2025

Vice President of the Heydar Aliyev Foundation
- Incumbent
- Assumed office 2011
- President: Mehriban Aliyeva
- Preceded by: Position established

Personal details
- Born: 3 July 1984 (age 42) Moscow, Russian SFSR, Soviet Union
- Spouse: Emin Agalarov (m. 2006; div. 2015)
- Children: 3
- Parent(s): Ilham Aliyev; Mehriban Aliyeva
- Relatives: Aliyev family: Heydar Aliyev (grandfather); Zarifa Aliyeva (grandmother); Arzu Aliyeva (sister); Heydar Aliyev Jr. (brother)
- Website: http://www.leyla-aliyeva.az/en/

Leyla Ilham qizi Aliyeva (Azerbaijani: Leyla İlham qızı Əliyeva, born 3 July 1984) is an Azerbaijani politician who is a member of Azerbaijan's ruling Aliyev family, as the daughter of the current president, Ilham Aliyev, and granddaughter of the former president, Heydar Aliyev.

Aliyeva and her family have substantial wealth stashed in elaborate networks of offshore companies. She and her sister Arzu Aliyeva own Azerfon, one of the largest mobile operators in Azerbaijan through three Panamanian offshore companies. Offshore companies owned by the sisters were also awarded mining rights worth billions of dollars by the Azerbaijan government. They also own PASHA Holding, a conglomerate that has been embroiled in high-level corruption.

== Early life ==
According to her personal website, Aliyeva was born in Moscow on 3 July 1985. British company records indicate she was born in July 1984. From 2006 to 2008, Aliyeva pursued a master's degree at the Moscow State Institute of International Relations (MGIMO-MSIIR; also the alma mater of her father).

== Career ==
She is a member of the ruling Aliyev family in Azerbaijan. She has been embroiled in scandals involving the family's wealth, as she and her family members has wealth stashed in elaborate networks of offshore companies. The documents showed that Leyla and her sister Arzu controlled two previously hidden British Virgin Islands-incorporated firms — Kingsview Developments Limited and Exaltation Limited. Documents have also shown her to be the owner of offshore companies LaBelleza Holdings Limited and Harvard Management Limited.

In 2005, Ilham Aliyev's regime granted license for a new mobile operator, Azerfon, to enter the Azerbaijani market. In 2011, investigative reporting revealed that Leyla Aliyeva and her sister Arzu owned 72% of the operator through three Panamanian offshore companies.

In 2006, Ilham Aliyev awarded mining rights for six gold fields worth billions of dollars to a four-company consortium owned by his daughters through offshore companies. The contract did not follow normal bidding procedures, the identity of the consortium owners was unknown, and the consortium had no history of mining. Over the course of several years, the consortium failed to make profits, as the secretive ownership structure inhibited the companies' ability to sell on the world market. The consortium unsuccessfully sought to sell itself to a private buyer. In 2016, their father Ilham Aliyev ordered the state-owned company Azergold (formed in 2015) to purchase the four-company consortium. As part of the secret deal, the daughter would receive 70% of all future mining profits while the state would just receive the remaining 30%.

Aliyeva is vice-president of the Heydar Aliyev Foundation, a charity run by the Aliyev ruling family in Azerbaijan. Leyla and her sister own a number of banks in Azerbaijan. She is editor-in-chief of the style magazine Baku, launched in 2011.

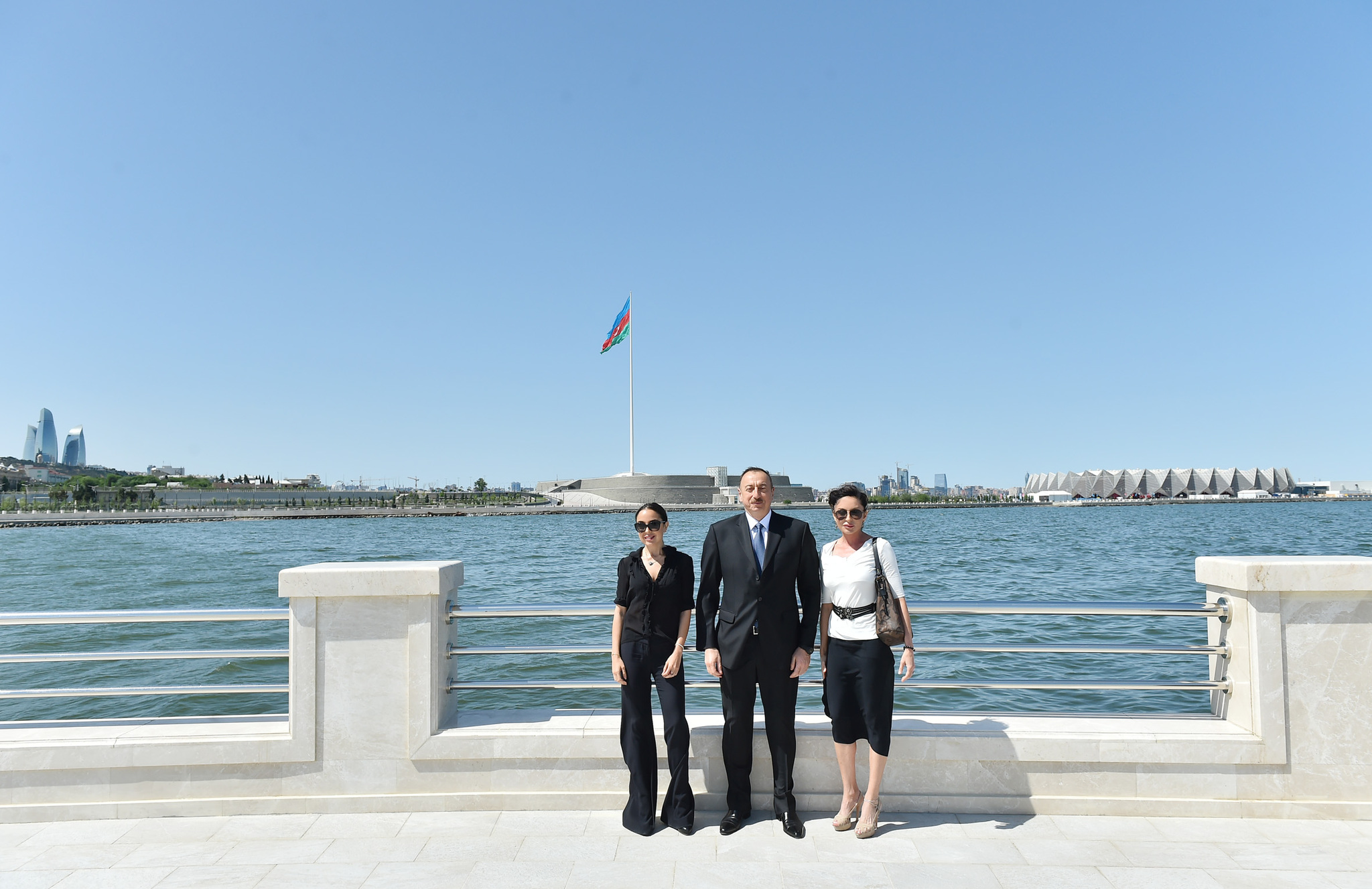
Leyla Aliyeva with her parents

Aliyeva has been involved in efforts to promote Azerbaĳan in Russia. The Azerbaijan government has given her multiple awards. She has also been given multiple awards by Russian institutions.

She was the executive producer of the 2016 film Ali and Nino, based on the novel of the same name by an Azerbaijani writer.

== Personal life ==
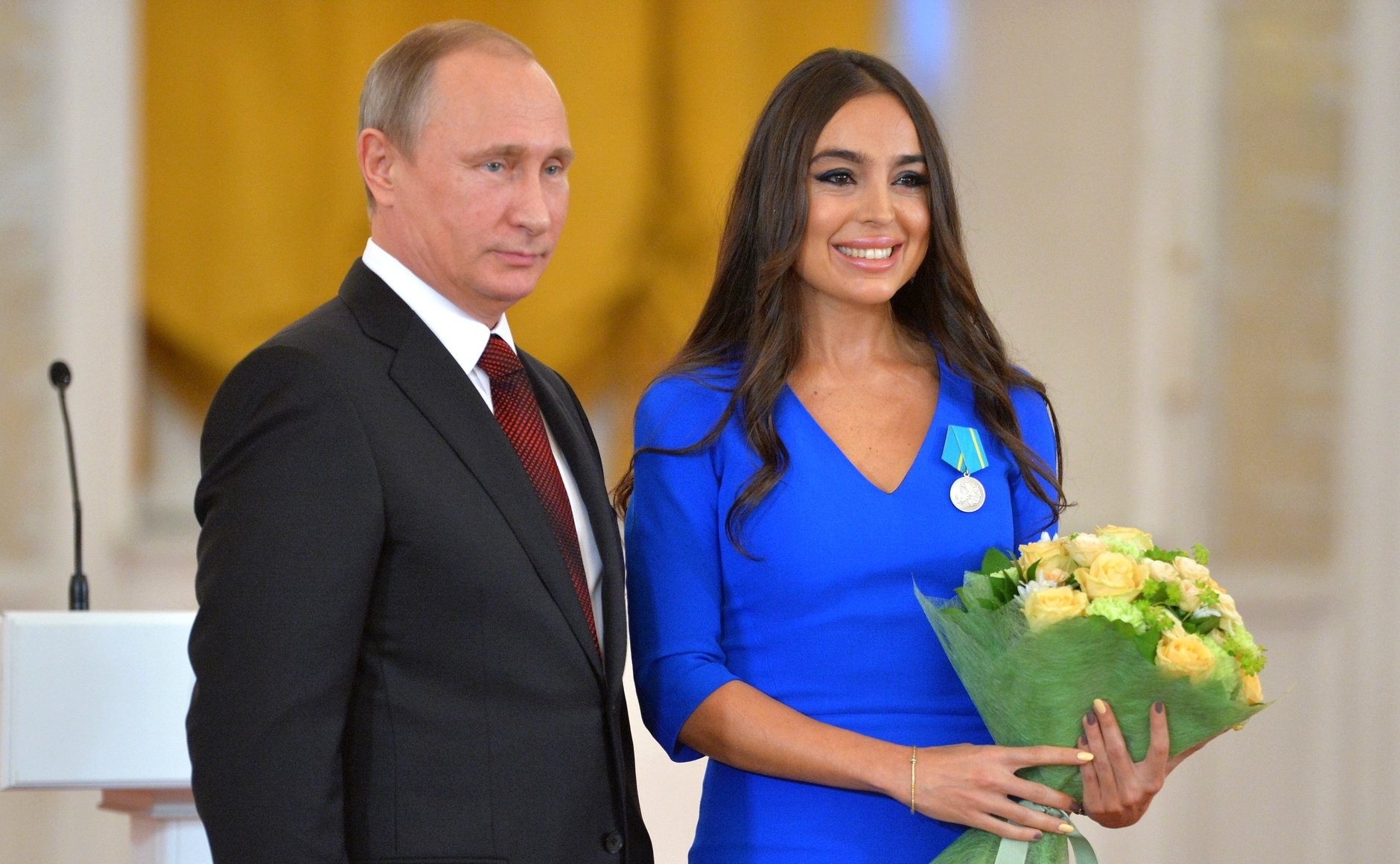
Leyla Aliyeva with Russian President Vladimir Putin in 2015

From 2006 to 2015, Aliyeva was married to Emin Agalarov, the son of Azerbaijani-Russian billionaire Aras Agalarov. Aliyeva is the mother of three children: Ali, Mikail and Amina.

In 2010, The Washington Post reported that Leyla along with her sister Arzu and brother Heydar own real estate in Dubai that is worth about $75 million. In 2006, she obtained a property in Mayendorf Gardens, a gated community in Moscow.
