= Telman Aliev =

Azerbaijani scientist (born 1935)

Telman Aliyev
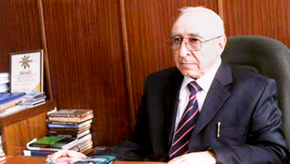
- Azerbaijani scientist
- Born: 1935 (age 90–91); Goranboy, Azerbaijan Azerbaijan
- Education: Azerbaijan Oil and Chemistry Institute
- Occupations: Academician, professor
- Writing career
- Language: Azerbaijani, Russian
- Website: www.telmanaliev.az

Telman Aliyev (Azerbaijani: Telman Əliyev) is an Azerbaijani scientist. His research focuses on noise, especially regarding technology used to control and manipulate noise.

== Experience ==
- 1958-1984, Institute of Control Systems of Azerbaijan National Academy of Sciences, technician, engineer, junior research fellow, senior research fellow, deputy director
- 1988-at present, Azerbaijan University of Architecture and Construction, the head of the chair
- 1988-2020 Institute of Control Systems, Director
- 2020-at present, Advisor of Azerbaijan National Academy of Sciences.

== Research ==
Telman Aliev developed the theory and technology of noise analysis of random signals. He also proposed algorithms and technologies for analyzing the noise as a carrier of useful information, showing the possibility of their use in control systems and also for correction of errors of traditional methods of signal analysis. Another result of his work is a technology for generating equivalent random signals, in which the estimates of the correlation, spectral and other characteristics of the useful signal and the noise coincide with the corresponding estimates of the source random signal. This opened up the possibility of significantly increasing the amount of information retrieved from noisy signals and ensuring a significant increase in the adequacy of solving many important problems.

Aliev established that at the beginning of the latent period of catastrophic accidents of technical facilities, only the estimates of the noise of the signal change, while the readings of the measuring instruments of control systems remain unchanged, and only the noise becomes the carrier of diagnostic information. As a result, intelligent systems have been developed for noise control of the beginning, dynamics of development and prediction of accidents on offshore platforms, at oil and gas production facilities at drilling rigs, at power engineering facilities, at pumping stations, in heating systems, on the rolling stock of trains, as well as on the railroad track, bridges and tunnels, etc. On the basis of networks of 10 seismic-acoustic stations for Noise monitoring in the beginning of earthquake preparation, an intelligent seismic-acoustic warning system also was created. The system alarms about the start of a change in the seismic situation, determining the zone of the focus of the expected earthquake.

== Proposed noise analysis technologies ==
Technologies proposed by Aliev included a technology for analyzing noise as a carrier of useful information, which allows determining the estimate of the cross-correlation function between the useful signal and the noise, and the noise variance, not only ensuring the adequacy of the solution, but also significantly expanding the area of practical application of these technologies. Furthermore, he proposed a technology for using smartphones and laptops for daily monitoring of the state of the heart by noise analysis of the noise of heart sounds.

== Books ==
- Noise Control of Heart by Means of a Mobile Phone (Noise контроль сердца мобильным телефоном)
- Noise Technologies for Minimization of Damage Caused by Earthquakes (Помехотехнологии минимализации ущерба от землетрясений)
- Digital Noise Monitoring of Defect Origin (Цифровой помехомониторинг зарождения дефекта)
- Robust Technology with Analysis of Interference in Signal Processing (Робастная технология с анализом помехи)
- Robust Computer Analysis (Робастный компьютерный анализ)
- Fundamentals of Experimental Analysis (Основы экспериментального анализа)
- Experimental Analysis (Экспериментальный анализ)

== Medals and rewords ==
- Keldysh medal – 1991
- Honour Medal of Azerbaijan Republic – 2004
