= Vice President of Azerbaijan =

Public office in Azerbaijan

Vice President of Republic of Azerbaijan
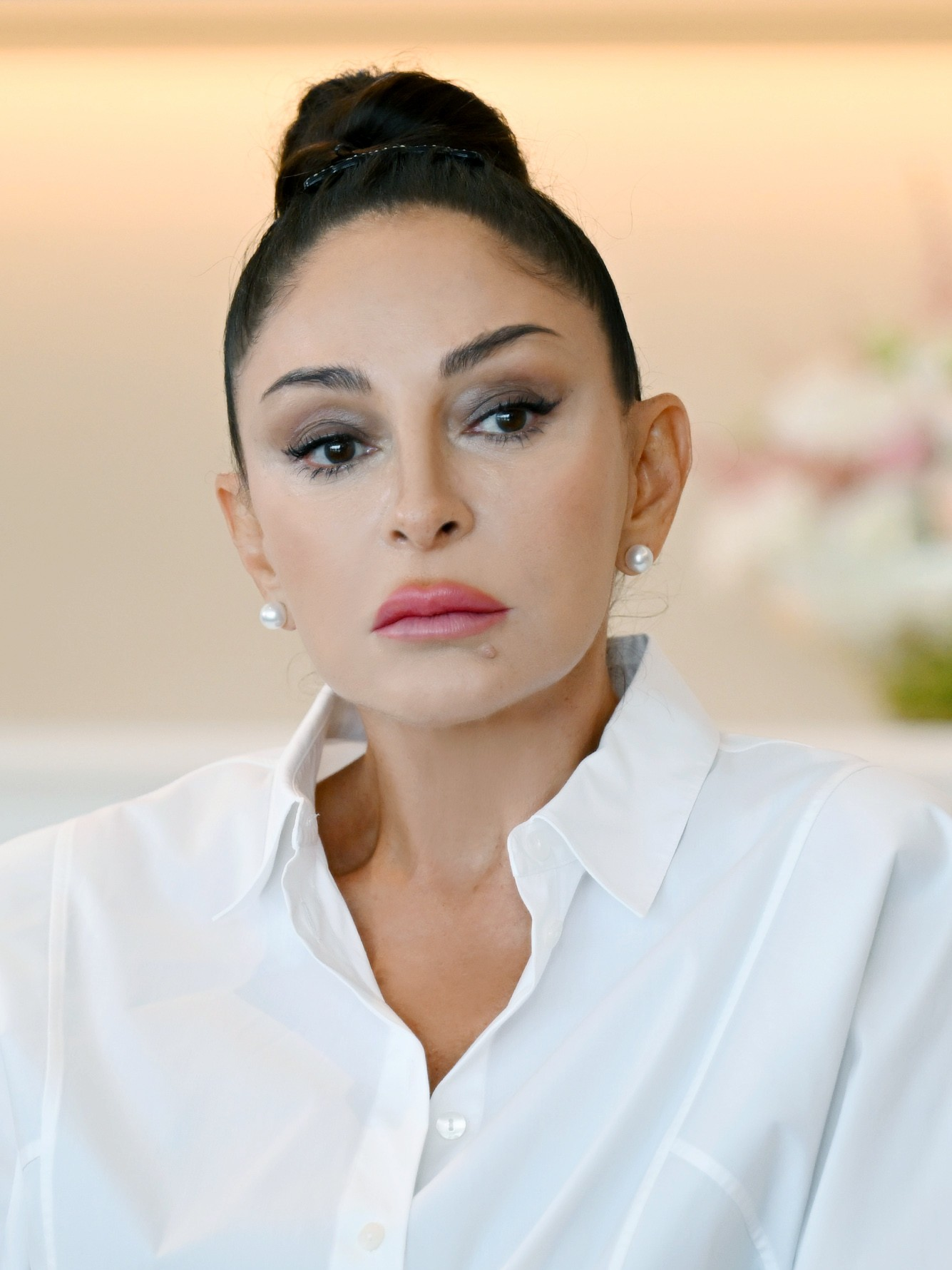
- Incumbent; First Vice President; Mehriban Aliyeva since 21 February 2017
- Style: Madam Vice President; Her Excellency
- Appointer: President
- Term length: No term limit
- Inaugural holder: First Vice President: Mehriban Aliyeva; Vice Presidents: None appointed
- Formation: 26 September 2016

The Vice President of Azerbaijan (Azerbaijani: Azərbaycan Respublikasının vitse-prezidenti) is the second-highest office in Azerbaijan established by the 2016 constitutional referendum. The first and current vice president is First Lady Mehriban Aliyeva. Ilham Aliyev, the president of Azerbaijan, created the position of vice president in 2017 and appointed his wife to the position.

The First Vice President ranks immediately after the president and is the first in the line of succession, while Vice Presidents rank below the First Vice President. As a consequence, if Aliyev were to step down, Aliyeva would become the president of Azerbaijan. Critics, many of whom have labelled Aliyev an authoritarian leader, said the creation of the position was intended to consolidate the family's dynastic rule in Azerbaijan.

== Formation and powers ==
The offices of First Vice President and Vice Presidents were established through a constitutional amendment approved by the referendum on 26 September 2016. According to Article 103¹ of the Constitution, these officials are appointed and dismissed by the president. A candidate must be a citizen of Azerbaijan with voting rights, hold a university degree and have no obligations to other states.

Vice Presidents are granted constitutional immunity during their term. They cannot be detained, prosecuted or searched except in cases where they are caught in the act, in which case the Prosecutor General must be informed immediately. Immunity can be lifted only by decision of the president on the basis of a request from the Prosecutor General. The Constitution also provides that the First Vice President and their family are supported by the state and protected by special security services.

According to the Constitution of Azerbaijan, the president has the authority to appoint a single First Vice President of Azerbaijan (Azerbaijani: Azərbaycan Respublikasının Birinci vitse-prezidenti) and one or more Vice Presidents. Since the creation of these offices in 2016, no Vice Presidents have ever been appointed. The only filled position is that of the First Vice President, currently held by Mehriban Aliyeva, who was appointed on 21 February 2017.

== First Vice President ==
The First Vice President is the highest-ranking deputy to the president and the first in the line of succession. The office was created by the 2016 constitutional amendment at the same time as the vice presidencies. On 21 February 2017, President Ilham Aliyev appointed his wife, Mehriban Aliyeva, as the inaugural and current holder of the position.

According to the Constitution, if the president resigns or is unable to perform the duties of office, extraordinary elections must be held within 60 days, and during that period the First Vice President assumes presidential powers. Should the First Vice President resign or become incapacitated, the position passes to one of the Vice Presidents in an order determined by the president. If no Vice Presidents are able to serve, authority is transferred to the Prime Minister, and then to the chair of the Milli Majlis. Critics have argued that the creation of the position was intended to consolidate the family's rule in Azerbaijan.

The First Vice President may also be authorised by the president to sign interstate or intergovernmental agreements on behalf of the country.

=== Secretariat of the First Vice President ===
The Secretariat of the First Vice President of Azerbaijan is composed of the following officials:

- Altay Hasanov – Head of the Secretariat
- Mehdi Dadashov – Deputy Head of the Secretariat
- Yusuf Mammadaliyev – Assistant to the First Vice President
- Gunduz Karimov – Assistant to the First Vice President
- Emin Huseynov – Assistant to the First Vice President

== List of vice presidents ==
No.	Portrait	Name (Birth/Death)	Position	Start term	End term	Took office	Election	Cabinet	Party
1		Mehriban Aliyeva; Mehriban Əliyeva (born 1964)	First Vice President	21 February 2017	Incumbent no term limit	9 years, 256 days	–	Aliyev	New Azerbaijan Party
No vice presidents have been appointed since the office was created in 2016

== See also ==
- President of Azerbaijan
- First Vice President of Azerbaijan
- Presidential Administration of Azerbaijan
