= Heydar Aliyev Foundation =

Private foundation in Azerbaijan

Heydər Əliyev Fondu
- Founded: 2004
- Founder: Ilham Aliyev; Mehriban Aliyeva
- Type: Private foundation
- Purpose: Arts, charity, education, and science
- Location: Baku, Azerbaijan
- Region served: Global
- Key people: Mehriban Aliyeva (President); Leyla Aliyeva (Vice-President)
- Website: www.heydar-aliyev-foundation.org

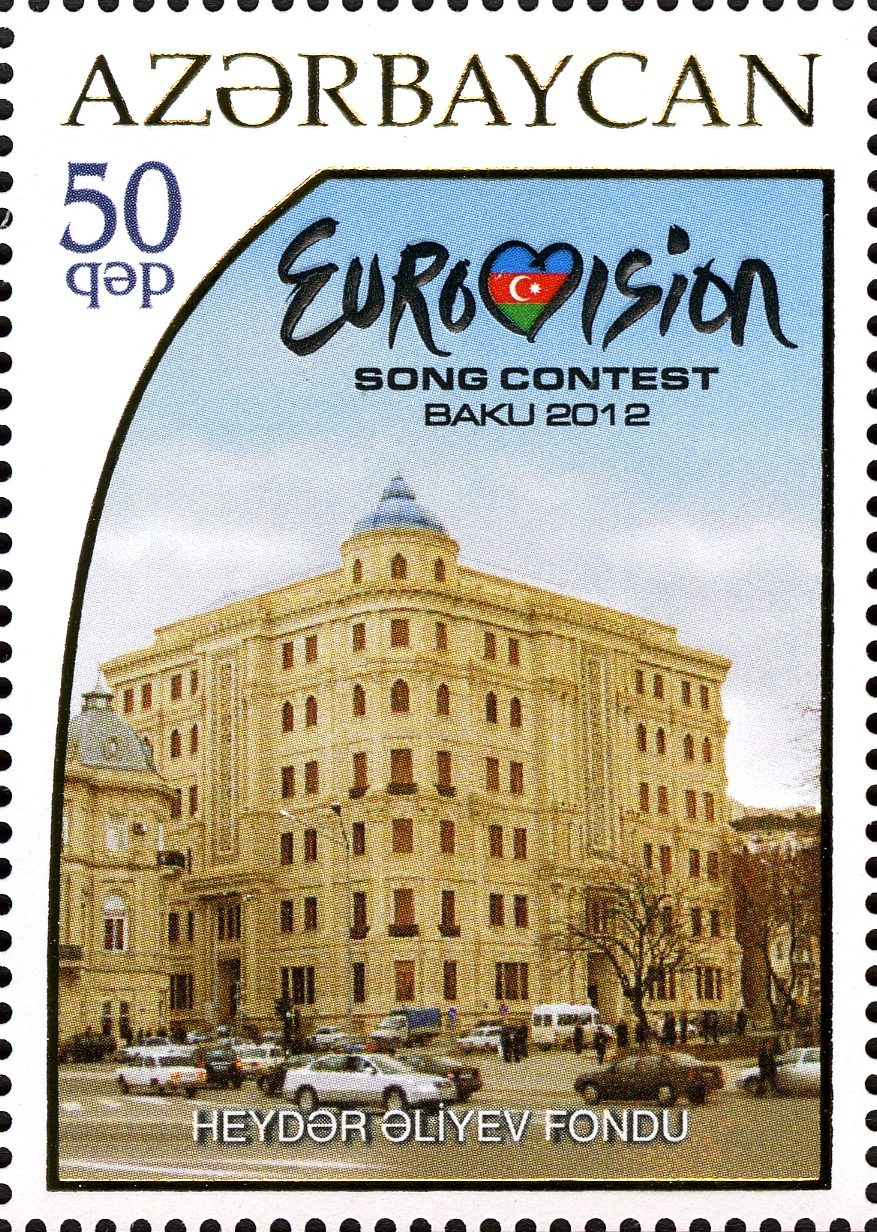
The headquarters of the foundation shown on an Azerbaijani postage stamp, 2012.

The Heydar Aliyev Foundation (Azerbaijani: Heydər Əliyev Fondu) is a private foundation headed by Azerbaijan's First Lady Mehriban Aliyeva. The foundation is named after Azerbaijan's former president, Heydar Aliyev – the father of the incumbent president Ilham Aliyev. The foundation has been criticized for not being transparent about its finances, and for being a vehicle of corruption.

== History ==
Heydar Aliyev died in 2003, and the foundation was created in 2004 by Ilham Aliyev.

== Structure of the foundation ==
The Heydar Aliyev Foundation is a non-governmental and non-commercial organization.

Representative office cooperates with different countries in an international scale. Foundation's offices are operated abroad such as, United States, Russia, Romania and Turkey.

=== Activities ===
According to a 2009 EurasiaNet article, "The HAF builds more schools than Azerbaijan's Ministry of Education, more hospitals than the Ministry of Health, and conducts more cultural events than the Ministry of Culture." It funded the Baku Museum of Modern Art, intended as a focus for an "eco-cultural zone" that will also include a white-sand beach, a Frank Gehry skyscraper, and a walkway that projects out over the Caspian Sea. The foundation has sponsored several projects in France, helping to finance renovations at the Louvre Museum and the Palace of Versailles. The foundation gave €40,000 to help renovate stained-glass windows in France's Strasbourg Cathedral. In 2011, the foundation donated €50,000 for the reconstruction of the Berlin City Palace.

Other international projects have included rebuilding a school in Pakistan that had been destroyed by an earthquake and organizing events in 2011 in Moscow and St. Petersburg to showcase Azerbaijani art and music.

The foundation takes part in the organization and holding of musical festivals like the "Gabala International Music Festival", the "World of Mugham Festival", the "Uzeyir Hajibeyov International Music Festival", and the "Mstislav Rostropovich Baku International Festival". In May 2021, the foundation brought back the "Kharibulbul International Folklore Festival" in Shusha, 30 years since it last took place (1991). The festival continued to be celebrated in 2022.

The foundation funded the restoration of the catacombs in the Vatican based on the agreement signed on June 22, 2012, by the president of the foundation, Mehriban Aliyeva, and the minister of culture of the Vatican, Cardinal Gianfranco Ravazi.

Between 2004 and 2014, the foundation published numerous booklets and books talking about Azerbaijan's history, culture, art, cuisine and nature.
