= Mehriban Aliyeva =

First Vice President of Azerbaijan since 2017

- Mehriban Əliyeva
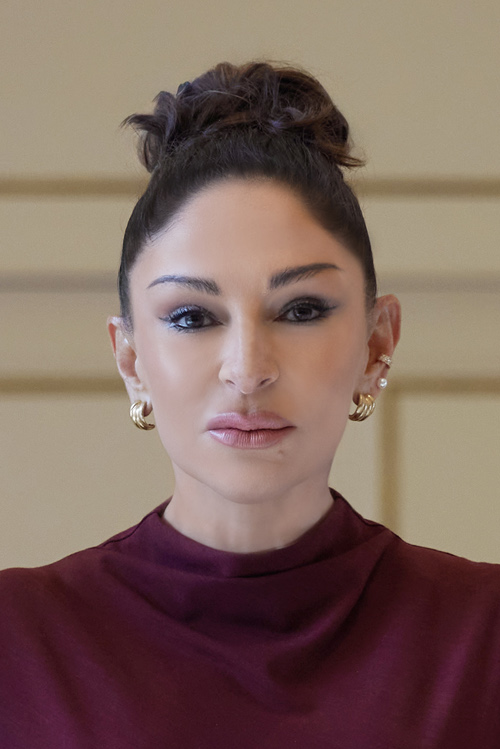
- Aliyeva in 2025

First Vice President of Azerbaijan
- Incumbent
- Assumed office 21 February 2017
- President: Ilham Aliyev
- Preceded by: Office established

First Lady of Azerbaijan
- Current
- Assumed role 31 October 2003
- President: Ilham Aliyev
- Preceded by: Halima Aliyeva

First Deputy Leader of the New Azerbaijan Party
- Incumbent
- Assumed office 7 June 2013 (Note: Deputy Leader until 5 March 2021; First Deputy Leader since then.)
- Leader: Ilham Aliyev
- Preceded by: Office established

President of the Heydar Aliyev Foundation
- Incumbent
- Assumed office 10 May 2004
- Vice President: Leyla Aliyeva
- Preceded by: Office established

Member of the National Assembly
- In office 2 December 2005 – 6 March 2017
- Constituency: Azizbeyov 2nd №14 (2005-2010); Khazar №14 (2010-2017)

Personal details
- Born: Mehriban Arif qızı Paşayeva; 26 August 1964 (age 62) Baku, Azerbaijan SSR, Soviet Union
- Party: New Azerbaijan Party
- Spouse: Ilham Aliyev (m. 1983)
- Children: Leyla; Arzu; Heydar
- Relatives: Aliyev family
- Education: Azerbaijan Medical University
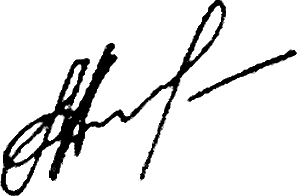
- Signature
- Website: mehriban-aliyeva.az/en

Mehriban Arif gizi Aliyeva (Note: Azerbaijani: Mehriban Arif qızı Əliyeva Paşayeva, IPA: [mehɾiˈbɑn ɑˈɾif ɡɯˈzɯ æˈlijevɑ pɑˈʃɑjevɑ]) (née Pashayeva; born 26 August 1964) is an Azerbaijani politician and former physician who is the First Vice President and First Lady of Azerbaijan.

She is married to Ilham Aliyev, the president of Azerbaijan. Aliyev created the position of First Vice President in 2017 and appointed his wife to the position.

== Early life and family ==
Mehriban Pashayeva was born in Baku, and is from a family described in leaked US Embassy cables as "the single most powerful family in Azerbaijan." Her grandfather was the writer Mir Jalal Pashayev, an Iranian Azerbaijani born in Iran. Her uncle Hafiz Pashayev was Azerbaijan's first Ambassador to the United States. Her father, Arif Pashayev, is Rector of the National Aviation Academy in Baku, and her mother, Aida Imanguliyeva (1939–1992) was a philologist and Arabist, daughter of the journalist and pedagogue Nasir Imanguliyev.

== Education and early career ==
Aliyeva finished secondary school number 23 in 1982. She entered the Preventive-Treatment Faculty of the Azerbaijan Medical University, in which she excelled, and later continued her studies at the Sechenov Moscow Medical Academy, from which she graduated in 1988. From 1988–92, Mehriban Aliyeva worked at the State Research Institute of Eye Diseases of the Russian Academy of Medical Sciences in Moscow, which was led by Dr. Mikhail Krasnov. Aliyeva got her PhD after defending a thesis on "Euthanasia and humanism issues in medicine" in 2005. Two articles in The Times in 2005 described her as a "qualified physician" and "former eye doctor."

== Career ==
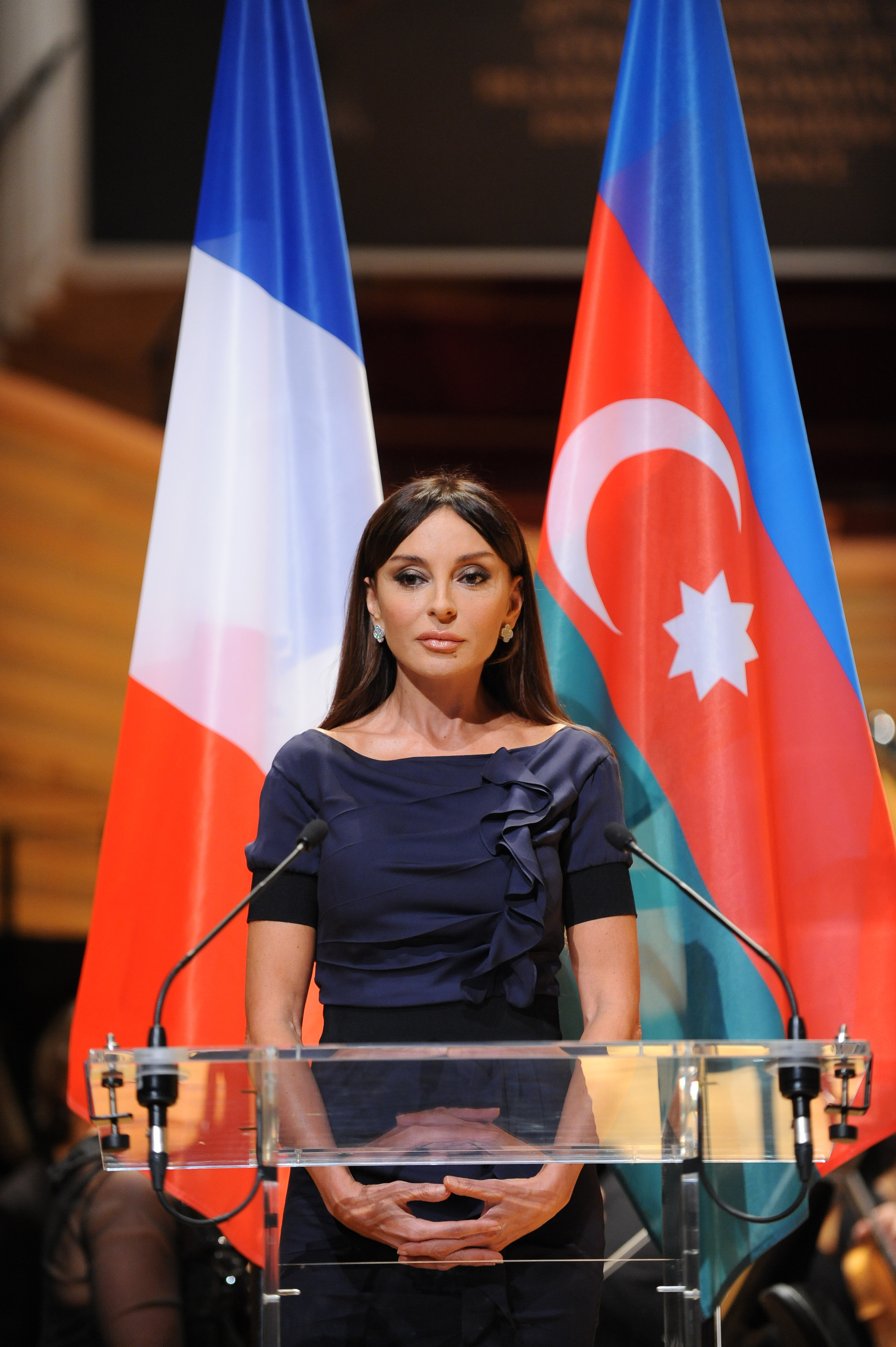
Mehriban Aliyeva during her visit to France

In 1995, she established the Azerbaijani Culture Friends Foundation. In 1996, she founded the magazine "Azerbaijan - Heritage" published in three languages (Azerbaijani, English and Russian) in order to promote Azerbaijani culture.

Leaked documents reveal that in 2003 she registered an offshore company in the British Virgin Islands, Rosamund International Ltd.

Aliyeva established on 10 May 2004 the Heydar Aliyev Foundation, which focuses on studying and holding events to promote Heydar Aliyev's political ideology. In Azerbaijan, according to a 2011 news article, "the HAF builds more schools than Azerbaijan's Ministry of Education, more hospitals than the Ministry of Health, and conducts more cultural events than the Ministry of Culture." The Heydar Aliyev Foundation also sponsors projects outside Azerbaijan, including helping to finance renovations at the Louvre Museum, Palace of Versailles, and Strasbourg Cathedral.

She is UNESCO Goodwill Ambassador, and Goodwill Ambassador of ISESCO. She was a member of the Executive Committee of the National Olympic Committee of Azerbaijan at the 4th General Assembly of the NOC on 28 December 2004.

Since 2004, she is a member of the Political Board of the New Azerbaijan Party, which her husband is the leader of. She was selected as the deputy chairperson of the Party in June 2013. She was appointed by her husband as the chairperson of the Organizing Committee for the 1st European Games in Baku.

=== Member of Parliament ===
In Azerbaijan's fraudulent 2005 parliamentary elections, she was elected to the National Assembly of Azerbaijan. Her candidacy was run by the New Azerbaijan Party from the Azizbeyov Second Constituency №14, and she was elected to the Parliament with 92.12% of the votes. She had previously broken with tradition to help campaign for her husband in 2003, when he ran for President of Azerbaijan. The Sunday Times, writing in 2005 about Aliyeva's decision to run for the Azerbaijani parliament, described her as already wielding "considerable influence," and the Heydar Aliyev Foundation as "a powerful and wealthy institution set up to safeguard the late president's legacy and support a number of educational and charitable projects." She was nominated from Khazar Constituency №14 in 2010 and 2015 parliamentary elections and gained 94.49% of the votes in 2010, 96.7% in 2015.

During her MP period, Mehriban Aliyeva appealed to Milli Majlis for the adoption of amnesty acts on 28 May – Republic Day. As a result, in 2007, 2009, 2013 and 2016, more than 30,000 prisoners were released from different sentences.

=== First Vice President ===
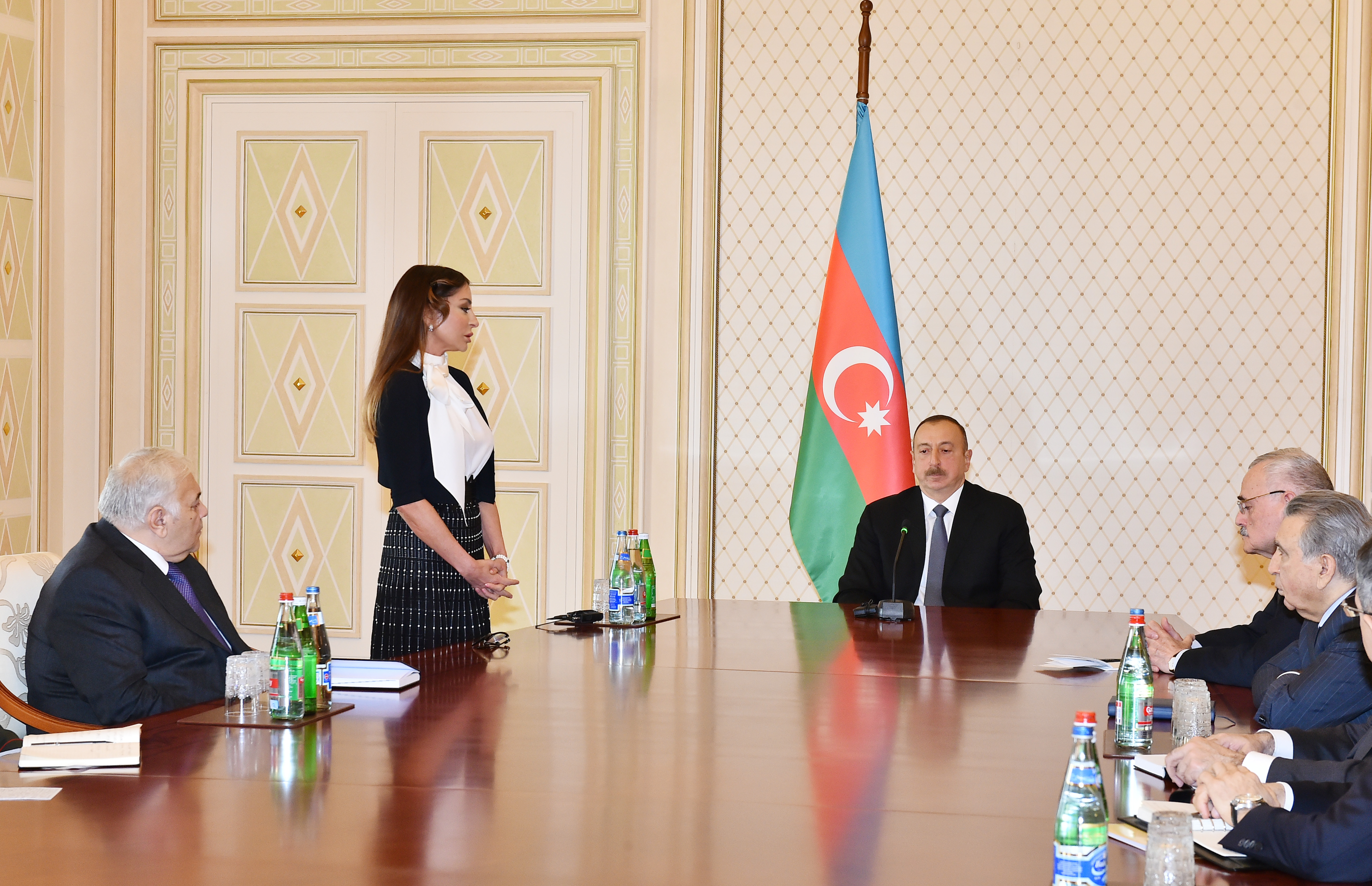
Mehriban Aliyeva during the meeting of the Azerbaijan Security Council in 2017

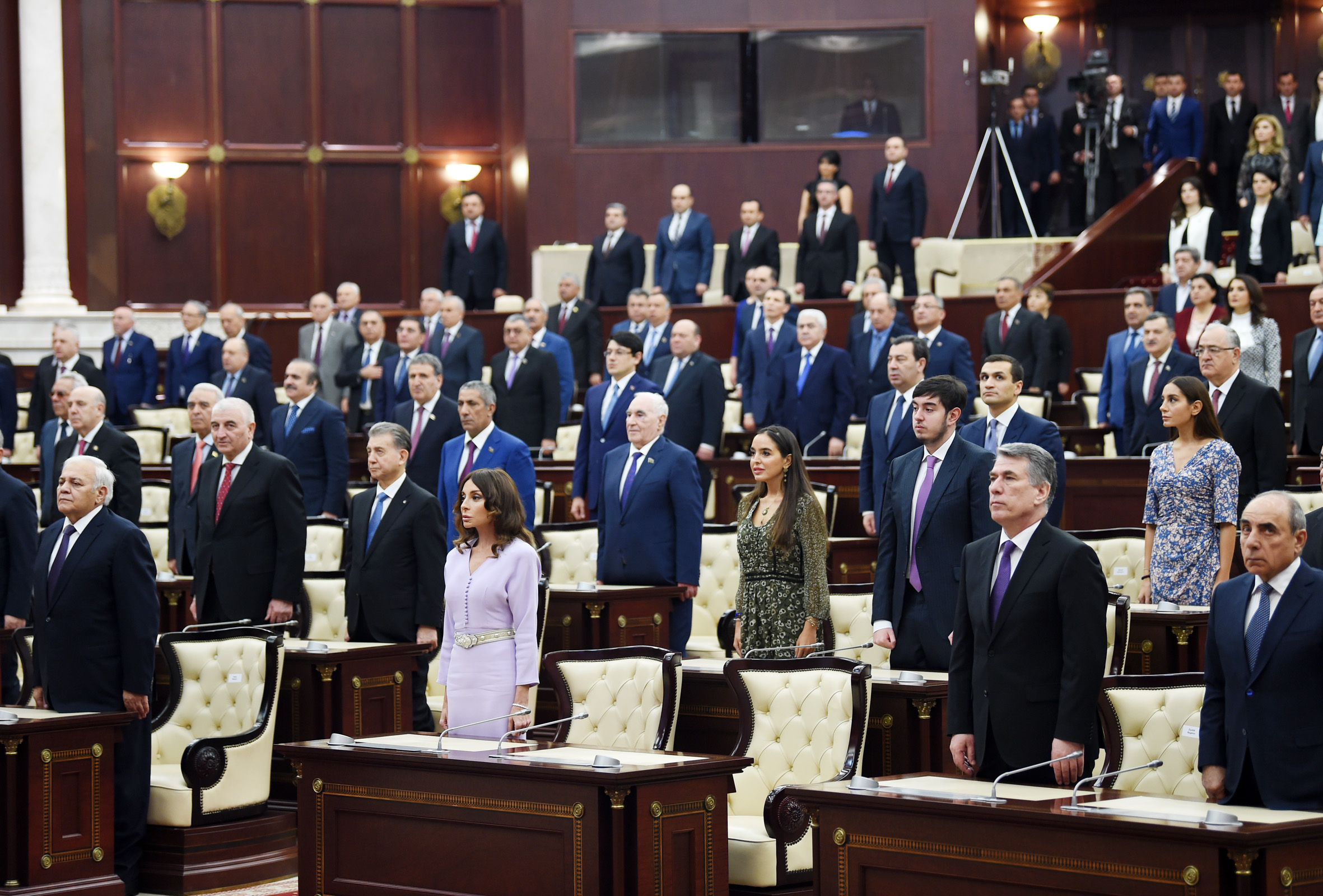
Mehriban Aliyeva in the Azerbaijani parliament during the presidential inauguration in 2018

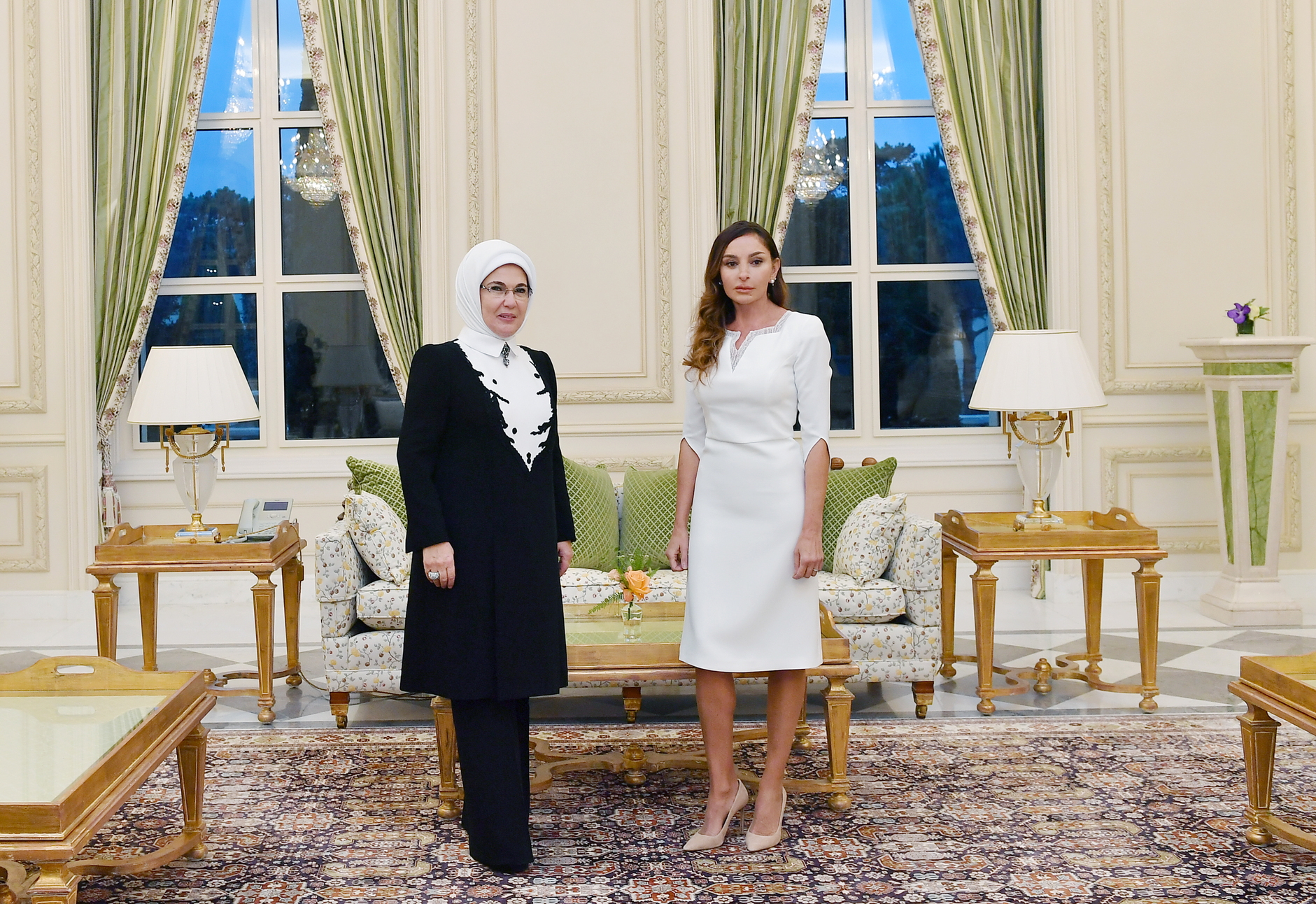
Mehriban Aliyeva meets with First Lady of Turkey Emine Erdoğan in 2020

On 21 February 2017, she was appointed First Vice President of Azerbaijan by her husband Ilham Aliyev, the president and authoritarian leader of Azerbaijan. If her husband would step down, she would become President of Azerbaijan. This was an office that was created through a constitutional referendum in 2016 which Ilham Aliyev had ordered. The referendum also lowered the age requirement for president, making it possible for Aliyev's son, Heydar Aliyev Jr., then 19 years old, to become president. Critics said these changes were intended to consolidate the family's dynastic rule.

== Criticism ==
Freedom House reports that Heydar Aliyev Foundation, headed by Aliyeva since its creation in 2014, while supporting cultural projects domestically and abroad, has been focusing on "burnishing the regime’s international image and advancing Baku’s official position on the disputed territory of Nagorno-Karabakh". It has also been criticized as a vehicle for corruption.

=== Political repression ===
Aliyeva has claimed that Azerbaijan is a land of political tolerance and denied claims of mass political imprisonment. In 2015, when asked about the plight of imprisoned journalists Khadija Ismayilova and Leyla Yunus, Mehriban did not respond. Her appointment as First Vice President coincided with the detention of more opposition party activists, which may have been an attempt to stifle any attempts to protest the move. In Azerbaijan, power is concentrated in the hands of Aliyev and his extended family, and human rights violations include torture, arbitrary arrests, as well as harassment of journalists and non-governmental organizations.

== Personal life ==
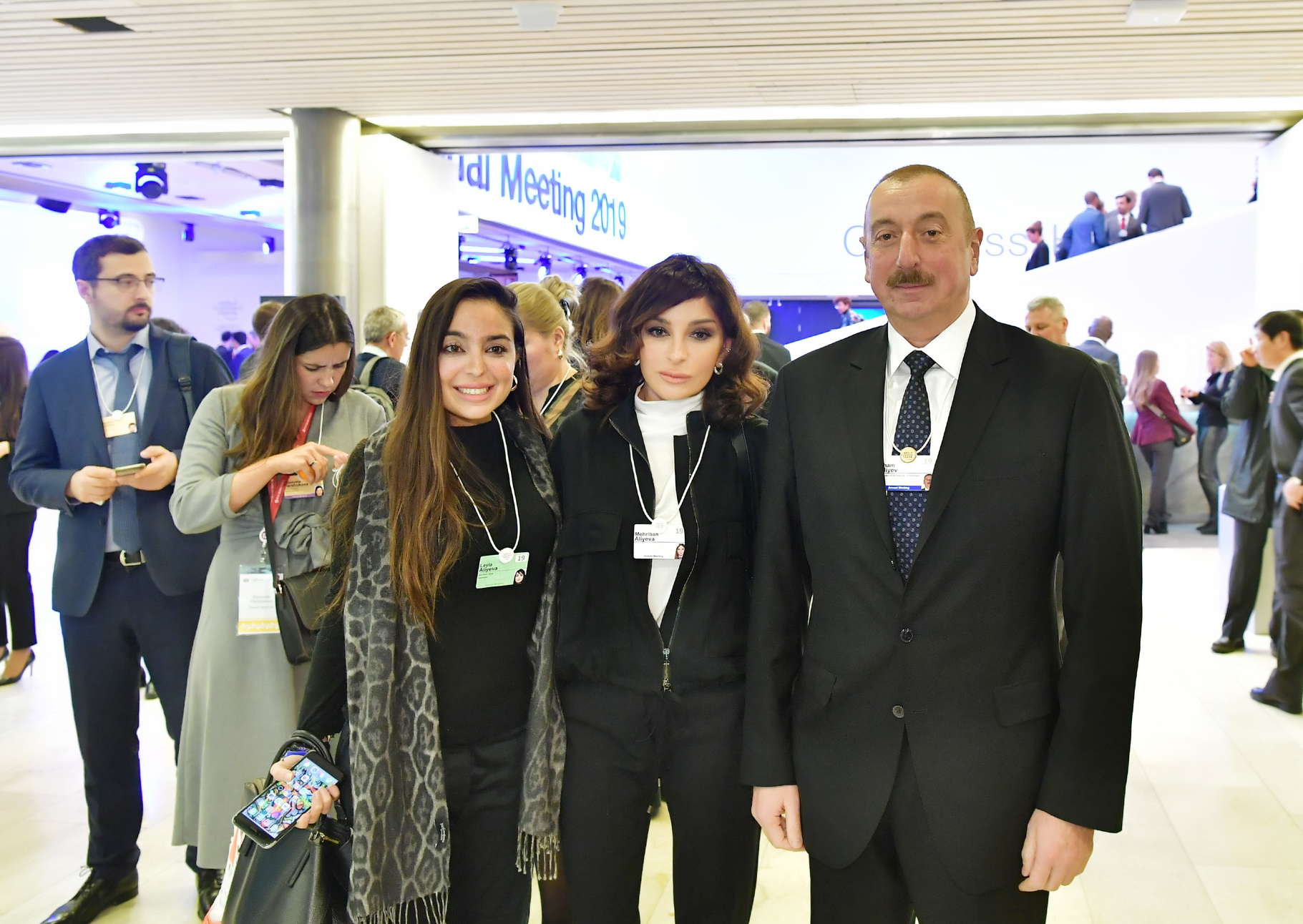
Aliyeva with her husband and daughter Leyla in Davos, 2019

She married Ilham Aliyev, the son of Heydar Aliyev, in Baku on 22 December 1983. The Aliyevs have two daughters, Leyla (born 3 July 1984) and Arzu (born 23 January 1989), and a son, Heydar (born 3 August 1997). Leyla is the editor of Baku magazine, published by Azerbaijani Russian businessman Aras Agalarov, and was married to his son Emin Agalarov.

Aliyeva has undergone extensive plastic surgery. Leaked diplomatic cables dating from a 2008 visit to Baku reveal that US officials were unable to immediately distinguish the First Lady from her two daughters Arzu and Leyla due to the extensive operations, and worded that Aliyeva "has problems showing a full range of facial expressions, following substantial cosmetic surgery, [done] presumably overseas" and "wears dresses that would be considered provocative even in the Western world".

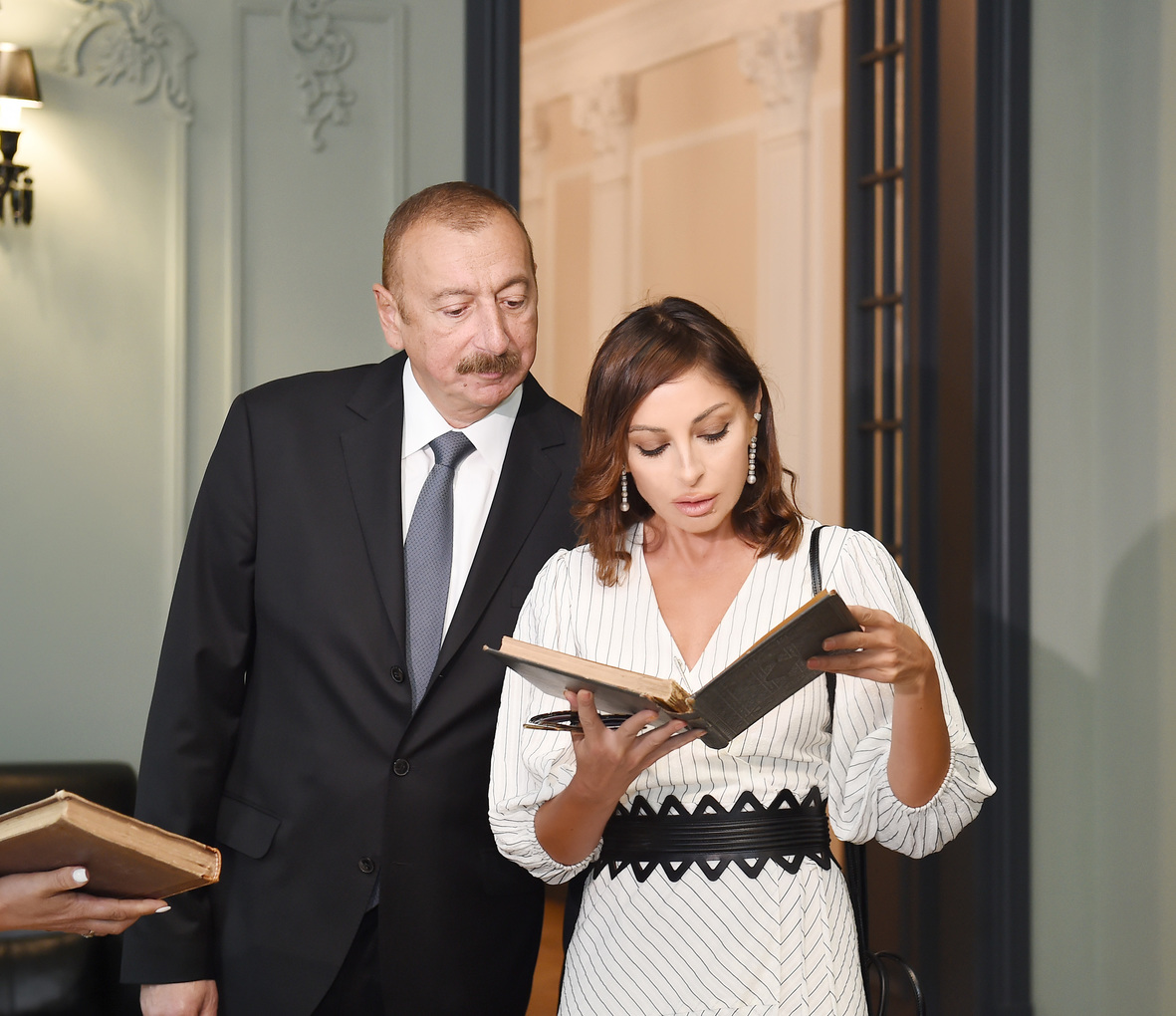
At the opening of Baku Book Center

== Awards and honours ==
=== National honours and medals ===
- Azerbaijan – The Public Figure of 2004
- Azerbaijan – Heydar Aliyev Order
- Azerbaijan – The Person of 2005
- Azerbaijan – Woman of Year (2005)
- Azerbaijan – The Person of 2015
- Azerbaijan – Cossack Glory
- Azerbaijan – Academician Mikayil Huseynov Medal (2017)
- Azerbaijan – Uzeir Hajibeyli honorary medal

=== Foreign honours ===
- France – Legion of Honour
- Kuwait – Honorary Diploma of the State of Kuwait
- Pakistan – Hilal-e-Pakistan
- Poland – Order of Merit of the Republic of Poland
- Serbia – Sretenjski Orden
- Russia – 'Ruby Cross' Order of Philanthropists of the Century International Charity Foundation of Russia
- Russia – Golden Heart International Award
- Russia – Order of "For Services to Astrakhan Region"
- Switzerland – Gold Medal of the Crans Montana Forum
- Switzerland – "Prix de la Fondation" Prize of the Crans Montana Forum
- Pakistan – "The Symbol of Humanism - The Person of 2012"
- Pakistan – Martyr Benazir Bhutto Woman Perfection Prize - 2013
- Greece – Elpida Award
- Hungary – Commander's Cross Order of Merit of the Republic of Hungary
- Bulgaria – Diploma of an honorary citizen of Veliko Tyrnovo
- Russia – Saint Princess Olga Order of 2nd degree of the Russian Orthodox Church
- Italy – Knight Grand Cross of the Order of Merit of the Italian Republic (12 July 2018)
- Russia – Order of Friendship (13 August 2019)
- Vatican – Order of Pope Pius IX, Dame Grand Cross (22 February 2020)

==== International organizations ====
- UNESCO Goodwill Ambassador
- Goodwill Ambassador of ISESCO
- Ihsan Doğramacı Family Health Foundation Prize
- UNESCO Mozart Medal
- High Order of the European Olympic Committee

=== Honorary degrees ===
- Bulgaria – Honorary doctor of the Veliko Tarnovo University
- Russia – Honorary Professor of the I.M. Sechenov First Moscow State Medical University
- Israel – Honorary doctor of the Israel Medical Academy

== Notes ==
Honorary titles
Preceded by Halima Aliyeva	First Lady of Azerbaijan; 2003–present	Incumbent
Political offices
New title	First Vice President of Azerbaijan; 2017–present	Incumbent
