= First Lady of Azerbaijan =

Spouse of the president of Azerbaijan

- Azərbaycanın birinci xanımı
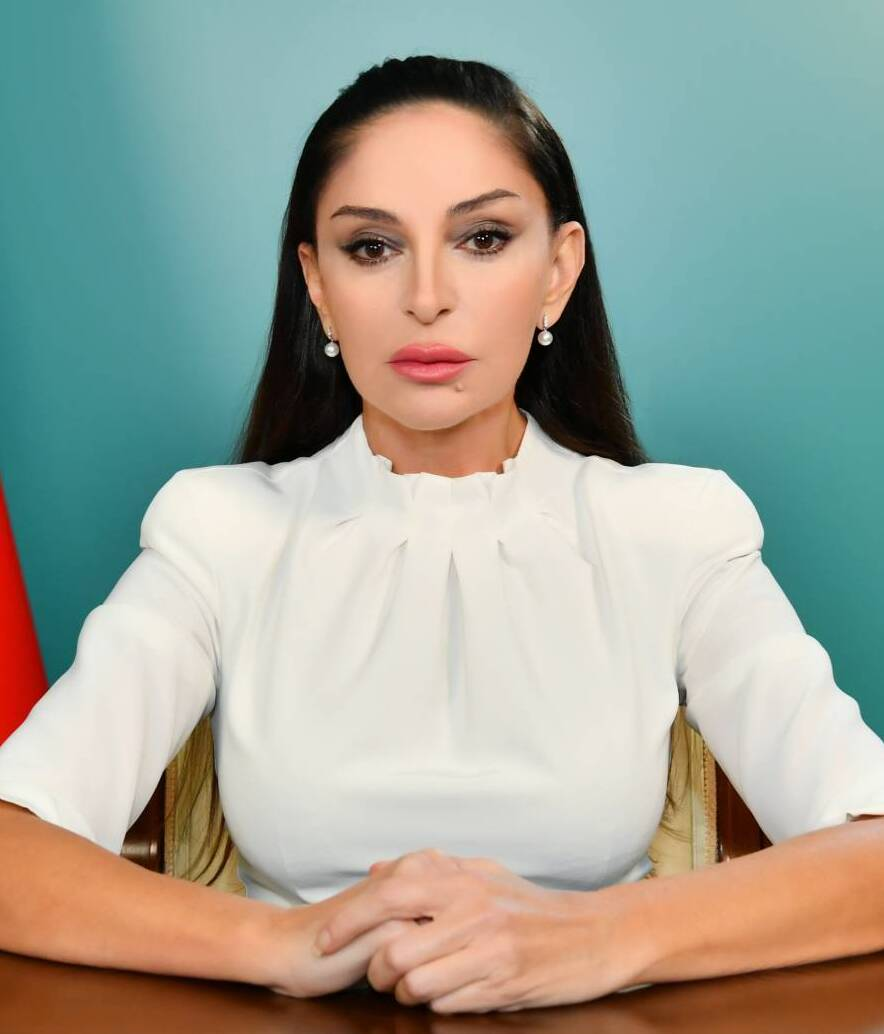
- Current; Mehriban Aliyeva since 31 October 2003
- Residence: -
- Term length: -
- Inaugural holder: Adila Mutallibova
- Formation: 30 August 1991
- Website: -

First Lady of Azerbaijan (Azerbaijani: Azərbaycanın birinci xanımı) is the informal title of the wife of the president of Azerbaijan. The current first lady, since 31 October 2003, is Mehriban Aliyeva, wife of President Ilham Aliyev.

== First ladies of Azerbaijan ==
First Ladies	Portrait	Term began	Term ended	President of Azerbaijan	Notes
Adila Mutallibova		30 August 1991	6 March 1992	Ayaz Mutallibov	
Aziza Mammadova		6 March 1992	14 May 1992	Yagub Mammadov (acting)	
Adila Mutallibova		14 May 1992	18 May 1992	Ayaz Mutallibov	
Aida Bagirova		19 May 1992	16 June 1992	Isa Gambar (acting)	
Halima Aliyeva		16 June 1992	1 September 1993	Abulfaz Elchibey	
Position vacant		3 October 1993	31 October 2003	Heydar Aliyev	Aliyev's wife, Zarifa Aliyeva, died in 1985
Mehriban Aliyeva		31 October 2003	Present	Ilham Aliyev	
