= Gulargate =

Political corruption scandal in Azerbaijan

Gulargate was a 2012–2013 political corruption scandal in Azerbaijan involving civil servants and government officials of various levels, serving in positions as high as the National Assembly of Azerbaijan and the Presidential Administration. It flared up on 25 September 2012 after Azerbaijani lawyer and former university rector Elshad Abdullayev (now residing in France) posted a hidden camera video on YouTube showing his meeting with Member of Parliament Gular Ahmadova negotiating a bribe to secure a seat in the National Assembly for Abdullayev in the 2005 parliamentary election. The scandal widened after a series of similar videos involving other officials and other cases of corruption were posted by Abdullayev at later dates, followed by sackings, arrests and deaths of some of those who appeared in the videos.

The name "Gulargate" derives from the first name of now former MP Gular Ahmadova who appeared in the very first video. It was coined by Azerbaijani media on the day following the release of the first video by analogy with the Watergate scandal of the 1970s. The term was later republished and used by English-language media outlets and in the corruption report of the PACE Committee on Legal Affairs and Human Rights. Despite the term coinage, most videos are related to the kidnapping of Elshad Abdullayev's brother Mahir Abdullayev and not to Gular Ahmadova.

== Background ==
Elshad Abdullayev, who holds a doctorate degree in jurisprudence, had been known as the rector of the Azerbaijan International University which functioned from 1997 to 2010 and for the last four years was a focus of investigation of the Attorney General's Office over reported cases of corruption and illegal student admission. In 2003, Abdullayev's older brother Mahir Abdullayev, an officer of the Ministry of State Security, was kidnapped, and a state investigation which linked his disappearance to the criminal activity of the gang led by Haji Mammadov did not yield any results.

In 2005, Elshad Abdullayev ran as a candidate from the ruling New Azerbaijan Party for a seat in the National Assembly of Azerbaijan. The results in the Binagadi II constituency which he wished to represent were announced as void and a by-election was scheduled for 2006. However, after being found guilty of bribing potential voters during his campaign, Abdullayev was stripped of his candidacy. Abdullayev, who believed he had in fact won, later blamed "certain powers" who allegedly did not wish for him to find out the truth behind his brother's kidnapping; the information he believed he could have accessed, had he been elected in the parliament. According to him, he had managed to collect information about a "gang of criminals" related to the kidnapping and submitted it to the Ministry of National Security and the Attorney General's Office in 2008 and 2009.

In a 7 December 2012 interview to Radio Liberty, Abdullayev said he had been forced to abandon his plan to win a seat in the parliament back in 2006 under pressure from the Presidential Administration. Abdullayev had allegedly been told that the US Embassy demanded from the government of Azerbaijan that an opposition party candidate be given a chance to win a seat. Since the Musavat party leader Isa Gambar, according to Abdullayev's recount, "could not be let into the parliament", the choice fell on Arzu Samadbeyli who ran from Abdullayev's constituency representing Musavat. The US Embassy in Azerbaijan denied these allegations.

== Video postings ==
In September 2012, Elshad Abdullayev appeared with a statement, saying that back in 2005 he had paid 2,000,000 US dollars' worth of a bribe requested from him by the state officials in return for finding his kidnapped brother and securing for Elshad Abdullayev himself a seat in the government in the upcoming parliamentary election. Abdullayev claimed to have paid it to the head of the Presidential Administration Ramiz Mehdiyev and that Member of Parliament Gular Ahmadova served as the intermediary. Abdullayev alleged the officials never acted on the agreement and did not return his money. Following these statements, Ahmadova accused Abdullayev of slander.

In response, Elshad Abdullayev posted his first footage on YouTube on 25 September 2012. The video featured himself, Member of Parliament Gular Ahmadova and her friend Sevinj Babayeva, sitting in an office and discussing events around the 2005 parliamentary election. Ahmadova is heard mentioning a prior arrangement made with Abdullayev and promising him a seat in the government in return for money. Abdullayev offers US$500,000, but Ahmadova insists that he pay US$1,000,000. During the conversation, Abdullayev attempts several times to get Ahmadova to mention Ramiz Mehdiyev as the eventual collector of the bribe, but she never explicitly confirms that.

The video caused a major uproar in the local media. Ahmadova first claimed the video was a hoax and refused to make any further comments on it. She later admitted being in the video, but said the money discussed in fact referred to the restitution sum that Abdullayev had owed students of his defunct university and that Ahmadova pressured him to give her that money, so she would redistribute it among them accordingly. She voluntarily resigned as Member of Parliament, so as not to "hinder the investigation". Despite this, she came under fire of offensive criticism from fellow members of the New Azerbaijan Party and felt the need to address herself to the President (the head of the party) in order for the insults to stop. Abdullayev said he was receiving threats after publishing the video.

Abdullayev released another video on 6 October 2012, in which Gular Ahmadova is heard talking about various high-ranking government officials compiling lists of MP candidates which they would like to see in the National Assembly following the election. Among those in charge of compiling these lists, she mentions Minister of Economic Development Farhad Aliyev, Minister of Health Ali Insanov (both arrested on the eve of the 2005 election for planning a coup d'état and sentenced to imprisonment), Minister of Emergency Situations Kamaladdin Heydarov, head of the Presidential Administration Ramiz Mehdiyev, President Ilham Aliyev, and First Lady Mehriban Aliyeva. Sevinj Babayeva confirms this in the video, which together with the first video appears to be a fragment of a single conversation. In the video, Gular Ahmadova also warns Abdullayev that there have been cases of "letting in MPs who would go on working with Ali Insanov and Hajibala (sic), so this time those MPs would not be let in".

In the next video released on 21 October 2012, Abdullayev is seen with someone who calls himself Rovshan Abbasguliyev, a Ministry of Internal Affairs employee in the Seventh Division responsible for secret services. It is mentioned that there has been no progress in finding Mahir Abdullayev. The alleged Ministry employee admits that Mahir Abdullayev is kept in the Head Department against Organized Crime and that it is a normal practice for the department to "catch a person, shove them into a car and then notify their [family] that they're in the department". In the video, Elshad Abdullayev also inquires into the possibility of having his nephew hired by the Ministry of Internal Affairs. The employee says this is possible for a bribe of 10,000 to 15,000 AZN.

An Interior Ministry official Ehsan Zahidov confirmed that Rovshan Abbasguliyev indeed worked for the Seventh Division but was fired in 2008 for "serious violations of the work code". Zahidov noted that statements of a fired employee cannot possibly cast shadow on the Ministry or the Minister. Nevertheless, he promised that the issue would be looked into in light of the new evidence.

In early November 2012, three people were arrested with regard to Mahir Abdullayev's case, among them former assistant of the First Deputy of the Prime Minister of Azerbaijan Vagif Huseynov and businessman Arzu Kazimov. It was announced that these two had received a total of almost US$4 million from Elshad Abdullayev after promising to help him find his kidnapped brother.

In the fourth video, which Abdullayev released on 18 November 2012 and dated 2007, he is shown talking with a person who claims to be then chief justice of the Narimanov rayon court Aghababa Babayev. The latter promises "assistance" to Abdullayev in finding his brother. Babayev did not deny having a conversation with Abdullayev, but alleged he had not said some of the things heard in the video and that the video must have been edited.

The fifth video came on 14 December 2012, where Abdullayev is having a conversation with Gular Ahmadova's friend Sevinj Babayeva alone. The video is said to have been made in the aftermath of the 2005 parliamentary election. Babayeva reveals to Abdullayev that following a phone call from Gular Ahmadova, Ramiz Mehdiyev arranged for police groups to arrive at her constituency and "take measures" to secure her victory and that this was done immediately. Babayeva also told Abdullayev not to worry, as she "saw [Ramiz Mehdiyev] accepting the money with her own eyes" and that Mehdiyev has the final say in whatever happens.

Commenting on this, Gular Ahmadova's former opposition rival Eldar Namazov confirmed that in 2005 the police had attacked his observers in four polling stations and destroyed their protocols. The next day, they did the same at six more polling stations, according to Namazov, which allowed Ahmadova to announce her victory.

In the next video, published on 25 December 2012, Abdullayev is seen talking to Rovshana Aliyeva whom he claimed to be the personal assistant of businessman Arzu Kazimov, one of the three people detained with regard to Mahir Abdullayev's case in November 2012. In the video, she gives a call to a person named Zaur who, according to her, is the son of Arzu Kazimov and a "super guy" and who can help sort out Elshad Abdullayev's problems "in no time" on behalf of Arzu Kazimov. The Attorney General's Office later accused Kazimov of accepting US$1.5 million from Abdullayev for promising to set his brother free through his "connections" in the government. Responding to the video posting, Rovshana Aliyeva made a statement saying she had nothing to do with Arzu Kazimov and claimed Elshad Abdullayev had threatened her with a gun a number of times. During a court hearing on 16 July 2013, Rovshana Aliyeva admitted she had passed Arzu Kazimov's contacts to Elshad Abdullayev through the latter's younger brother Eldaniz who was also her acquaintance. She claimed being offered 30,000 AZN by Abdullayev in return for testifying against Arzu Kazimov in court and declining the offer.

The following video, which was made in 2004, according to Abdullayev, and released on 21 January 2013, featured Arzu Kazimov talking in his office with Elshad Abdullayev and Mahir Abdullayev's father-in-law journalist Shamil Shahmammadov, chief executive of the AzerTaj news agency. Abdullayev claimed that this video is a proof of Kazimov serving as a "cashier" of the "death squadron" which kidnapped his brother.

Abdullayev published another video on 20 February 2013. Dated 2004, it shows himself discussing his brother's fate with Rasim Ildyrymzadeh, assistant chief of the Heydar Aliyev Airport police department and a distant relative of the Interior Minister Ramil Usubov. In the video, Ildyrymzadeh repeatedly reassures Abdullayev, who seems in doubt, that his brother is alive and well and due to be released at the end of the month. Following the publication of the video, Ildyrymzadeh said he had told Abdullayev what he knew at the time and never asked him for a bribe. He accused Abdullayev of being well informed of the details of his brother's kidnapping and even playing his role in it. The videos, Ildyrymzadeh alleged, were simply discussions of the facts that all involved parties were aware of.

The next video from August 2004 released soon afterwards featured a man alleged to be the president's bodyguard named Saftar Kalantarov. Kalantarov demands US$3,000 from Abdullayev to fly to Saint Petersburg. As for Mahir Abdullayev's whereabouts, Kalantarov says he is held somewhere in Chechnya and promises to bring back video and photographs proving Abdullayev is alive and well.

In the following video filmed in 2009 Elshad Abdullayev is seen submitting what he claimed to be a package containing all the records of payments he made in an attempt to locate his brother to a Ministry of National Security employee Rasul Rasulov and the latter signing for it.

On 20 March 2013, Abdullayev published three more videos at once, all from the same period in 2007. People who introduced themselves as Ministry of National Security officers say they are willing to help Elshad Abdullayev in finding his brother. They claim that Mahir Abdullayev was not kidnapped, but arrested following complaints from his fellow officers. According to them, he is currently in custody in the Ministry under a different name. To have him released, they continue, Elshad Abdullayev needs to get in touch with the Minister himself and give him money in return for his brother's release. However, since the Minister is too difficult to contact, they suggest Abdullayev see someone named Sahib. Sahib, in turn, states during the meeting that Mahir Abdullayev has been taken hostage over a woman and that his kidnappers would agree to return him for money, but required safety guarantee.

Abdullayev's next posting came on 26 April 2013, which was the full version of his 2005 conversation with Gular Ahmadova.

Abdullayev released another video on 16 June 2013. In the video, which apparently precedes the very first video featuring Gular Ahmadova, Sevinj Babayeva tells Abdullayev that he needs to pay Ahmadova US$500,000 to secure a seat in the National Assembly. She says that he needs to pay US$500,000 more to have a high position in the government assigned to his brother Mahir Abdullayev. Abdullayev replies he does not have the extra money she asks for, of which Babayeva immediately informs Ahmadova by phone.

The last video was published by Abdullayev on 1 October 2013. In this video, he is seen having a conversation with Sevinj Babayeva alone. Babayeva insists that "this whole thing has to be over by tonight", as "ordered personally by the President". She mentions the names of Ramiz Mehdiyev and Parliament speaker Ogtay Asadov in claiming that they expect Abdullayev to transfer another US$100,000 in return for making his clinic and his university "flourish" and his brother released from captivity. She assures Abdullayev that this time the money will not disappear and "they know perfectly well" that Babayeva knows First Lady Mehriban Aliyeva and her sister Nargiz Pashayeva, whom she can "always complain to". Babayeva says she assumes no responsibility and serves only as an intermediary. She tells Abdullayev that he has been criticized for cooperation with "too many people" on this matter, having gotten the President, Ramiz Mehdiyev and Ogtay Asadov involved in this affair, and for avoiding those that have voluntarily stepped forward to help him. She also quotes Gular Ahmadova in saying that "they [the people who request money from Abdullayev] have given her the life she always dreamed of."

== Government's response ==
Soon after the publishing of the first video, the head of the Presidential Administration Ramiz Mehdiyev, who was described by Abdullayev as the puppet master of the elections, made a public statement on 3 October 2012, saying that the mentioning of his name in the video is someone's "well-thought out provocation" and that "such troublemakers will be punished regardless of who they are". Regarding Abdullayev's accusation of rigging the election under pressure from the US Embassy, Mehdiyev said this "a product of his sick mind" and that Abdullayev is "no one" for him to discuss these issues with.

Members of the ruling New Azerbaijan Party described the authors and participants of the videos as "fraudsters" and emphasized the provocative nature of the video postings. Others called on to view this case as legal and not political.

Finally, on 7 March 2013, Abdullayev himself was charged with attempted crime and bribe giving. It was said that Abdullayev voluntarily paid Vagif Huseynov (one of the three men arrested in November 2012) US$1 million to make use of the latter's connections in the Cabinet of Ministers. The money allegedly had already been returned to Abdullayev. Vagif Huseynov himself was sentenced to four years on 22 May 2013.

== Death of Sevinj Babayeva ==
Sevinj Babayeva, born 1973, was a friend of Gular Ahmadova's. She held a Ph.D. degree in law and was the editor and parliament reporter for the newspaper Kheyr va Shar in the late 1990s. At the time of the scandal, Babayeva was the director of the Sabir Library in Baku. Less than a month after the release of the first video, Babayeva was fired from her post. A library official said Babayeva's contract had expired and the library chose not to renew it due to "flaws in Babayeva's work". It is noteworthy that at the time of being fired, Babayeva had been outside of Azerbaijan for nearly a month.

After the release of the video in which she is having a one-on-one conversation with Elshad Abdullayev and repeatedly mentions Ramiz Mehdiyev's name, it was announced that Babayeva had disappeared. On 24 December 2012, the Attorney General's Office initiated an international search through Interpol on an unrelated case of fraud allegedly committed by Babayeva in 2009.

On 28 December 2012, Azerbaijani media outlets reported that Sevinj Babayeva had died in Istanbul, Turkey. An official investigation later revealed that Babayeva had left Azerbaijan on the insistence of Gular Ahmadova following the release of the first video in September. Ahmadova paid for Babayeva's flight and stay, and a Turkish citizen named Selçuk Ağlayan met Babayeva at the airport in Istanbul. Sevinj Babayeva introduced herself as Meryem Solmaz and from that point on was known by that name. She had been complaining of heart problems since 16 November 2012, receiving treatment at various clinics. On 28 December 2012, she finally checked in the Medicana International Istanbul Hospital where she was taken by Ağlayan. Babayeva was admitted with cardiovascular and pulmonary collapse, of which she died later that day.

Babayeva's son Aykhan Mammadov said he held Gular Ahmadova responsible for his mother's death. In his accusations, he even went as far as suggesting Ahmadova had poisoned Sevinj Babayeva. The Attorney General's Office later did confirm Babayeva's departure on Ahmadova's insistence, but an autopsy did not reveal signs of poisoning.

== Gular Ahmadova's trial ==
Gular Ahmadova was arrested on 13 February 2013 while attempting to leave for Georgia. According to her lawyers, Ahmadova was on her way to receive medical treatment there. She was charged with embezzlement and failure to report a grave offence and pleaded not guilty. Her official website was shut down, along with the newspaper Markaz which she had founded in 1998. According to Ahmadova's lawyers, her physical and psychological state deteriorated while in custody. She refused to give any testimony till Elshad Abdullayev was tried. The defence claimed the videos had been edited and insisted on the fact that the recording constituted a violation of privacy. The court overruled the defence's request for an expert's opinion with regard to the authenticity of the recordings. The attorney requested a sentence of four years. The court found Ahmadova guilty on all counts and on 2 December 2013 sentenced her to three years in custody. In January 2014, the Baku Court of Appeal upheld this decision. However, Ahmadova was released 14 months later, on 5 May 2014, after her sentence was suspended. Elshad Abdullayev commented on this decision by calling the Gulargate legal process "a court show that went to demonstrate once again the lawless nature of Azerbaijani courts."

Several weeks after Ahmadova's release, Sevinj Babayeva's son Aykhan Mammadov was accused of shoplifting, arrested and sentenced to three and a half years in custody, but was released after exactly one month following the verdict's overruling by the Baku Court of Appeal.

== Akif Chovdarov's role ==
In April 2013, Elshad Abdullayev wrote an open letter with regard to his brother's disappearance, in which he named an alleged perpetrator, Akif Chovdarov, a general of the Ministry of National Security. Elshad Abdullayev described Chovdarov as the "top leader of the criminal gang of kidnappers". According to him, Chovdarov demanded that Mahir Abdullayev pay him US$2 million in order to keep silent about Abdullayev spending leisure time with popular singer Matanat Isgandarli at Garabulag, the infamous private resort in northern Azerbaijan where Colonel Haji Mammadov detained and murdered those he kidnapped. The letter then talks about Chovdarov succeeding at kidnapping Mahir Abdullayev with the help of Matanat Isgandarli in October 2003.

Elshad Abdullayev described Akif Chovdarov as a person who indulges every order and desire of the highest-ranking government officials. Abdullayev claims that in addition to kidnappings and killings, Chovdarov, who also has Russian citizenship, runs a profitable wood business in the Sverdlovsk Oblast, Russia, on behalf of the said officials, despite not being supposed to engage in business being a National Security officer.

Abdullayev named Akif Chovdarov as the person behind the assassinations of Elmar Huseynov (which was previously also claimed by Eynulla Fatullayev) and Rafiq Tağı and the assault and intimidation of opposition journalists Agil Khalil and Khadija Ismayilova.

In November 2015, General Chovdarov was fired and later arrested following the government's unrelated crackdown on corruption and extortion among high-ranking officials of the Ministry of National Security.

== Expert opinion ==
Political scientist Arastun Orujlu of the Sharg-Garb Research Centre described the scandal as a result of an ongoing struggle for power between various political clans.

Lawyer Ayyub Karimov thinks the delay in locating Mahir Abdullayev stems from the fact that the people involved in the kidnapping have powerful connections in the government or police forces. He likened it to the series of kidnappings orchestrated by Haji Mammadov, an officer of the Internal Affairs Ministry, in 2005.
