= State Housing Construction Agency (Azerbaijan) =

SHCA under President of Azerbaijan (in Azerbaijani: MIDA - Mənzil İnşaatı Dövlət Agentliyi) is a central executive authority that established to effectively utilize the funds allocated for the construction of multistory residential buildings, and provide the low and middle income citizens and young families of the Republic of Azerbaijan with preferential housing. It also implements state policy and regulation in urban planning, design and architecture. Samir Nuriyev is the head of the agency.

== History ==
The agency was set up on 11 April 2016 based on a presidential decree which initially aims to construct buildings that cost less for Azerbaijani citizens while considering protection of environment and requirements of modern architectural style. On November 24, 2016, State Housing Development Agency Legal Entity established based on another presidential decree which operates under SHCA. The Charter of the State Housing Development Agency of the Republic of Azerbaijan was approved on 7 February 2017 based on Decree of the President of the Republic of Azerbaijan No 1819.

== Projects ==
The Hovsan residential complex will be built in Surakhani district, near the town of Hovsan which is approximately 2 km far from Caspian Sea. The complex is expected to comprise 11 multi-family buildings that will have 2962 apartment (280 are single room, 1401 are two-room, 980 are triples, and 301 are four-room apartments).

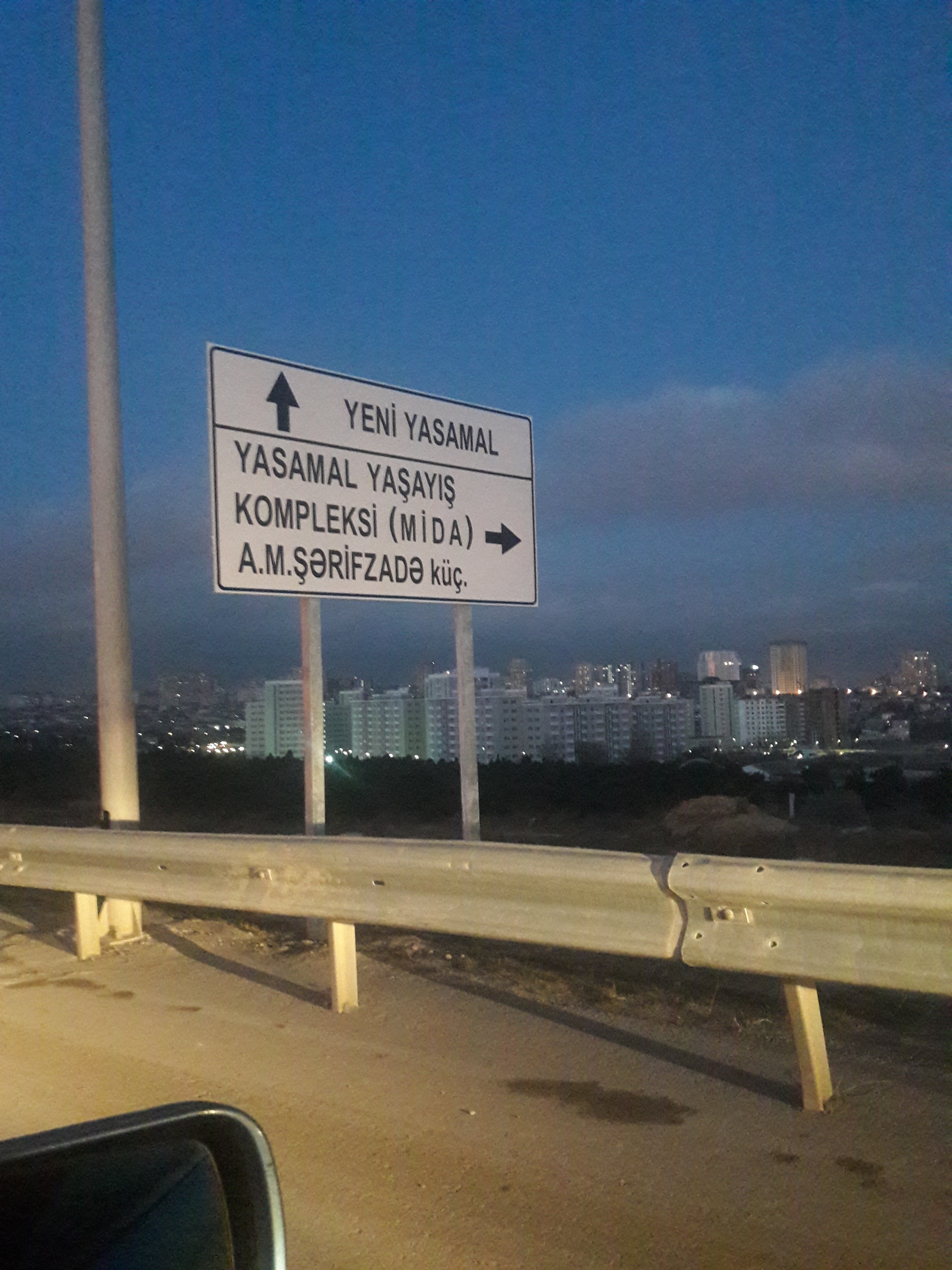

Yasamal residential complex comprises total number of 29 buildings which consisted of 1843 apartments. There will be also school building and kindergarten. The complex will be built over 11.6 ha area.
