= Gular Ahmadova =

Azerbaijani politician (born 1965)

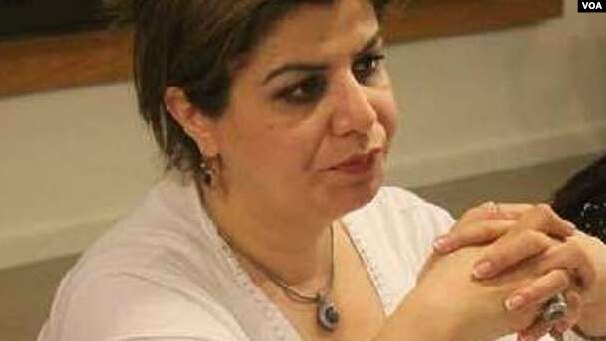

Member of the Azerbaijan Parliament for Khatai II
- In office 5 November 2000 – 4 October 2012
- Preceded by: Igbal Aghazadeh
- Succeeded by: Fuad Muradov

Personal details
- Born: Gular Mikayil qizi Aliyeva; 20 August 1965 (age 61) Baku, Azerbaijan
- Party: New Azerbaijan Party (until 2013); Modern Equality Party (from 2020)
- Spouse: Fikrat Ahmadov
- Children: 3
- Education: Azerbaijan State Pedagogical University
- Profession: mathematician, psychologist
- Committees: International and Interparliamentary Relations Committee, EU—Azerbaijan Parliament Cooperation Committee
- Website: www.gularahmadova.com (now defunct)

Gular Mikayil qizi Ahmadova (Azerbaijani: Gülər Əhmədova), née Aliyeva (born 20 August 1965 in Baku), is a retired Azerbaijani politician, former member of the National Assembly of Azerbaijan and former member of the ruling New Azerbaijan Party.

She gained notoriety in 2012 after a video shot on a hidden camera was released, featuring Ahmadova negotiating a bribe sum with lawyer and fellow party member Elshad Abdullayev to help arrange, among other things, his election to the Azerbaijani parliament. The corruption scandal that ensued became known as Gulargate (by analogy with the Watergate scandal) and led to Ahmadova's stepping down as an MP and later arrest and expulsion from the party. She was sentenced to three years in prison for embezzlement and failure to report a grave offence, but her prison term was suspended 14 months into the sentence.

== Early life and family ==
Gular Ahmadova was born in Baku, the oldest of the family's four children, but raised chiefly by her grandmother. Ahmadova's father was originally from the village of Nardaran near Baku, while her mother was a native of Shamakhy. In 1986, she graduated with honors from the Azerbaijan State Pedagogical Institute with a degree in mathematics. For the next eight years, she worked as a teacher and vice-principal at various educational institutions. Ahmadova holds a master's degree in psychology. She taught at Baku State University until her arrest. 1994 marked the beginning of her career as a civil servant when she was employed by the Ministry of Youth and Sports of Azerbaijan first as a chief training manager, then as head of a department, and finally as head of the administration. In 1996, she became chair of the Children's Organization of Azerbaijan.

Ahmadova met her future husband, Fikrat Ahmadov, at the university, and the two got married in 1985. They have three children. Fikrat Ahmadov worked as head of the advertisement department for the national broadcaster AzTV from 1995 to 2012. He reportedly "resigned of his own free will" following the corruption scandal involving his wife.

== Political career ==
A member of the New Azerbaijan Party, which has been in power in Azerbaijan since 1993, Gular Ahmadova, decisively won seats in the National Assembly in three consecutive parliamentary elections: in 2000, 2005 and 2010, representing the Yasamal I and lately Khatai II constituency. In a hidden-camera video published in the course of the Gulargate scandal, Ahmadova's friend Sevinj Babayeva claimed that in 2005, the head of the Presidential Administration Ramiz Mehdiyev arranged for police groups to arrive at Ahmadova's constituency and "take measures" to secure her victory. This was later confirmed by Ahmadova's opposition rival Eldar Namazov who said his observers in ten polling stations had been attacked by the police and their protocols destroyed. The issue remained unaddressed following Ahmadova's arrest.

During her parliament membership, she proved herself a vehement critic of both the opposition and her fellow ruling party members, and described herself as "a Heydar Aliyev follower". In a 2006 interview, she accused the then recently sacked and imprisoned Health Minister, Ali Insanov, of giving Azerbaijani children up for illegal adoption abroad.

She was known as an advocate for children's rights and one of the few members of parliament who openly voiced their concern with regard to the frequent non-combat deaths among new conscripts in the Azerbaijani army in the early 2010s. She was also known to have opposed the passing of a law decriminalizing libel, stating that it would encourage vigilante justice.

== 2009 assault incident ==
On 18 April 2009, Ahmadova was physically assaulted by two unnamed females who showed up at her house late in the evening. The incident was reported to the police, but Ahmadova refused to comment on it. The police told the media that the incident was property-related.

== Khural newspaper trial ==
On the night of 28 October 2011, the editor-in-chief of the newspaper Khural Avaz Zeynally was arrested after Gular Ahmadova submitted audio materials to the police alleging that Zeynally had been blackmailing her for 10,000 AZN in return for not publishing controversial material about Ahmadova's corruption activity (which later became known as the Gulargate scandal). Zeynally claimed that the voice on the recording did not belong to him. He accused Ahmadova of brokering his persecution by the state. After the release of the first Gulargate video, Zeynally said there were obvious parallels between his case and the scandal. He claimed to be harassed soon after Elshad Abdullayev submitted a complaint to the Attorney General's against Gular Ahmadova in July 2011. According to Zeynally, Ahmadova contacted him personally in October 2011 asking him "not to publish any information against her that he may be given".

Despite no other evidence having been brought against Zeynally, he remained in custody. On 12 March 2013, he was sentenced to nine years in prison. Zeynally appealed the verdict.

Zeynally was pardoned and released on 30 December 2014, almost eight months after Ahmadova's sentence was suspended.

== Gulargate scandal ==
On 25 September 2012, ex-rector of the Azerbaijan International University (which was stripped of its license and closed down in 2010), Elshad Abdullayev, who currently resides in France, posted a video on YouTube, dated 2005, in which a hidden camera captured a conversation involving himself, Gular Ahmadova, and her friend Sevinj Babayeva in what appears to be an office room. During the sixteen-and-a-half-minute long footage, the three are seen and heard negotiating a price that Abdullayev is expected to pay in return for being given a seat in the National Assembly of Azerbaijan as an MP. In the video, Abdullayev offers to pay 500,000 USD, while Ahmadova insists on 1,000,000. In the video, Abdullayev repeatedly tries to get Ahmadova to admit that the money will go directly to the Head of the Presidential Administration of Azerbaijan Republic Ramiz Mehdiyev, though she never openly confirms that.

Ahmadova initially denied being in the video and laid counter-accusations of bribery against Abdullayev. Later Ahmadova and Babayeva made a statement that the money discussed in the video referred, in fact, to the student tuition fees misappropriated by Abdullayev after the closing down of the International University which they, as mediators, were urging him to redistribute to the former students. Gular Ahmadova stepped down as an MP in order "not to hinder the investigation".

In the next video released on 6 October 2012, Gular Ahmadova is heard talking about various high-ranking government officials compiling lists of MP candidates whom they would like to see in the National Assembly following the election. Among them, she mentions Minister of Economic Development Farhad Aliyev, Minister of Health Ali Insanov (both arrested on the eve of the 2005 election for planning a coup d'état and sentenced to imprisonment), Minister of Emergency Situations Kamaladdin Heydarov, head of the Presidential Administration Ramiz Mehdiyev, President Ilham Aliyev, and First Lady Mehriban Aliyeva. Sevinj Babayeva confirms this in the video, which, together with the first video, appears to be a fragment of a single conversation.

On 13 December 2012, Abdullayev released another video, in which he is seen speaking with Ahmadova's friend Sevinj Babayeva one-on-one. In the video, Babayeva claims that "Ramiz is behind this all" and "has the final say". She also reveals the details of Gular Ahmadova's win against Eldar Namazov in the 2005 parliamentary election through police involvement orchestrated by the said "Ramiz" to target Namazov's supporters at the polling station and changes made to the final election protocol for the constituency.

On 14 December 2012, the primary regional assembly of the New Azerbaijan Party voted in favour of expelling Ahmadova from the party.

Sevinj Babayeva, who fled to Istanbul, Turkey after the release of the first video, was reported to have died of heart failure after checking in at a clinic on 26 December. Babayeva's son said he did not believe his mother had died of a heart problem and accused Ahmadova of having Babayeva poisoned after persuading her to escape to Istanbul and funding her trip and stay. The Attorney General's Office later did confirm Babayeva's departure on Ahmadova's insistence, but the autopsy did not reveal signs of poisoning.

== Arrest, trial, and imprisonment ==
Gular Ahmadova was arrested on 13 February 2013 while attempting to leave for Georgia. According to her lawyers, Ahmadova was on her way to receive medical treatment there. She was charged with embezzlement and failure to report a grave offence. She pleaded not guilty. Her official website was shut down, along with the newspaper Markaz which she had founded in 1998. On 5 July 2013, the Central Election Commission announced there would be no by-election held to fill the vacant seat following Ahmadova's resignation.

According to Ahmadova's lawyers, her physical and psychological state deteriorated while in custody. She refused to give any testimony till Elshad Abdullayev was tried, and alleged the videos had been edited. She was found guilty on all counts and, on 2 December 2013, sentenced to three years in custody. The relatively mild verdict was ruled considering the fact that Ahmadova had previously had a clear criminal record, had been three-time elected parliament member, had engaged in charitable work, was suffering from unnamed health conditions and was a parent of an underage child. In January 2014, the Baku Court of Appeal upheld this decision.

== Release and later life ==
On 5 May 2014, the Court of Appeal held a hearing, following which Ahmadova's sentence was suspended and she was released immediately, having thus served 14 months of her sentence in custody. She continued to claim her innocence. The decision was heavily criticised by opposition members. Legal expert Aslan Ismayilov questioned the validity of Gular Ahmadova's mild sentence for embezzling a large sum of money in comparison with the sentence of the opposition youth activist Ilkin Rustamzadeh charged with hooliganism and organising unauthorised protests, a much less grave offence, and sentenced to eight years in custody in 2014. Elshad Abdullayev commented on Ahmadova's release by referring to the whole legal process as "a court show that went to demonstrate once again the lawless nature of Azerbaijani courts."

In an August 2015 interview, Ahmadova, without offering a specific date, admitted that she had been on the brink of committing suicide during "the most difficult times" of her life. In late 2015, Ahmadova filed an appeal in order to have herself cleared of all charges, but on 16 February 2016, after she had failed twice to show up for a hearing, the court refused to rule in her favour.

In February 2020, Ahmadova's son, 33, was arrested for criminal possession of a weapon.
