= 2025 Azerbaijani coup plot =

Failed coup attempt in Asia

- Part of the Post-Soviet conflicts
Date	January 2025
Location	Baku, Azerbaijan
Result	Coup plot foiled

Belligerents
State Council of Azerbaijan Supported by: Russia	Government of Azerbaijan

Commanders and leaders
(Azerbaijan) Ramiz Mehdiyev	(Azerbaijan) Ilham Aliyev
- Six people, including Mehdiyev, were detained

The 2025 Azerbaijani coup plot was an alleged coup d'état plot to overthrow the government of Azerbaijan, reportedly involving senior members of the Azerbaijani political establishment. The plot was allegedly led by Ramiz Mehdiyev, a longtime political figure who served as Head of the Presidential Administration of Azerbaijan from 1994 to 2019 and later as President of the Azerbaijan National Academy of Sciences.

== Background ==
Ramiz Mehdiyev was a prominent member of the Azerbaijani political elite for decades, serving under both Heydar Aliyev and his son Ilham Aliyev. Known for his pro-Moscow orientation and close connections with the Russian political establishment, Mehdiyev held several influential posts in the Azerbaijani government and academic institutions. His influence in state affairs earned him a reputation as the country's "gray cardinal," controlling much of the bureaucratic machinery from behind the scenes. However, his removal from office in October 2019, amid a reshuffling that favoured figures close to First Vice President Mehriban Aliyeva, marked the beginning of a steep political decline and growing isolation from the ruling elite.

Relations between Azerbaijan and Russia sharply deteriorated in late 2024, following the shootdown of an Azerbaijani civilian airliner by a Russian anti-aircraft missile, which killed 38 people. Azerbaijani President Ilham Aliyev accused Moscow of failing to take responsibility for the incident, leading to a deep freeze in bilateral relations.

In October 2025, Aliyev met with Russian President Vladimir Putin in Dushanbe, Tajikistan, where Putin acknowledged that a Russian missile was responsible for the tragedy and promised compensation to the victims' families. Although Aliyev expressed gratitude and suggested a possible thaw in relations, subsequent developments cast doubt on the durability of the rapprochement.

== Events ==
According to a 16 October 2025 report by Azerbaijani media, Mehdiyev allegedly contacted Russian officials earlier that year, during the Azerbaijani-Russian diplomatic crisis, to propose a provisional state council to replace Aliyev's government. The report claimed Mehdiyev intended to lead the council, and that Russian officials were initially receptive before deeming it unlikely to succeed.

The purported letter suggested reforming the government to improve the country's image, proposing a shift from a presidential to a parliamentary republic with strengthened oversight and reduced authoritarian influence. The State Council would consist of 50 members from various professional backgrounds, overseeing legislative, executive, and judicial functions.

According to Azerbaijani media, Azerbaijani intelligence obtained the letter, which was later published despite legal restrictions. Azerbaijani media also reported that President Putin informed Aliyev of the alleged plot during their October meeting in Dushanbe. Mehdiyev was accused of attempting to seize state power and acquiring property illegally. According to reports, Russian authorities initially expressed interest in his proposal but subsequently determined that its prospects for success were limited.

== Aftermath ==
=== Arrests ===
In October 2025, several pro-government media outlets in Azerbaijan reported that Ramiz Mehdiyev had been charged with money laundering, treason, and attempted coup. A court subsequently placed him under four months of house arrest, pending trial, with the charges carrying a potential sentence of up to 20 years in prison.

On 30 October 2025, Vugar Mammadov, editor-in-chief of Hurriyyet, was detained by the State Security Service (DTX), and some of his belongings and documents were seized, although a search of his home yielded nothing. On the same day, the office of Futbol+, also founded by Mammadov, was raided, and its editor-in-chief, Mahir Rustamli, was detained.

Additionally, Islam Rzayev, head of Azerbaijan's Balakan District, along with several other district officials, was detained by the DTX. President Ilham Aliyev subsequently dismissed Rzayev from his post, which he had held for 14 years.

On 4 November, Eldar Amirov, an aide to Ramiz Mehdiyev, was arrested on charges of attempting a coup d’état.

=== Allegations ===
According to Azerbaijani media reports, around fifty individuals are allegedly linked to Ramiz Mehdiyev's so-called “State Council” network, which is accused of plotting a coup attempt.

- Abbas Abbasov, former first deputy prime minister of Azerbaijan
- Abulfas Garayev, former Minister of Culture of Azerbaijan
- Ali Karimli, leader of the Azerbaijan Popular Front Party
- Ali M. Hasanov, former head of Department on Social Political Issues, Presidential Administration of Azerbaijan
- Azer Gasimov, Azerbaijan Popular Front Party activist
- Eldar Amirov, Ramiz Mehdiyev's aide
- Eldar Mahmudov, former Minister of National Security of Azerbaijan
- Elton Mammadov, former MP and Ziya Mammadov's brother
- Elmar Mammadyarov, former Minister of Foreign Affairs of Azerbaijan
- Gultakin Hajibayli, a former MP who left the ruling New Azerbaijan Party in 2013 and joined the opposition National Council
- Jahangir Hajiyev, former banker
- Jamil Hasanli, leader of National Council of Democratic Forces of Azerbaijan
- Kamal Aliyev, former civil civilian
- Najmeddin Sadikov, former Chief of the General Staff of Azerbaijani Armed Forces
- Ziya Mammadov, former Minister of Transportation of Azerbaijan

== Third-party reactions ==
=== Domestic ===
==== Pro-government figures ====
Following Ramiz Mehdiyev's fall from political prominence, several former government officials sought to distance themselves from him. Among them was Member of Parliament Zahid Oruj, who publicly apologised for previously referring to Mehdiyev as a "father figure." Oruj asked President Ilham Aliyev for forgiveness, stating that he had been unaware of Mehdiyev's alleged actions and now regarded Aliyev as the true "father" of the nation.

Former Minister of Foreign Affairs Elmar Mammadyarov also denied any association with Mehdiyev. In an interview with Musavat TV, Mammadyarov stated that after leaving the Presidential Administration, he had no contact with Mehdiyev and that they "never exchanged a single word." His comments followed media reports linking him to Mehdiyev's inner circle.

Similarly, former Prime Minister and diplomat Hasan Hasanov criticised Mehdiyev in remarks to the state news agency, describing him as "hypocritical," "intriguing," and "insincere" during his years in power.

==== Opposition ====
Opposition leader Ali Karimli of the Popular Front Party remarked that Mehdiyev's arrest showed "no one is untouchable," no matter how long they have served.

Mehman Aliyev, former director of the now-defunct Turan Information Agency, told Meydan TV that the charges could partly serve as a means to purge individuals within state institutions who had ties to Mehdiyev. "He brought many people into office...he had access to many structures," Aliyev said. He suggested that the case against Mehdiyev might also function as a pretext for an internal restructuring or an effort to dismantle his remaining network of influence within the state apparatus.

=== International ===
- Russia: Following the incident, the Kremlin refrained from issuing substantive comments. The tone in Russian media and among analysts, however, has varied. Some commentators interpret Mehtiev's arrest as a consequence of Baku's closer alignment with the West and Turkey, arguing that Azerbaijan is distancing itself from "pro-Russian cadres." Others view the development as indicative of a tacit understanding between Presidents Putin and Aliyev, suggesting that the Russian leadership may be implicitly supporting its Azerbaijani counterpart.

== See also ==
- 2025 Azerbaijan–Russia diplomatic crisis
