= Elnur M. Allahverdiyev =

Azerbaijani politician (born 1978)

Elnur Allahverdiyev Member of the National Assembly of Azerbaijan
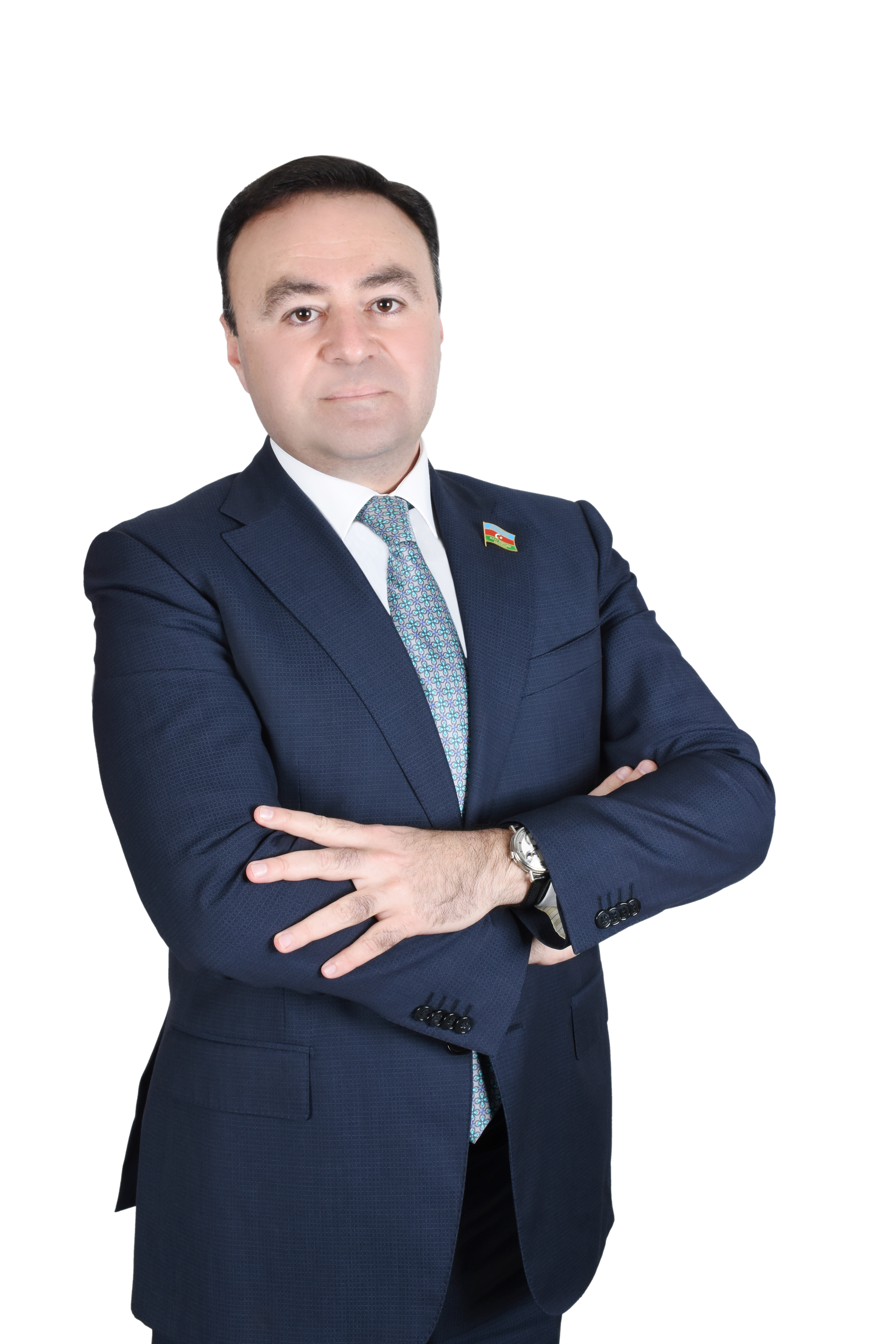

Member of the Azerbaijan Parliament for Yasamal District
- Incumbent
- Assumed office 10 March 2020
- Preceded by: new constituency

Personal details
- Born: 21 April 1978 (age 48) Baku, Azerbaijan SSR
- Party: New Azerbaijan Party
- Education: Azerbaijan International University
- Occupation: Law
- Profession: School of law
- Committees: Committee on Youth and Sport

Elnur Marat oglu Allahverdiyev (Azerbaijani: Elnur Marat oğlu Allahverdiyev; born 21 April 1978) is an Azerbaijani entrepreneur and politician who is a Member of the National Assembly of Azerbaijan (VI convocation).

== Early life and education ==
Elnur Allahverdiyev was born on April 21, 1978, in Baku. He received his bachelor education in Azerbaijan International University in 1995–99. From July 1999 to July 2000 he served in the military unit N of the Azerbaijani Armed Forces in Gazakh District. Then, he successfully completed his degree from "Legal Regulation of the Economy" faculty of Azerbaijan State University of Economics in 2015.

== Career ==
He worked as an adviser to the director of the Heydar Aliyev Center, then as the general director of ABC Telecom LLC. Allahverdiyev served as the chairman of the supervisory board of Azercell Telecom LLC. He terminated his entrepreneurial activity in connection with the Azerbaijan parliamentary election in 2020. From November 13, 2014, to December 29, 2019, he was the Honorary Consul of the Slovenia in Azerbaijan. He is a member of the New Azerbaijan Party.

Elnur Allahverdiyev is a Member of the National Assembly of Azerbaijan (VI convocation) for Yasamal #17. He is fluent in English and Russian.
