= Elizabeth Tudor (writer) =

Azerbaijani writer (born 1978)

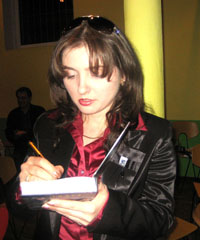
- Tudor in Stuttgart, Germany
- Born: July 26, 1978 (age 48); Baku, Azerbaijan
- Education: Azerbaijan International University, Florida International University, University of Miami School of Law
- Writing career
- Genre: Science fiction
- Notable works: Secrets of the underwater Caspian; Murderer Chupacabra; Prisoner 1333; The Saros series

Lala Elizabeth Tudor Hassenberg (Russian: Лала Элизабет Тюдор Гассенберг, romanized: Lala Elizabet Tyudor Gassenberg; born July 26, 1978), also known as Lala Hasanova (Russian: Лала Гасанова, romanized: Lala Gasanova), is an Azerbaijani-Russian science fiction writer and lawyer of Jewish ancestry.

== Biography ==
Born in Baku, Tudor graduated from the Azerbaijan International University in 1998, the Florida International University in 2013 and the University of Miami School of Law in 2015. She started to write in 1994, having selected science fiction as her chosen genre. Tudor is a member of the International Federation of Russian-speaking Writers and the Writers' Union of Azerbaijan. She is also a member of international writers' unions such as The New Contemporary and Broad Universe. In 2016, Elizabeth Tudor became a member of the Authors Guild, the America's oldest and largest professional organization for writers.

== Career ==
Tudor's first novel was published in 2001, the science fiction novel War of Times. In 2002, Elizabeth Tudor was accepted into the Union of Writers of Azerbaijan. In the same year her two new books, the science-fiction novel Elects of Heavens and the collection of fantastic and adventure stories Murderer Chupacabra were published.

In 2003, she finished the historical-fantastic novel Secret of Underwater Caspian. 2004 was marked by the publication of the science fiction novel Seven Envoys, which she devoted to the memory of English writer Walter Scott. In 2005 two other books were published – Exiles of Heavens and Masters of heavens.

In 2007, Tudor's next science-fiction novel Collision, was dedicated to the Governor of California Arnold Schwarzenegger. This was the only book from Azerbaijan included in a Russian literary festival held in Stuttgart, Germany, in 2008. In the same year as Collision, the collection of stories The Shadow of Centuries was issued.

Her series Saros of historical fantasy novels will be reportedly a 13-volume series.

== Works ==
=== Novels ===
- "Война времен" (2001) (War of times)
- "Избранники небес" (2002) (Elects of heavens)
- "Тайны подводного Каспия" (2004) (Secrets of the underwater Caspian)
- "Семь посланников" (2004) (Seven envoys)
- "Изгнанники небес" (2005) (Exiles of heavens)
- "Повелители небес" (2005) (Masters of heavens)
- "Коллизия" (2007) (Collision)
- Сарос. "Кевин Коннор" (2009) (Saros: Kevin Connor)
- Сарос. «Аарон Шмуэль» (2009) (Saros: Aaron Shmuel)
- Сарос. «Барак Келлерман» (2011) (Saros: Barak Kellerman)
- Сарос. «Борис Гроссман» (2013) (Saros: Boris Grossman)
- Сарос. «Аббас Алекперов» (2014) (Saros: Abbas Alakbarov)

=== Short novels ===
- "Черная смерть в белую зиму"
- "Ложь, предательство и месть"
- "Тень веков" (2007)

=== Stories ===
- "Убийца Чупакабра" (2002) (Murderer Chupacabra)
- "Если наступит завтра..." ("If tomorrow comes....")
- "Захватчики миров"
- "Горячий капучино" (Hot Capuccino)
- "Эльютера – остров грез" ("Eleuthera – the island of dreams")
- "Время, взятое взаймы"
- "Человек-шок"
- "Интеллигент-убийца"
- "Убийца времени" ("The Time Killer")
- "Сон во сне"
- "Воришка Бен"
- "Заключенный 1333" (2008) (Prisoner 1333)
