= 2025 Azerbaijan–Russia diplomatic crisis =

2025 Azerbaijan-Russia diplomatic crisis
- Part of Azerbaijan–Russia relations, the Armenia–Azerbaijan conflict, and the Russo-Ukrainian War
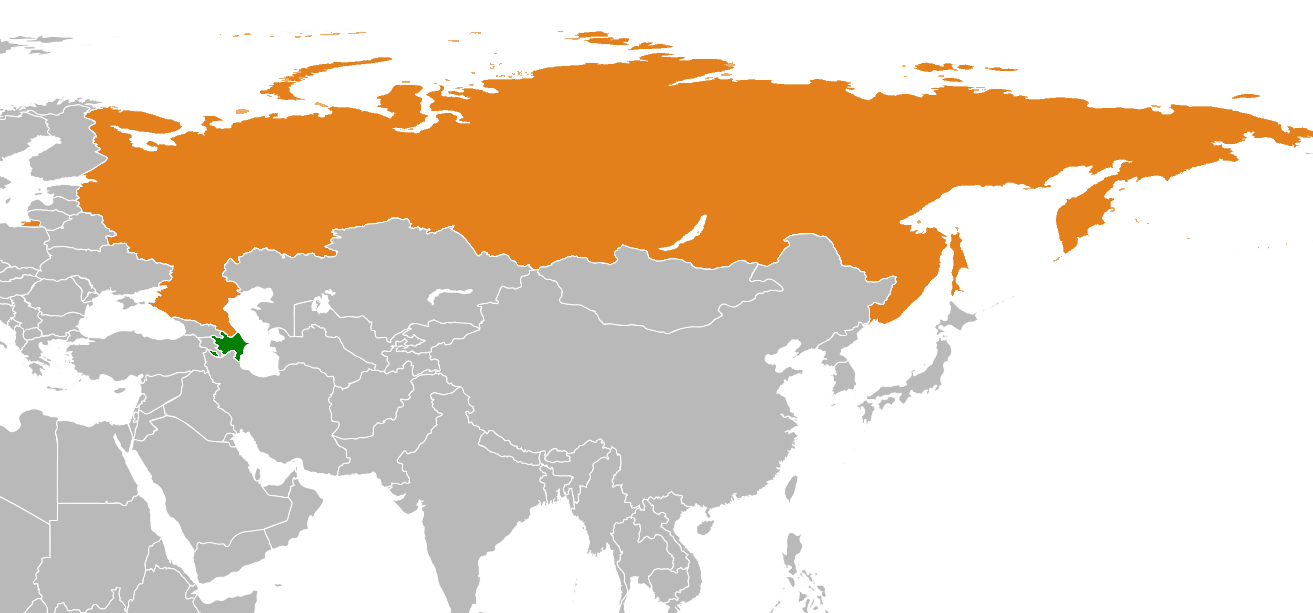
- Map of Russia (orange) and Azerbaijan (green)
- Date: 27 June – 9 October 2025 (3 months, 1 week and 5 days)
- Location: Azerbaijan, Russia
- Result: Ties restored

Parties
Azerbaijan	Russia

Lead figures
Ilham Aliyev	Vladimir Putin

A diplomatic crisis broke out between Azerbaijan and Russia in June 2025, when Russia arrested several ethnic Azeris as part of what it claimed to be an investigation into a 2001 murder. Azerbaijan responded by shutting down a Russian state television office and arresting Russian nationals working there.

The crisis was resolved in October following a meeting between Azerbaijani president Ilham Aliyev and Russian president Vladimir Putin.

== Background ==
=== Russian relations with Armenia and Azerbaijan ===
Russia has traditionally had an alliance with Armenia, which is a member of the Collective Security Treaty Organization (CSTO). It had brokered a truce between Armenia and Azerbaijan that ended the Second Nagorno-Karabakh War. Relations, however, deteriorated following the 2023 Azerbaijani offensive in Nagorno-Karabakh, which led to the expulsion of more than 100,000 ethnic Armenians in Nagorno-Karabakh. Russia, by then pre-occupied with its invasion of Ukraine, did not provide support for Armenia, which subsequently looked towards Europe for allies. In the following months, Russia began to align more closely with Azerbaijan, endorsing the Zangezur corridor – an idea proposed by Azerbaijan that would unite it with its Nakhchivan exclave – drawing the ire of Armenia and Iran.

In December 2024, an Azerbaijan Airlines Embraer 190 jet, Azerbaijan Airlines Flight 8243, crashed near Aktau, Kazakhstan, killing 38 of the 67 passengers on board. The plane had been struck by a Russian air-defense system due to increased anti-air vigilance amid Ukrainian drone strikes in southern Russia. Azerbaijani president Ilham Aliyev demanded a formal apology and compensation from Russia, and claimed that Russia had hoped the plane would crash in the Caspian Sea so evidence would be lost. The incident led to a severe deterioration in relations between the two countries.

Aliyev did not attend the 2025 Moscow Victory Day Parade, instead visiting sites commemorating the Second Nagorno-Karabakh War. His snub demonstrated the degree to which relations between the two countries had disintegrated.

=== Criminal investigations into Azeris ===
In 2001, a man was stabbed to death near a restaurant in Yekaterinburg. Local media at the time reported that the man had whispered the names of his killers to the police before dying. Both the alleged perpetrators and the victim were ethnic Azeris.

On 26 June 2025, Russia opened a criminal case against Aras Agalarov, a Russian-Azeri oligarch and acquaintance of Aliyev.

== Crisis ==
=== Russian arrest of ethnic Azeris ===
On 27 June 2025, Russian police arrested multiple ethnic Azeris as part of a criminal investigation into the 2001 murder, which it alleged involved organized crime. Two of the men arrested died in custody, and their bodies were returned to Azerbaijan, whereupon it was determined that they had died due to "post-traumatic shock caused by multiple injuries", which Azerbaijan blamed on Russian police brutality.

=== Azerbaijani arrest of Russian nationals ===
In retaliation, Azerbaijani police stormed a Russian state television office in Baku and arrested seven of its employees. Several other Russians, who were accused of drug trafficking, were arrested. The detainees, who are not known to have any prior criminal records, were beaten and bruised under custody, sparking outrage in Russia and calls for a tough response, although Russia has hitherto shown restraint. Many of the Russians arrested are refugees who fled to Azerbaijan to avoid serving in Ukraine following the announcement of partial mobilization in 2022.

=== Subsequent events ===
On 20 July, Azerbaijan announced it would file an international lawsuit against Russia over its involvement in the Aktau plane crash. On 3 September, Putin and Aliyev briefly met and shook hands in Beijing, where they had both been separately invited to by China to attend a military parade commemorating the 80th anniversary of Japan's defeat in World War II. On 9 October, Putin and Aliyev had their first formal meeting in a year in Dushanbe, during which Putin admitted that the Flight 8243 had been hit by a Russian surface-to-air missile and apologized. Putin also offered to pay compensation to Azerbaijan, which Aliyev expressed gratitude.

== Reactions ==
=== Russia ===
Russia has attempted to play down the crisis, with Maria Zakharova, the foreign ministry spokeswoman, saying that "friendly relations are very important" to Russia and Azerbaijan. Dmitry Peskov, the Kremlin press secretary, accused Azerbaijan of acting emotionally, and that third parties like Ukraine "would do everything to add fuel to the fire". The images of detainees being badly beaten by Azerbaijani police has led to intense controversy in Russia, with Azerbaijan being accused of treating Russians as hostages, and some have encouraged the government to retaliate.

=== Ukraine ===
Ukraine has accused Russia of beefing up military bases in Armenia in an effort to "destabilize" the Caucasus region. This has been denied by Armenia.

== See also ==
- 2017 Dutch–Turkish diplomatic crisis
- 2025 Azerbaijani coup plot
