= Presidential standard of Azerbaijan =

- Proportion: 1:1
- Adopted: September 15, 2008; 18 years ago

The presidential standard (or flag) of the Republic of Azerbaijan (Azerbaijani: Azərbaycan Respublikası Prezidentinin ştandartı (bayrağı)) is the official flag of the president of Azerbaijan.

== History ==
The flag of the president of Azerbaijan was confirmed by Decree No. 828 of the president of Azerbaijan on “The Standard (flag) of the President of the Republic of Azerbaijan” dated September 15, 2008. The decree came into force on the same day of its issuance.

== Usage ==
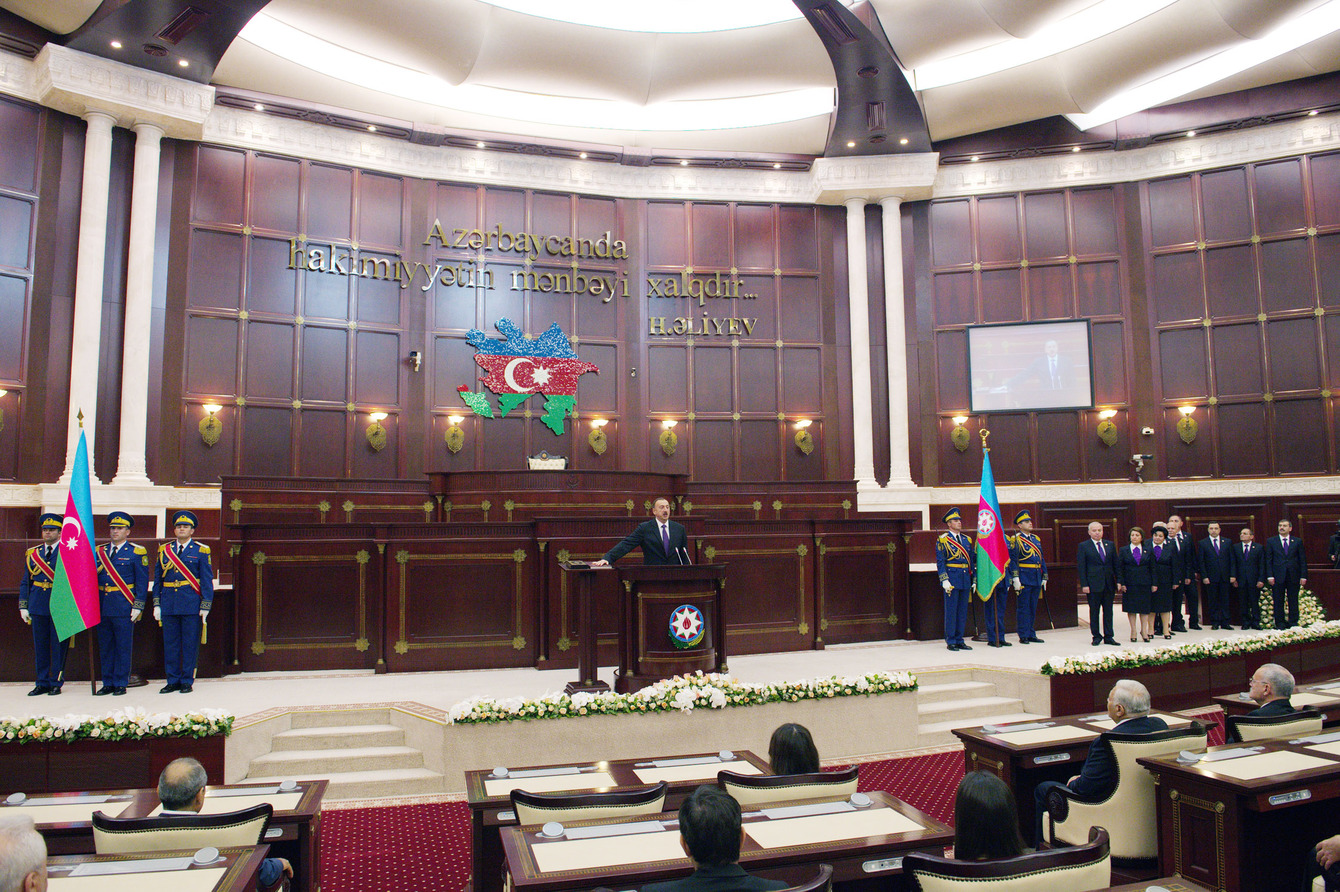
Inauguration ceremony of President Ilham Aliyev in 2013, with the flag of Azerbaijan (left) and presidential flag (right) present

According to the decree, the standard of the president of Azerbaijan is the official symbol of the president of Azerbaijan. The original version of the presidential standard is kept in the office of the president at the Presidential Palace. The duplicates of the presidential flag can be placed, hung or raised on the buildings of the Presidential Palace and presidential residences; it also can be placed in the halls or rooms of the Presidential Palace or presidential residences if any official event is intended to be conducted in the presence of the president; on other premises when the president of Azerbaijan is visiting; in the halls or on the building, where official or other types of events are being held with the participation of the president of Azerbaijan; and on the vehicles of the president.

The presidential flag is also used during inaugural ceremony. It is brought onto the stage by the soldiers of the Armed Forces under the accompaniment of a ceremonial march during inauguration ceremony.

== Design ==
The presidential flag is like a square version of the tricolor Azerbaijani flag with the national emblem of Azerbaijan on both sides of the red stripe instead of a white crescent and eight-pointed star. The presidential flag is framed with golden fringes.

There is silver cord attached to the pole of the presidential flag illustrating the full name of the president of Azerbaijan and the date of his term of office. The pole of the flag is covered with a metal hood in crescent and eight-point star shape.

== See also ==
- President of Azerbaijan
- Flag of Azerbaijan
