= Zagulba Presidential Residence =

Official suburban residence of the President of Azerbaijan

Presidential Residence
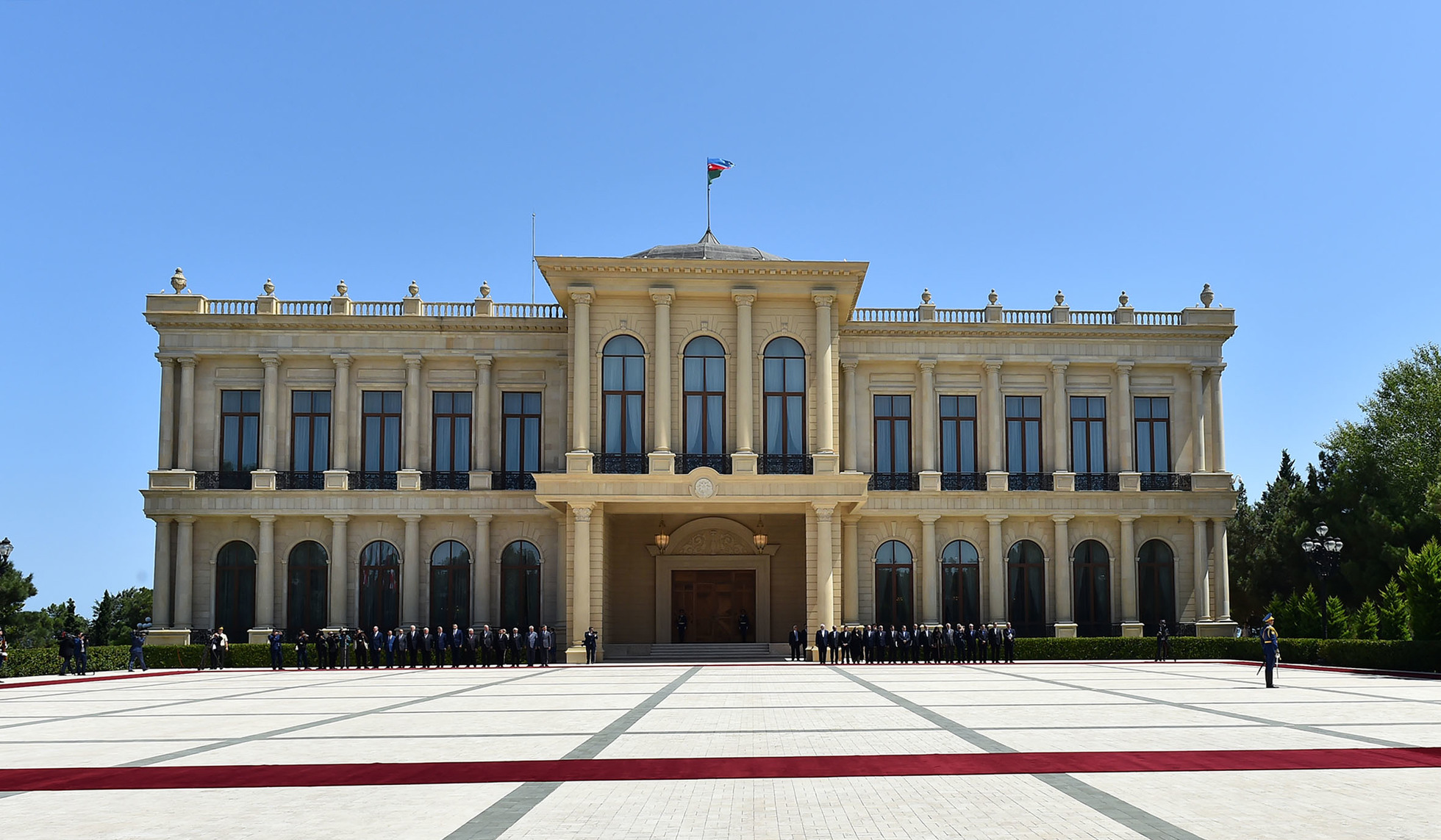
- The palace in August 2016
- Interactive map of the Presidential Residence area

General information
- Status: Active
- Location: Baku, Azerbaijan
- Coordinates: 40°32′32″N 50°05′26″E
- Current tenants: Ilham Aliyev
- Completed: 2008
- Owner: President of Azerbaijan

Zuğulba Presidential Palace (Azerbaijani: "Zuğulba" iqamətgahı) is the official suburban residence of the president of Azerbaijan. It is located in the village of Zağulba, 40 km from Baku near the Caspian Sea.

== History ==
In Soviet times, the site was home to government dachas for leaders of the Azerbaijan Communist Party and the Azerbaijan Soviet Socialist Republic. In 1979, then leader of Soviet Azerbaijan Heydar Aliyev, allowed up-and-coming chess genius Garry Kasparov use of the premises as a place to ensure suitable peace and concentration for his development, a privilege that his great chess opponent Anatoly Karpov considered a significant advantage.

The current palace building was constructed in 2008.

== Description ==
The residence is located on the shores of the Caspian Sea and is intended for use during official meetings and events and as a permanent residence of the presidential family. Its architecture combines elements of Western architecture with the Azerbaijani national style. Many foreign dignitaries have been received in the palace, such as Israeli Prime Minister Benjamin Netanyahu, Belarusian President Alexander Lukashenko, Russian Presidents Dmitry Medvedev and Vladimir Putin, Georgian President Giorgi Margvelashvili.

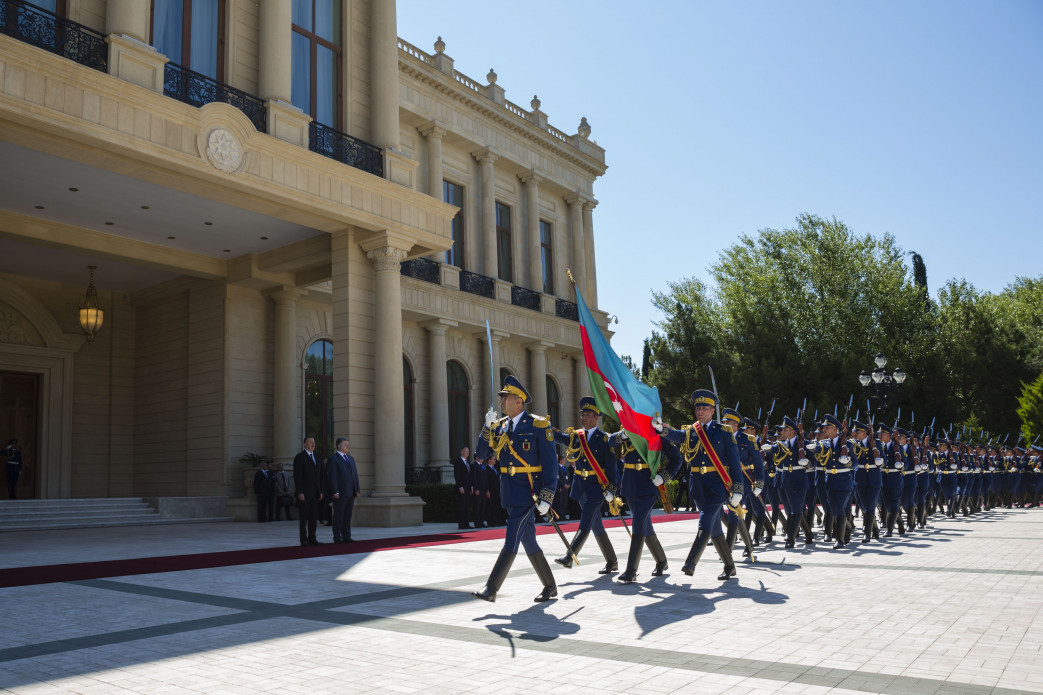
The Azerbaijani National Guard at the palace

== See also ==
- Ala Archa State Residence
- President's Residence, Yerevan
- Ceremonial Palace of Georgia
