= Haji Mammadov =

Azerbaijani musician (1920–1981)

Haji Mammadov Hacı Məmmədov
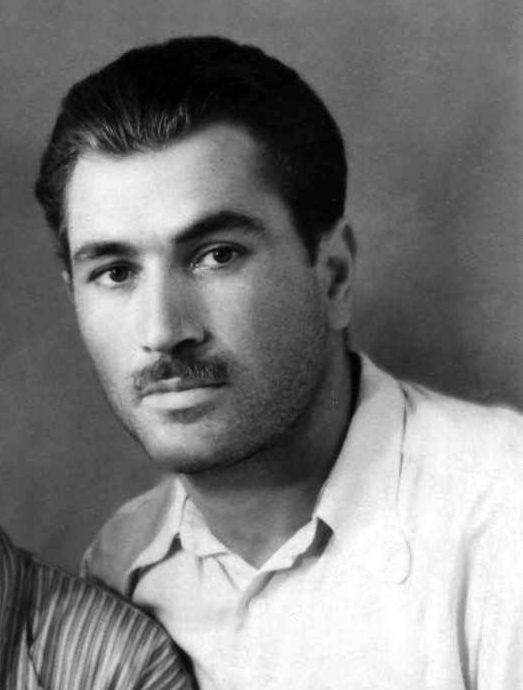

Background information
- Born: 28 April 1920; Shamakhi, Shamakhi Uyezd, Azerbaijan SSR
- Died: 2 August 1981 (aged 61) Baku, Azerbaijan SSR, USSR
- Occupation: Tar player
- Education: Azerbaijan State Medical Institute
- Awards: People's Artist of the Azerbaijan SSR Honored Artist of the Azerbaijan SSR

Haji Mammad oghlu Mammadov (Azerbaijani: Hacı Məmməd oğlu Məmmədov, April 28, 1920 — August 2, 1981) was an Azerbaijani tar player and People's Artist of the Azerbaijani SSR.

== Biography ==
Haji Mammadov was born on April 28, 1920, in Shamakhi. He studied at Azerbaijan State Medical Institute in 1943–1948. In 1949–1970 he worked as a doctor-surgeon. In 1930–1948 he worked in Azerbaijan State Orchestra of Folk Instruments, from 1949 he was a soloist of Azerbaijan State Philharmonic Hall.

Haji Mammadov was one of the first performers of works of classical Russian and Western European composers on tar. He accompanied singers such as Bulbul, Seyid Shushinski, Zulfu Adigozalov, and toured in many foreign countries including Belgium, Poland, Hungary, Iran, Syria and Algeria.

Mammadov died on August 2, 1981, in Baku.

== Awards ==
- People's Artist of the Azerbaijan SSR - May 18, 1963
- Honored Artist of the Azerbaijan SSR
- Order of the Badge of Honour - June 9, 1959

== Literature ==
- Guliev, Jamil, ed. (1982). "Куба – Мисир". Азәрбајҹан Совет Енсиклопедијасы. Vol. VI. Baku: Азәрбајҹан Совет Енсиклопедијасынын Баш Редаксиjасы.
- Həsənova, Şəhla (2017). Hacı Məmmədov (in Azerbaijani). Baku: Şərq-Qərb. p. 104. ISBN 978-9952-517-72-9.
