= Futbol+ =

Azerbaijani sport newspaper

- Type: Daily sports newspaper
- Format: Broadsheet
- Founder: Vugar Mammadov
- Editor-in-chief: Mahir Rustamov
- Founded: 21 October 1997; 28 years ago
- Language: Azerbaijani
- Headquarters: Baku, Azerbaijan
- Sister newspapers: Bukmeker
- Website: www.football-plus.az

Futbol+ is an Azerbaijani national daily sport newspaper owned by Vugar Mammadov. The newspaper focuses primarily on football, in particular the day-to-day activities of Azerbaijan Premier League clubs. It has one of the highest in Azerbaijan for a daily newspaper, and quarter than half of sports readership.

== History ==
Futbol+ was founded on 21 October 1997 by Vugar Mammadov. In 2012, the club celebrated its 15th year since its launch. In the 2010s, the newspaper saw falling profits, but did not change its policies or the nature of the content it carried.
