= Sabir Central City Library =

Central City Library named after M.A. Sabir
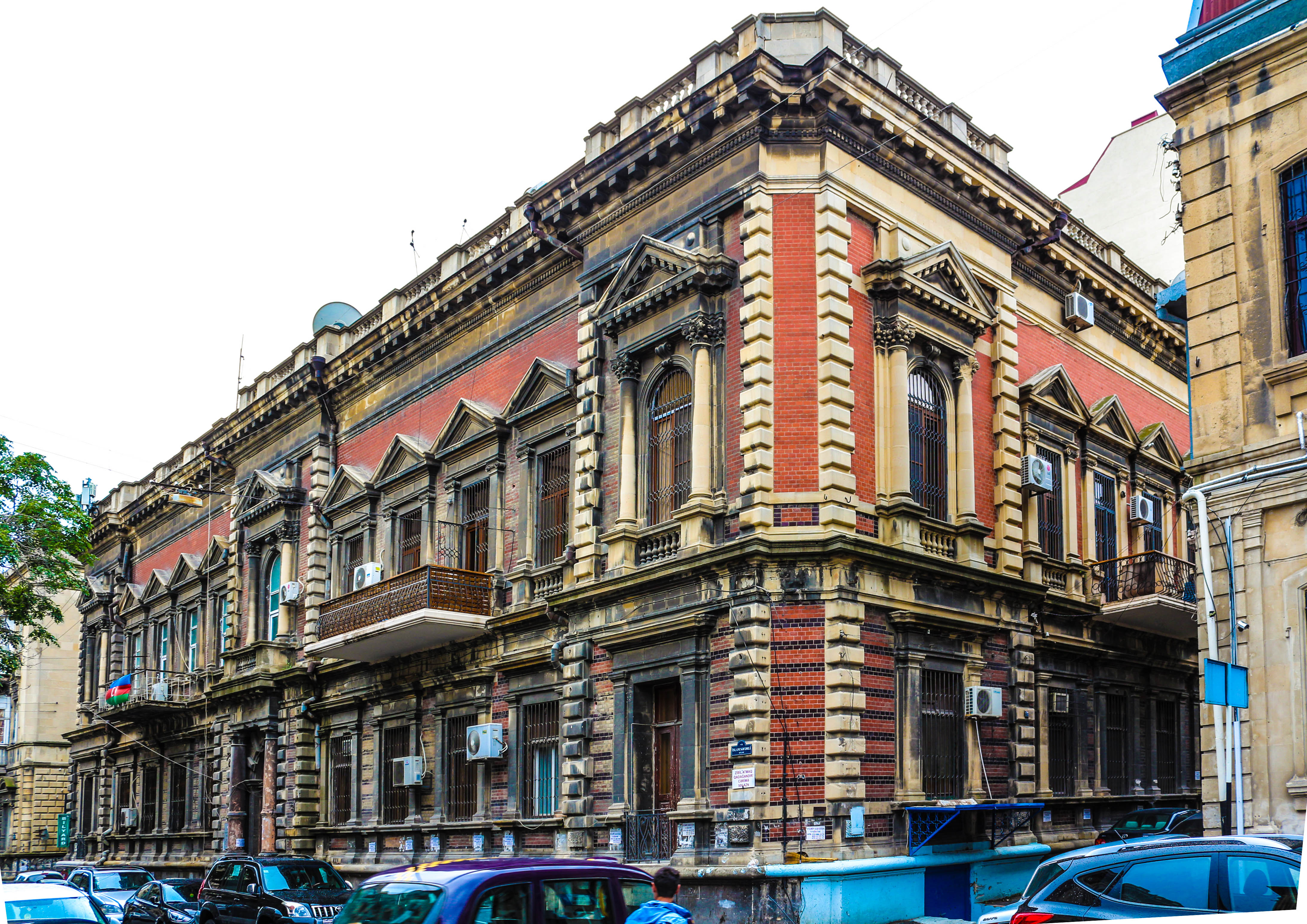
- Eastern façade of the building
- Interactive map of the Central City Library named after M.A. Sabir area
- Former names: Melikov brothers' house, Hussein, Melik-Hussein, Mutalib

General information
- Type: Mansion
- Architectural style: Baroque Revival architecture
- Location: 13 Islam Safarli St., Baku, Azerbaijan
- Construction started: 1919

The Mirza Alakbar Sabir Central City Library (Azerbaijani: Mirzə Ələkbər Sabir adına Mərkəzi Şəhər Kitabxanası) is a public library in downtown Baku, Azerbaijan, established in 1919.

== History ==
In late 1918, the Cultural-Educational Department of the Association of Consumer Societies of Azerbaijan decided to open a public library. Providing the collection for the new library proved to be a difficult task, since there was no large-scale publication in the country at the time. The library's initial collection included a few hundred items, mostly acquired from personal book collections and its readership was very limited. In 1921, it was named after Mirza Alekper Sabir in commemoration of the tenth anniversary of his death. At this time, with the exception of limited resources in Azeri, most published materials were in Persian, Arabic and Turkish.

The library was founded at 13 Verkhnyaya Priyutskaya Street (present-day Shamil Azizbeyov Street). Later it was moved to its present location in the 1904 baroque mansion which once belonged Melikov brothers Hussein, Melik-Hussein and Mutalib, and was designed by architect Vartan Sarkisov.

By 1929, the library contained 12,300 items and had 4,000 readers, included an association of women readers establish to promote library services among newly emancipated Azerbaijani women. In 1938, the library became the first establishment in Azerbaijan to train professional librarians. In 1941, it became the first library in the country to have a bibliographic reference department.

In 2014, the Sabir Central City Library was named "Best Library of the Year".

It was re-opened in 2017 by the government of Baku.
