= Elshad Abdullayev =

Azerbaijani lawyer

Elshad Islam oglu Abdullayev (Azerbaijani: Elşad Abdullayev) is an Azerbaijani lawyer and former university rector who gained wide popularity in 2012 after producing and publishing hidden camera videos, raising public and international awareness of corruption in the Azerbaijani government. The controversy that arose as a result came to be known as the Gulargate scandal, after former MP Gular Ahmadova of the ruling New Azerbaijan Party, who featured in the first video. He lives in exile in France.

== Early career ==
Abdullayev was born in the town of Kurdamir in central Azerbaijan where he received secondary education. In 1979, he graduated with an honors degree in law from the Baku State University. He received a master's and later a doctorate degree in law in Moscow in 1985 and 2000 respectively. He was the dean of the constitution law department of Baku State University since 1995 and a professor since 2004. He is married and has three children.

== 2005 parliamentary election campaign and voter bribery ==
Abdullayev joined the New Azerbaijan Party and unsuccessfully ran as a candidate in the parliamentary election of 2005. Notably, his constituency of Binagadi II was among the five in which the voting results (according to which Abdullayev won) became void and new voting was scheduled for 2006. However, a polling station official reported violations during the campaign, namely that Elshad Abdullayev had reportedly been bribing the electorate to gain votes. A criminal case ensued and the court was presented evidence, following which Abdullayev's candidacy was annulled.

In 2012, Abdullayev claimed that he believed he had in fact won the election, but that "certain powers" did not wish to see him in the parliament, as that would enable Abdullayev to expose the actions of a "criminal gang of kidnappers" who, he alleged, were responsible for the kidnapping of his older brother, Ministry of State Security officer Mahir Abdullayev, back in 2003 and poisoning of his younger brother Eldaniz Abdullayev who undertook a personal investigation of the kidnapping.

== Controversies around the Azerbaijan International University ==
In 1997, Abdullayev founded the Azerbaijan International University, a registered private institution for post-secondary education in Baku, Azerbaijan. In 2006, the Attorney General's Office announced it had received reports of corruption taking place in the institution, including proof of bribe-based student admission while passing over the official state admission examination. As a result of a four-year-long investigation, the university was stripped of its license on the orders of Minister of Education Misir Mardanov on 30 August 2010. Elshad Abdullayev disagreed with the Ministry's decision, claiming that his had received a four-year license in 2007 and that it could not have been simply revoked, but only expired.

In 2010, former employees of the university were charged with illegal organ transplanting at the medical centre affiliated with the Azerbaijan International University. Abdullayev sought political asylum in France soon afterwards.

== Gulargate scandal ==
In September 2012, Abdullayev accused government officials of Azerbaijan of having forced him to pay a 2,000,000-dollar bribe back in 2005 in return for finding his brother and obtaining a seat in the National Assembly. Neither even happened, according to Abdullayev, and the money was not returned to him. Abdullayev specifically accused the head of the Presidential Administration of Azerbaijan Ramiz Mehdiyev and claimed that Member of Parliament Gular Ahmadova helped broker the deal. After Ahmadova's denial, Abdullayev published a video on YouTube where he is seen discussing the bribe sum to be paid to Gular Ahmadova to be taken to higher authorities in return for a seat in the National Assembly and finding his kidnapped brother. Abdullayev warned of being in possession of more videos, where names of President Ilham Aliyev and Minister of Emergency Situations Kamaladdin Heydarov are also mentioned. He also expressed concerns that instead of trying Ahmadova for extortion, Attorney General Zakir Garalov chose to persecute Abdullayev's family members in Azerbaijan in retaliation. He added that none of this would have been published, had the authorities established a neutral investigation commission. Abdullayev released other videos in the course of the next few months, widening the controversy. He admitted that with these videos, he specifically targeted Ramiz Mehdiyev who had allegedly established "death squadrons" in 1994 that have been behind a number of controversial assassinations.

== Court actions ==
In June 2025, a court in Baku issued arrest warrants for Abdullayev and several other activists and journalists who have publicly criticized Azerbaijani authorities and live in other countries. The international organization Human Rights Watch described the arrest warrants as part of a pattern of suppressing dissent by bringing spurious criminal charges. Abdullayev was charged with bribery, tax evasion, and illegal organ trafficking. In December 2025, the Baku Grave Crimes Court sentenced Abdullayev, who was not present, to 15 years in prison.

== See also ==
- Human rights in Azerbaijan
- Media freedom in Azerbaijan
