= President of Azerbaijan =

Head of state

President of the Republic of Azerbaijan
- Azərbaycan Prezidenti
- Standard of the president

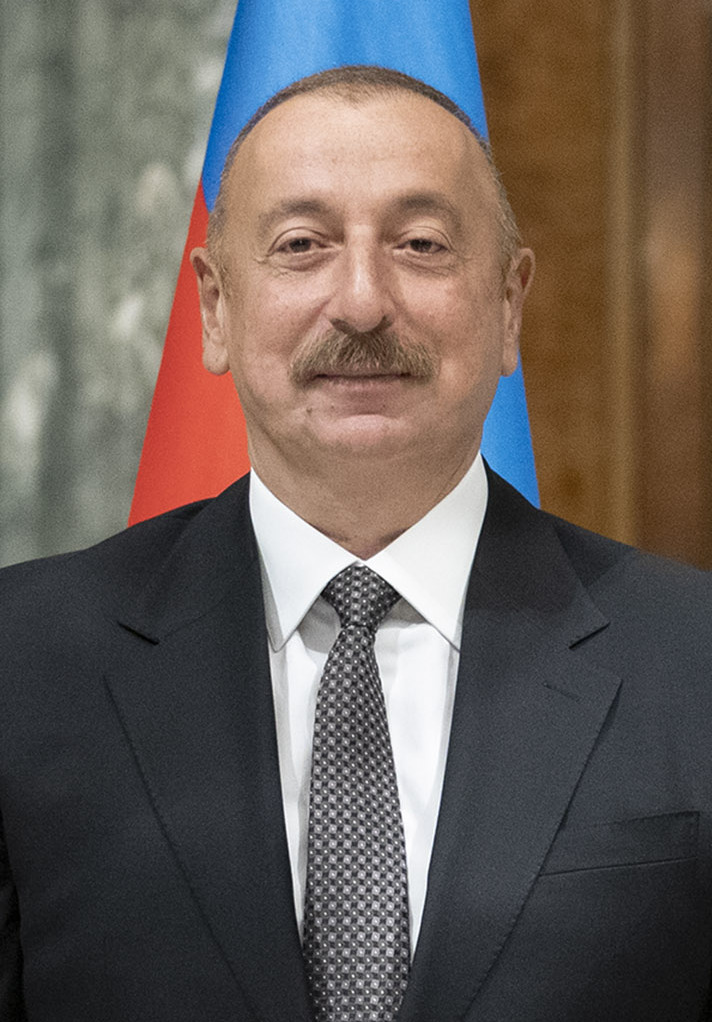
- Incumbent; Ilham Aliyev since 31 October 2003
- Presidential Administration of Azerbaijan; Executive branch of the Government of Azerbaijan
- Type: Head of state
- Residence: Zuğulba Residence in Baku (primary)
- Term length: Seven years, renewable
- Constituting instrument: Constitution of Azerbaijan (1995)
- Formation: 18 May 1990; 36 years ago
- First holder: Ayaz Mutallibov
- Deputy: Speaker of the National Assembly of Azerbaijan (1991–2002); Prime Minister of Azerbaijan (2002–2017); Vice President of Azerbaijan (2017–present)
- Salary: ₼180,000 annually
- Website: The President of Azerbaijan

The president of the Republic of Azerbaijan (Azerbaijani: Azərbaycan Respublikasının Prezidenti) is the head of state of the Republic of Azerbaijan. The Constitution states that the president is the embodiment of executive power, commander-in-chief, "representative of Azerbaijan in home and foreign policies", and "shall have the right of immunity [from prosecution]." The president rules through his executive office, the Presidential Administration, consisting of a group of secretaries and departmental ministers. Additionally, there is a Cabinet of Ministers regarding economic and social policy and a Security Council regarding foreign, military, and judicial matters.

The primary workplace is the presidential building (also known as the presidential apparatus) on Istiglaliyyat Street in Baku. Ilham Aliyev, son of the former president, Heydar, was elected the 4th and current president on 31 October 2003 after his father's resignation due to his deteriorating health.

== Selection process and term ==
=== Eligibility ===
Candidates for the position must be Azerbaijani citizens without age restrictions and have lived in Azerbaijan for at least 10 years. According to the Constitution of Azerbaijan, the same person can be on the post of President an unlimited number of terms.

=== Election ===
Each faction in the National Assembly has the right to nominate a candidate for the presidential elections. The minimum number of signatures for a presidential candidate fielded by a political party with no parliamentary representation is 40,000, before amendments to the law.

=== Term of office ===
Prior to 2009, the term of office was five years, with a maximum of two terms. A referendum in 2009 removed the limit on the number of terms, and in 2016, another referendum increased the term to seven years. According to the Azerbaijani administration, a longer term would provide for more continuity in decision-making. The Venice Commission, of which Azerbaijan is a member, warned that this and other provisions of the referendum gave "unprecedented" authority to the president, and could severely upset the balance of power.

=== Inauguration ===
The official inauguration ceremony of the president is not publicly held, occurring with the participation of officials of the Azerbaijan state (representatives of political parties, public organizations, military personnel, religious figures), members of the government, deputies of the National Assembly, members of the president's family, as well as foreign representatives and other invited guests.

It is held within three days after the confirmation of the elected president by the Constitutional Court, during which the president takes the following oath:

"I swear, while exercising the powers of the President of the Republic of Azerbaijan, to observe the Constitution of the Republic of Azerbaijan, to protect the independence and territorial integrity of the state, and to serve the people with dignity."

Then the person elected president of Azerbaijan puts his right hand on the Koran and takes the following oath:

"I will remain faithful to the national moral values and traditions created by the Azerbaijani people for centuries, and I will always hold them high."

Then the president-elect of Azerbaijan bows and kisses the Azerbaijani flag. The ceremony ends with a speech by the president-elect of Azerbaijan. The following is a list of presidential inaugurations:

| Place | Date |
|---|---|
| National Assembly Building | 17 June 1992 |
| Heydar Aliyev Palace | 10 October 1993 |
| Heydar Aliyev Palace | 18 October 1998 |
| Heydar Aliyev Palace | 31 October 2003 |
| Heydar Aliyev Palace | 24 October 2008 |
| National Assembly Building | 19 October 2013 |

== Powers and duties ==
=== Guarantor of the Constitution ===
As the guarantor of the Constitution and the entire system of constitutional law, the president ensures that the constitutions, laws and regulations of the constituent territories of the Azerbaijan be in full compliance with the country's Constitution and federal laws.

=== Foreign policy ===
The president is invested with extensive rights to implement the state's foreign policy. The president determines Azerbaijan's position in international affairs and represents the state in international relations, conducts negotiations and signs ratification documents.

=== Military policy ===
The president serves as the supreme commander-in-chief of the Azerbaijani Armed Forces. In this capacity, he has the power to declare a martial law.

== Agencies under the president ==
=== Presidential Administration ===
The Office of the President of Azerbaijan is the executive administration of the president, and is in charge of fulfilling the constitutional responsibilities of the president. The headquarters of office is located on Istiglaliyyat Street in Baku. It is currently headed by Samir Nuriyev.

=== Security Council ===
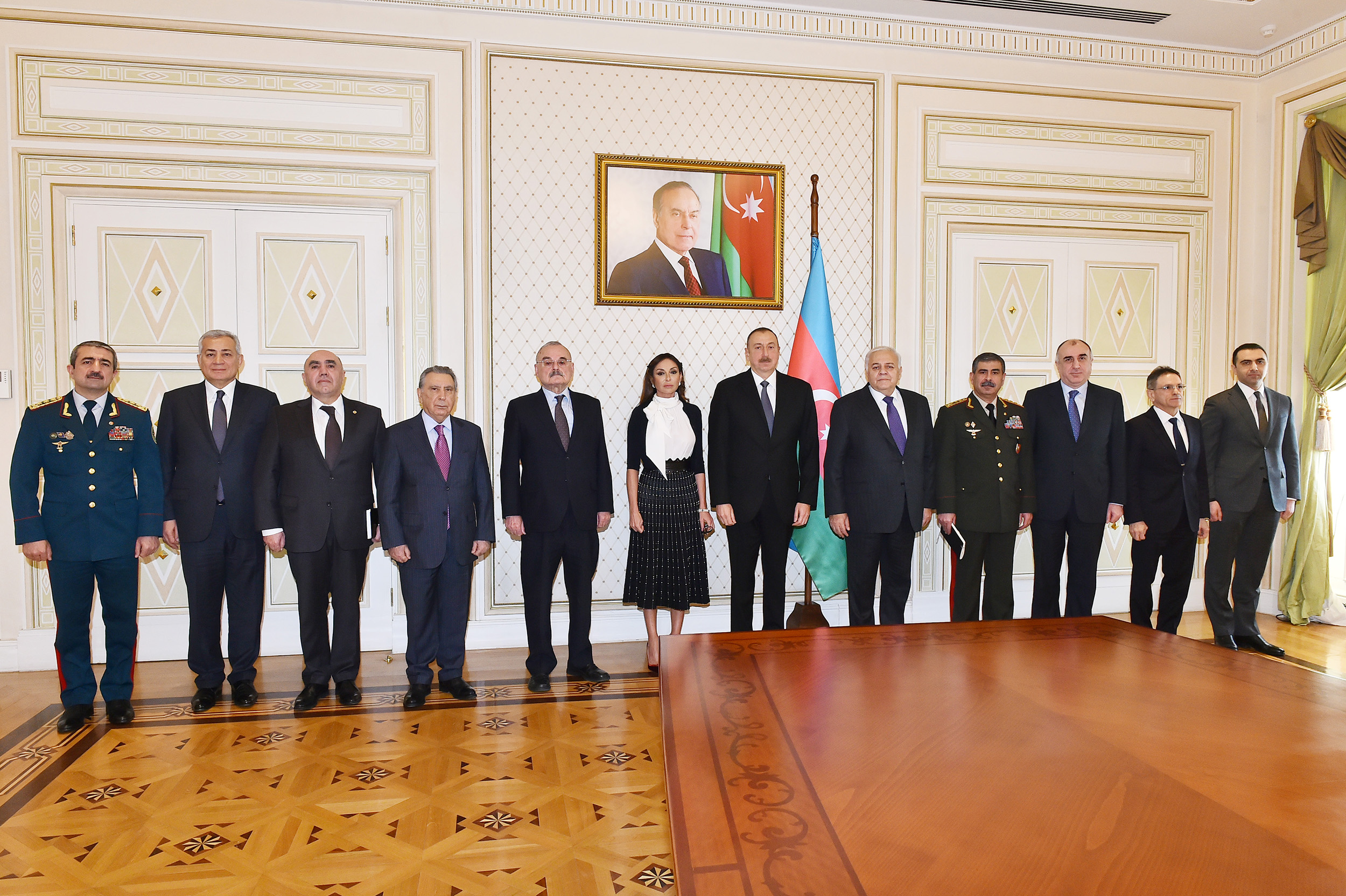
A meeting of the security council.

The Security Council (Təhlükəsizlik Şurası) is an advisory body to the president, established on 10 April 1997. The Security Council ensures the creation of conditions for the President to exercise his constitutional powers in the field of security. The chairman of the Security Council under the president of Azerbaijan is the president of Azerbaijan. The following people are members of the council:

| Position | Holder |
|---|---|
| President/Chairman | Ilham Aliyev |
| Vice President of Azerbaijan | Mehriban Aliyeva |
| Secretary of Security Council | Ramil Usubov |
| Prime Minister of Azerbaijan | Ali Asadov |
| Chairman of the National Assembly of Azerbaijan | Sahiba Gafarova |
| Head of the Presidential Administration | Samir Nuriyev |
| Assistant to the President for Law Enforcement and Military Affairs | Fuad Alasgarov |
| Prosecutor General of Azerbaijan | Kamran Aliyev |
| Minister of Internal Affairs | Vilayat Eyvazov |
| Minister of Defense | Zakir Hasanov |
| Minister of Foreign Affairs | Jeyhun Bayramov |
| Head of the State Border Service | Elchin Guliyev |
| Head of the State Security Service | Ali Nağıyev |
| Head of the Foreign Intelligence Service | Orkhan Sultanov |

Chief military advisors to the president of Azerbaijan have included Nuraddin Sadigov (1993–1999), Tofig Aghahuseynov (1997–2002) and National Security Vahid Aliyev (since April 2002).

== Symbols ==
Fanfare of the president of Azerbaijan

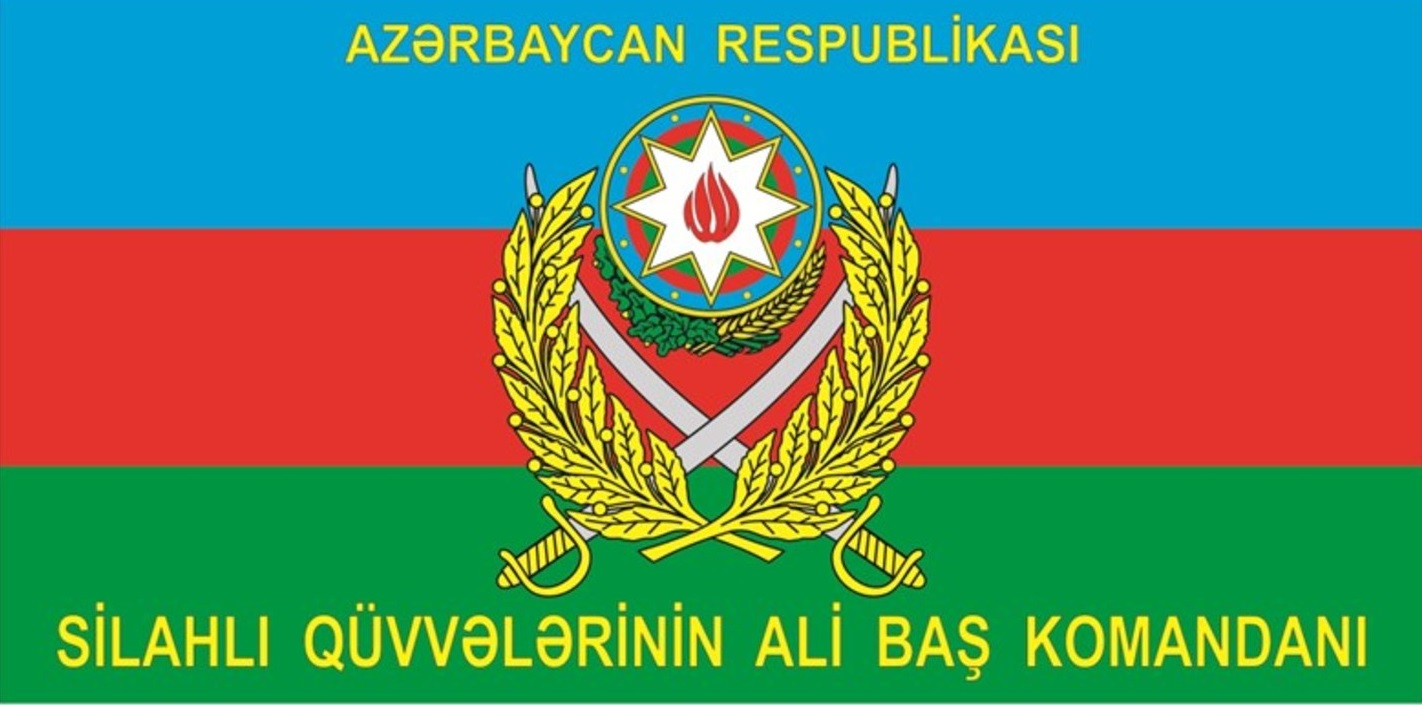
Flag of the supreme commander-in-chief

Standard of the president

Flag of the president of Azerbaijan on board a State Border Service ship

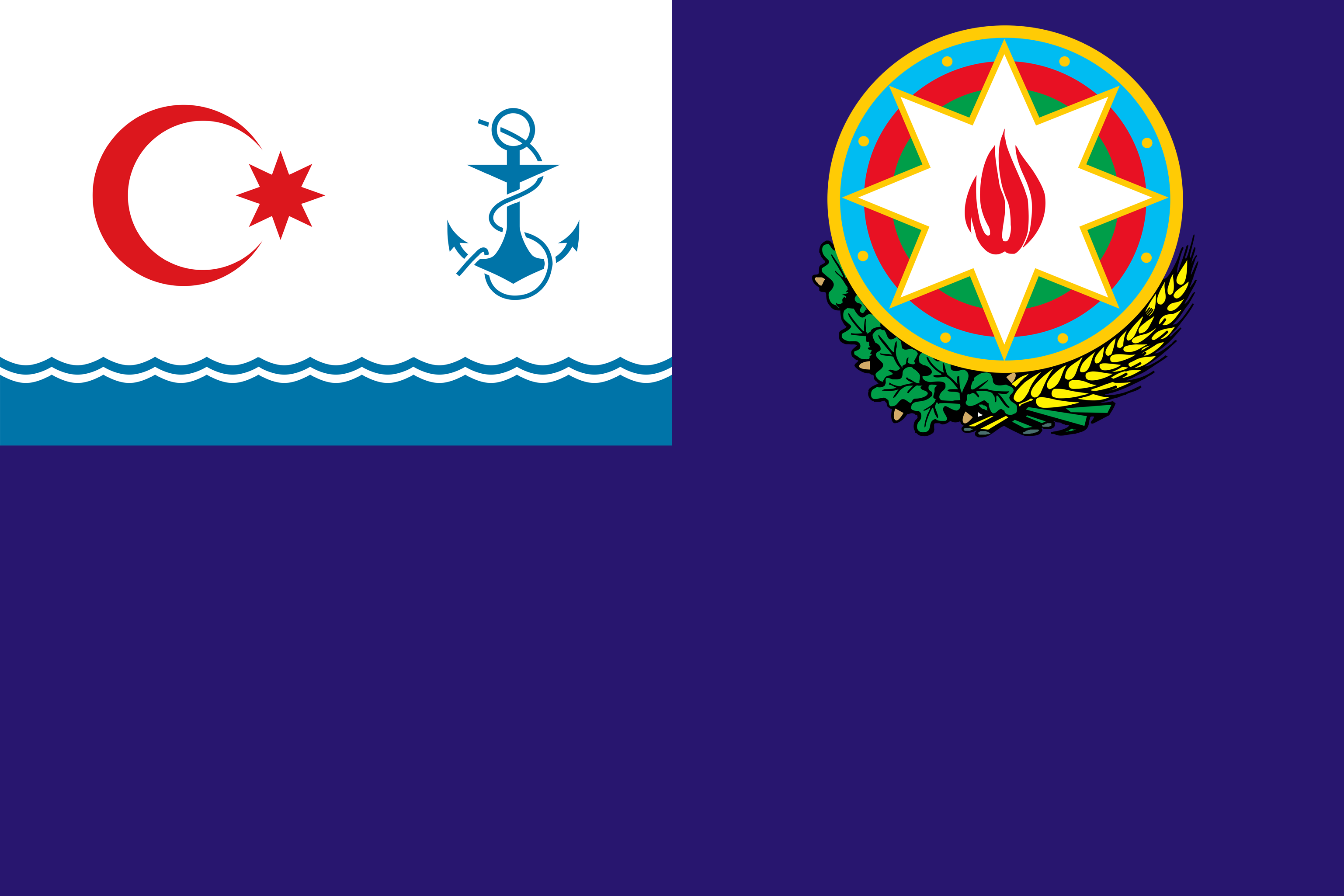
Flag of the president of Azerbaijan on board a Ministry of Emergency Situations ship

=== Standard ===
After the oath of office has been taken by the elected president, the standard is handed over to the president. These devices are used to display the rank of his office and are used on special occasions. The standard is a square version of the Azerbaijani flag, charged in the center with the Azerbaijani coat of arms. Golden fringe is added to the standard. Copies of the standard are used inside his office, other state agencies, and while the president is traveling in a vehicle inside Azerbaijan. A 2:3 ratio version of the flag is used when the President is at sea. This is the most used symbol to denote the presence of the Azerbaijan president.

=== Military flag ===
The flag of the supreme commander-in-chief of the Azerbaijani Armed Forces was approved by the decree of President Ilham Aliyev on 11 April 2019. The flag of the supreme commander-in-chief is the official military symbol of the president of Azerbaijan, with the original being kept in the service room of the president located in the Presidential Palace. It resembles the army flag but with the words "Supreme Commander-in-Chief of the Armed Forces of Azerbaijan".

=== Badge ===
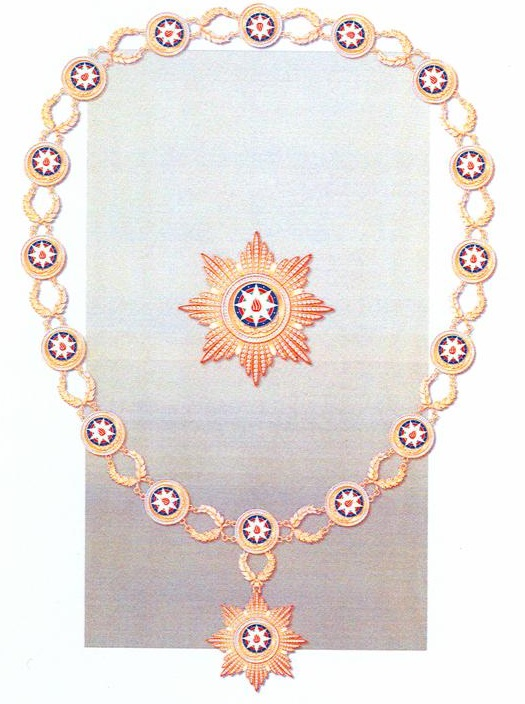
Badge of the President.

The badge of the president (Prezidentinin döş nişanı) was approved by decree on September 15, 2008. It is in the shape of an octagonal star made of 18 carat gold, placed in a circle with a diameter. In the center is a mined image of the State Emblem of Azerbaijan, which is surrounded by two rings and 60 diamonds are lined up between the rings.

== Residences ==
The main (since 2008) presidential residence is Zagulba (Azerbaijani: Zaqulba). Also, the president has several part-time residences outside of Baku:

- Youth Presidential Palace
- Presidential Mountain Palace in Qabala
- "Freedom" Guest House
- Palace of Happiness
- Gulustan Palace
- Presidential Library
- "Marxal" Treatment and Recreation Complex

As well as several vacation residences:

- Novkhani (Azerbaijani: Novxanı), Novkhani, Absheron Rayon
- Khoshbulaq (Azerbaijani: Xoşbulaq), Daşkəsən, Dashkasan District
- Göy Saray in Baku
- Vahdat Presidential Summer Palace in Shamakhi
- "Ulduz" Guest House
- "Youth" Guest House

== Transport and security ==
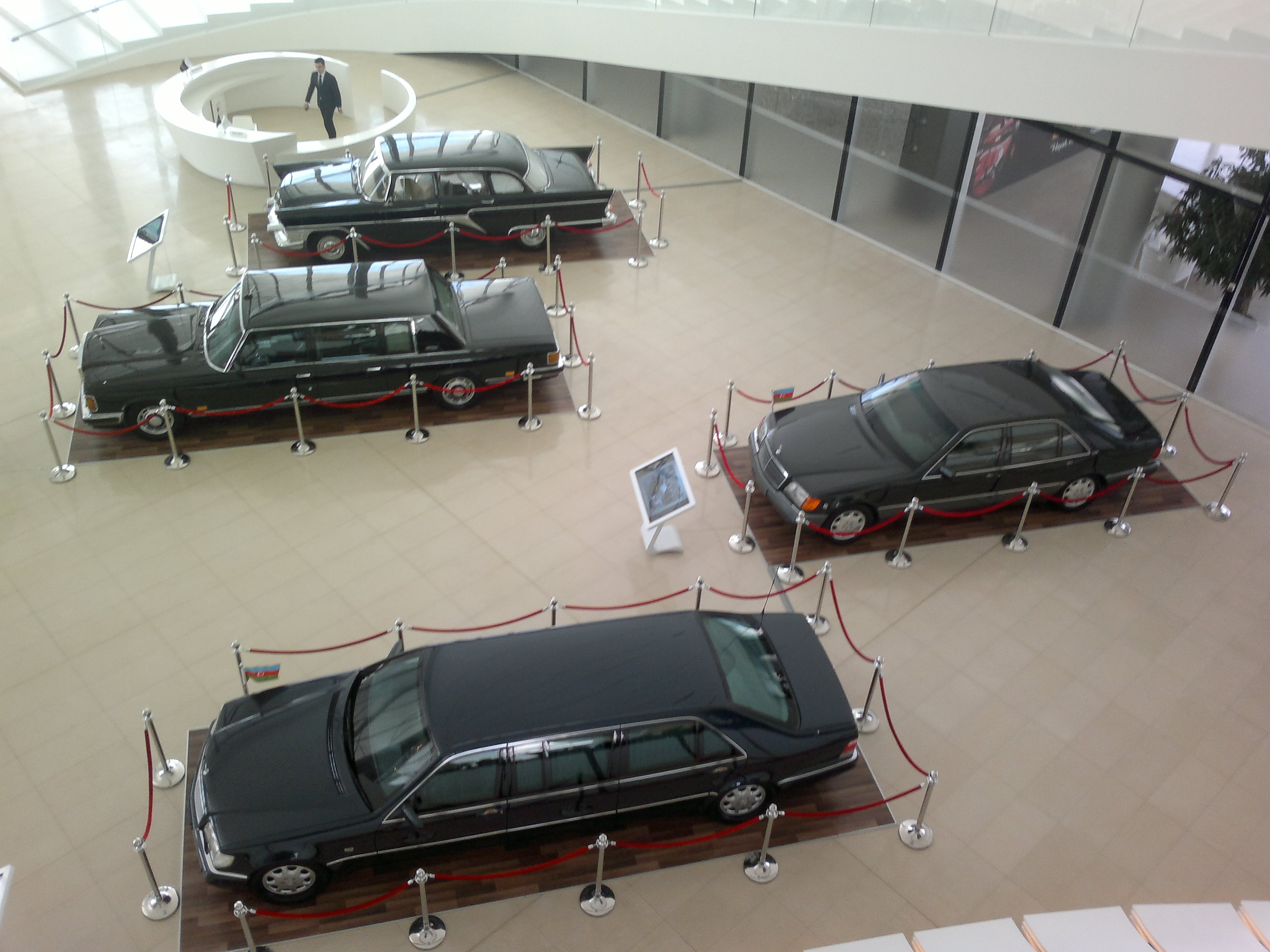
Cars which belonged to Heydar Aliyev in Heydar Aliyev Center (GAZ-13, ZIL-41047, 1991 W140-600, 1994 W140-limo)

National transport services for the Azerbaijan president are provided by the Special Purpose Garage, which is a unit within the Special State Protection Service.

- Limousines
  - Maybach 62
  - Mercedes-Benz W221
- Honorary escort (motorcycles)
  - BMW
- Airplanes for long-distance travel
- Boeing 767-300ER 4K-AI01 "Baku-1" Main aircraft
- Airbus A319-100 4K-AI02 "Baku-2"
- Gulfstream G550 4K-AI06

The presidential aircraft uses the same colour scheme as standard AZAL aircraft, except for the use of the Azerbaijan coat of arms or the Presidential Standard on the empennage instead of the flag of Azerbaijan.

== Presidents of the Republic of Azerbaijan (1990–present) ==
| No. | President (Birth–Death) | | Term of office | | | Political party | Government | Elected | Ref |
| No. | Portrait | Name | Took office | Left office | Time in office | Political party | Government | Elected | Ref |
|---|---|---|---|---|---|---|---|---|---|
| 1 | | Ayaz Mutallibov; Azerbaijani: Ayaz Mütəllibov (1938–2022) | 18 May 1990 | 6 March 1992 | 1 year, 293 days | Communist | 1. Mütəllibov II | 1990; 1991 | |
| 1 | | Ayaz Mutallibov; Azerbaijani: Ayaz Mütəllibov (1938–2022) | First Nagorno-Karabakh War; Khojaly Massacre; Capture of Shusha; 1991 Azerbaijani Mil Mi-8 shootdown. Forced to submit his resignation after pressure from Azerbaijan Popular Front. | | | | | | |
| – | | Yagub Mammadov (acting); Azerbaijani: Yaqub Məmmədov (born 1941) | 6 March 1992 | 14 May 1992 | 69 days | None | — | — | |
| – | | Yagub Mammadov (acting); Azerbaijani: Yaqub Məmmədov (born 1941) | Ousted by the armed revolt led by Azerbaijan Popular Front. | | | | | | |
| (1) | | Ayaz Mutallibov; Azerbaijani: Ayaz Mütəllibov (1938–2022) | 14 May 1992 | 18 May 1992 | 4 days | None | Mütəllibov II | — | |
| (1) | | Ayaz Mutallibov; Azerbaijani: Ayaz Mütəllibov (1938–2022) | Deposed from his duty after takeover by Azerbaijan Popular Front. | | | | | | |
| – | | Isa Gambar (acting); Azerbaijani: İsa Qəmbər (born 1957) | 18 May 1992 | 17 June 1992 | 30 days | Musavat | — | — | |
| – | | Isa Gambar (acting); Azerbaijani: İsa Qəmbər (born 1957) | Assumed temporary duties of president until the national elections in 1992. | | | | | | |
| 2 | | Abulfaz Elchibey; Azerbaijani: Əbülfəz Elçibəy (1938–2000) | 17 June 1992 | 24 June 1993 | 1 year, 7 days | Azerbaijani Popular Front Party | 2. Elçibəy I | 1992 | |
| 2 | | Abulfaz Elchibey; Azerbaijani: Əbülfəz Elçibəy (1938–2000) | Among the Soviet republics the Russian army was first withdrawn from Azerbaijan; The national currency of Azerbaijan was put into circulation; State Treasure Foundation was established; Entrance examinations to the high and vocational educational was held with test method for the first time; The foundation of private institutions in the education field was permitted; The passage to the Latin alphabet; Founded the SOCAR; Re-established Azerbaijani Armed Forces; Operation Goranboy. | | | | | | |
| – | | Heydar Aliyev; Azerbaijani: Heydər Əliyev (1923–2003) | 24 June 1993 | 10 October 1993 | 108 days | New Azerbaijan Party | 3. H.Əliyev II | — | |
| 3 | | Heydar Aliyev; Azerbaijani: Heydər Əliyev (1923–2003) | 10 October 1993 | 31 October 2003 | 10 years, 21 days | New Azerbaijan Party | 3. H.Əliyev II | 1993; 1998 | |
| 3 | | Heydar Aliyev; Azerbaijani: Heydər Əliyev (1923–2003) | Founded the YAP; Heydar Aliyev's cult of personality; Baku–Tbilisi–Ceyhan pipeline; South Caucasus Pipeline; 1994 Baku Metro bombings. Survived coup attempt in 1995. | | | | | | |
| 4 | | Ilham Aliyev; Azerbaijani: İlham Əliyev (born 1961) | 31 October 2003 | Incumbent | 22 years, 344 days | New Azerbaijan Party | 6. İ.Əliyev I | 2003; 2008; 2013; 2018; 2024 | |
| 4 | | Ilham Aliyev; Azerbaijani: İlham Əliyev (born 1961) | Azerbaijan was elected as a non-permanent member to United Nations Security Council; foiled 2007 Baku terrorist plot; Azerbaijan State Oil Academy shooting; 2010 Mardakert skirmishes; 2011 Azerbaijani protests; Eurovision Song Contest 2012; 2013 Baku protests; 2014 Armenian–Azerbaijani clashes; 2014 Nagorno-Karabakh Mil Mi-24 shootdown; 2015 European Games; 2016 Nagorno-Karabakh clashes; Baku City Circuit; 2017 Islamic Solidarity Games; 2020 Armenian–Azerbaijani clashes; 2020 Nagorno-Karabakh conflict. 2023 Azerbaijani offensive in Nagorno-Karabakh | | | | | | |

== Latest election ==
| Candidate | Party | Votes | % |
|---|---|---|---|
| Ilham Aliyev | New Azerbaijan Party | 4,567,458 | 92.12 |
| Zahid Oruj | Independent | 107,632 | 2.17 |
| Fazil Mustafa | Great Order Party | 98,421 | 1.99 |
| Qüdrat Hasanquliyev | Whole Azerbaijan Popular Front Party | 85,411 | 1.72 |
| Razi Nurullayev | National Front Party | 39,643 | 0.80 |
| Elşad Musayev | Great Azerbaijan Party | 32,885 | 0.66 |
| Fuad Aliyev | Independent | 26,517 | 0.53 |
| Total | | 4,957,967 | 100.00 |
| Valid votes | | 4,957,967 | 99.80 |
| Invalid/blank votes | | 9,828 | 0.20 |
| Total votes | | 4,967,795 | 100.00 |
| Registered voters/turnout | | 6,514,222 | 76.26 |
Source: CEC

== See also ==
- Vice President of Azerbaijan
- Prime Minister of Azerbaijan
