= Samir Nuriyev =

Azerbaijani politician (born 1975)

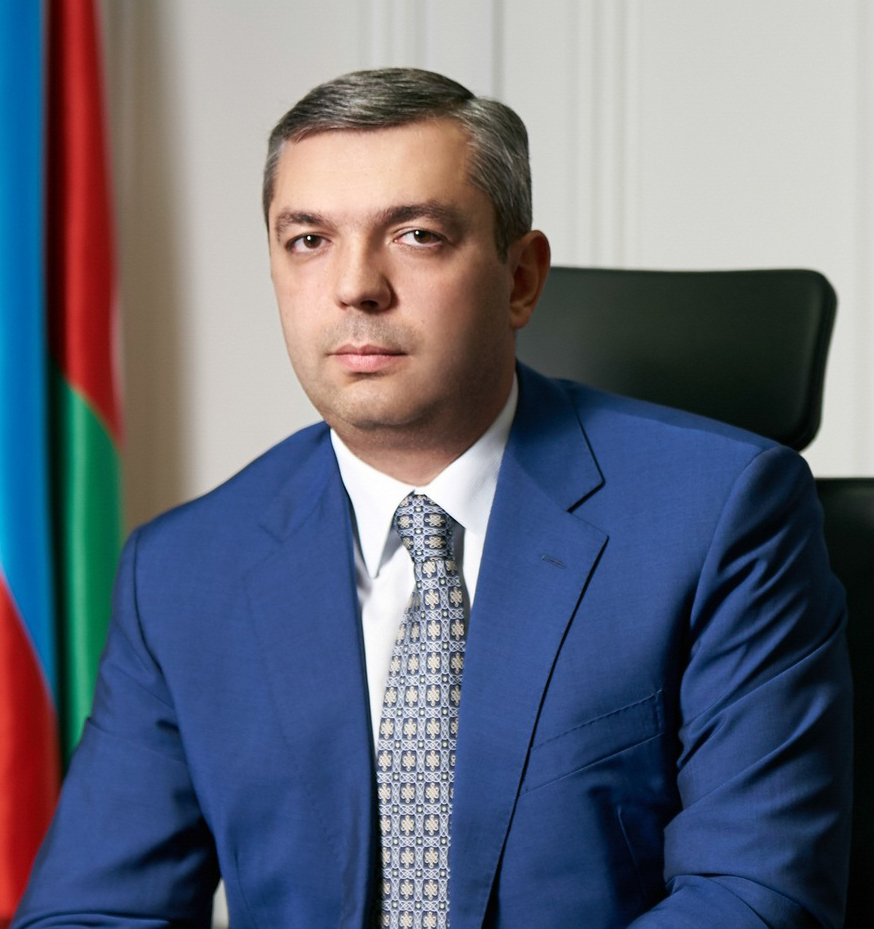
- Nuriyev in 2020

Head of Presidential Administration
- Incumbent
- Assumed office November 1, 2019
- President: Ilham Aliyev
- Preceded by: Ramiz Mehdiyev

Chairman of State Committee for City Building and Architecture
- In office April 21, 2018 – November 1, 2019
- Succeeded by: Abbas Alasgarov

Chairman of the Board of the State Housing Development Agency
- In office February 14, 2018 – April 21, 2018

Director of the Board of the State Housing Development Agency
- In office April 12, 2016 – February 14, 2018

Chief of the Icherisheher State Historical-Architectural Reserve Department
- In office May 24, 2013 – April 12, 2016
- Succeeded by: Asger Alekberov

Deputy Chief of the Icherisheher State Historical-Architectural Reserve Department
- In office November 17, 2009 – May 24, 2013

Personal details
- Born: March 9, 1975 (age 51) Baku, Azerbaijan SSR, USSR
- Education: Azerbaijan Technical University; Duke University

Samir Rafig ogly Nuriyev (Azerbaijani: Samir Rafiq oğlu Nuriyev) is an Azerbaijani politician who is the head of presidential administration (since 2019), was the chair of State Committee for City Building and Architecture (2018–2019), and the chair of the board of the State Housing Development Agency (2018), served as the chief of the Icherisheher State Historical-Architectural Reserve Department (2013–2016).

== Biography ==
Nuriyev was born in Baku, Azerbaijan on March 9, 1975. He is married, with three children. He entered the Azerbaijan Technical University in 1991 and graduated from the School of Engineering and Management in 1996 with a degree in Engineering and Economics with honors. He continued his education at Duke University in the United States in 2003–2005 and received a master's degree in International Development Policy.

== Career ==
From 1996 to 2003, Nuriyev worked in various private companies and international organizations as an economist, marketing manager, and project coordinator. In 2000–2001 he worked as a Business Consultant at the UNDP Office in Azerbaijan.

In 2006 he was appointed the Director of the Department of Entrepreneurship Development at the Ministry of Economic Development of the Republic of Azerbaijan.

According to the relevant decrees of the President of the Republic of Azerbaijan, in 2009, Nuriyev was appointed a Deputy Chief of the Icherisheher State Historical-Architectural Reserve Department under the Cabinet of Ministers of the Republic of Azerbaijan, and in 2013 – Chief of the same Department.

Nuriyev was appointed the Director of the Board of the State Housing Development Agency under Presidential Decree dated April 12, 2016, the Chairman of State Committee for City Building and Architecture under decree dated April 21, 2018, and then the Head of Presidential Administration on November 1, 2019.

== Social activity ==
He is a member of the New Azerbaijan Party. Besides being a politician, Nuriyev is also an honorary member of the Union of Architects of Azerbaijan.
