= Ramiz Mehdiyev =

Azerbaijani academic & politician (born 1938)

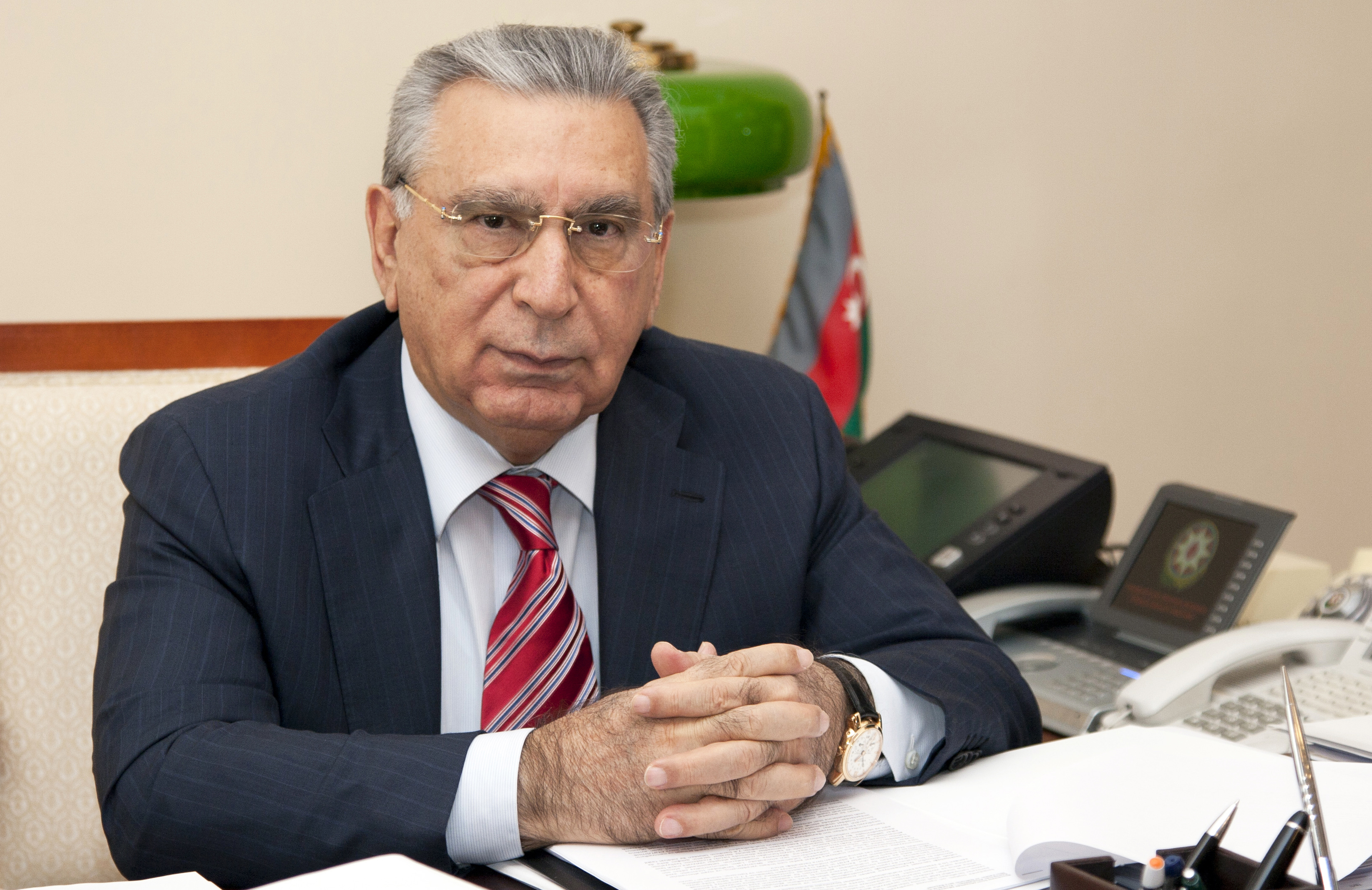

Head of the Presidential Administration of Azerbaijan
- In office February 7, 1995 – October 23, 2019
- President: Heydar Aliyev; Ilham Aliyev
- Preceded by: Mikail Nazarov
- Succeeded by: Samir Nuriyev

President of Azerbaijan National Academy of Sciences
- In office October 23, 2019 – February 14, 2022

Personal details
- Born: April 17, 1938 (age 88) Baku, Azerbaijan SSR, Soviet Union (now Baku, Azerbaijan)
- Party: New Azerbaijan Party
- Education: Azerbaijan State University; Moscow State University (PhD, 1972)

Ramiz Anvar oghlu Mehdiyev (Azerbaijani: Ramiz Ənvər oğlu Mehdiyev; Russian: Рамиз Энвер оглы Meхтиев, romanized: Ramiz Enver ogly Mekhtiev; born April 17, 1938) is an Azerbaijani politician and academician who served as the Head of the Presidential Administration of Azerbaijan from 1994 to 2019 and the National Academy of Sciences of Azerbaijan between 2019 and 2022.

In October 2025, pro-government news outlets in Azerbaijan reported that Mehdiyev had been charged with money laundering, treason, and attempted coup, with a court imposing four months of house arrest while he faces potential imprisonment of up to 20 years.

== Early life ==
Mehdiyev was born in Baku. His father was born in the Sharur District of the Nakhchivan Autonomous Republic. He attended Baku Maritime School (Note: Azerbaijani: Bakı Dənizçilik Məktəbini) (now Azerbaijan State Marine Academy) in his youth, until his graduation in 1957.

== Career in the Soviet Union ==
In 1957, he was hired as a maritime engineer by the state-run oil company Xəzər Dəniz Neft Donanması ("Caspian Sea Oil Fleet") at which time he became very active in his local Komsomol branch. In 1961, Mehdiyev enrolled in the history department (then called the S.M. Kirov department) at Azerbaijan State University (now Baku State University) in Baku. His activity in the Baku Komsomol branch earned him the attention of Azerbaijan Communist Party officials, and he was promoted to a position as a student adviser for the Azerbaijani branch of the Vladimir Lenin All-Union Pioneer Organization in 1965.

It was during this time that he'd be acquainted with Heydar Aliyev, a fellow Azerbaijani with Nakhchivan roots who at the time was a high-ranking official in the Azerbaijani KGB, headquartered down the street from the university. After his graduation from ASU, Mehdiyev was elected in 1967 to a secretary position of the Komsomol wing of the Nakhchivan Communist Party (regional branch of the Azerbaijan Communist Party in charge of the Nakhchivan ASSR). However, he was quickly admitted to Moscow State University (then known just as Lomonosov University) in 1968 as a PhD candidate in social philosophy.

During Mehdiyev's time in Moscow in 1969, Heydar Aliyev was elected First Secretary of the Central Committee of the Azerbaijan Communist Party. Upon defense of his dissertation, titled V.I. Lenin on the Interactions of Nationalism and Opportunism, (Note: Azerbaijani: V.İ.Lenin millətçiliyin və opportunizmin qarşılıqlı əlaqəsi haqqında) Mehdiyev was awarded his PhD in May 1972. Mehdiyev returned immediately to Baku having been granted a job as a professor in the Scientific Communism Department of Azerbaijan State University. Aliyev's ambitious plans for improving education, bolstering ideological rigor, and cracking down on corruption in the Azerbaijan SSR were aided by the return of Mehdiyev to Azerbaijan and the resumption of his party work, which still focused heavily on students and youth.

In 1974, Mehdiyev was appointed as a lecturer in the Ideology and Propaganda department, as well as assistant director of the Science and Education committee of the Azerbaijan Communist Party. In 1978, he was appointed the first secretary of the 26 Baku Commissars Party Committee. In 1980, he was elected to the Party's Central Committee and became the director of Party Organization.

== Later career ==
In 1988, Mehdiyev was made department director of the Institute of Political Research for the Azerbaijan National Academy of Sciences. In the 1980s and 1990s, he was a deputy to the Supreme Soviet of Azerbaijan SSR, elected twice. In 1993, Heydar Aliyev was elected President of Azerbaijan (now an independent country) and Mehdiyev was subsequently elected to the National Assembly of Azerbaijan. On February 7, 1995, Aliyev appointed Mehdiyev to be the Head of the Presidential Administration of Azerbaijan. This move was thought to be partially influenced by Aliyev's desire to keep a close-knit group of Nakhchivan advisers to consolidate power in the region.

In 2007, Mehdiyev was selected to be a full member of the Azerbaijan National Academy of Sciences (ANAS). He is also Chairman of the Editorial Board of the "Philosophy and Social and Political Sciences" journal published by the Azerbaijan Philosophy and Social-Political Sciences Association (AFSEA).

According to the decree signed by the President of Azerbaijan Ilham Aliyev on September 8, 2020 on amending the decree "On approval of the new composition of the Pardon Commission under the President of the Republic of Azerbaijan", the chairman of the Pardon Commission under the President of the Republic of Azerbaijan Ramiz Mehdiyev was dismissed. Head of the Presidential Administration of the Republic of Azerbaijan Samir Nuriyev was appointed the new chairman.

== Academic works and writings ==
Mehdiyev is the author of over 250 scientific articles on social phenomena, economic development, and philosophy and dialectics, focusing on the post-Soviet development of Azerbaijan. He has also published over 20 books, 7 of which have been translated to different languages. These include: Interethnic relations at the end of the 20th century (his second doctoral thesis), Realities of Azerbaijani genocide, Dialectics of development of Azerbaijan, Azerbaijan: historical heritage and philosophy of independence, Philosophy textbook, Azerbaijan: Calls for globalization, Parliament elections of 2005: preliminary analysis, Ideas, opening the paths to civil society, On the path of national ideology, statehood and independence in two volumes, On the path to democracy, and Determining the development strategy: modernization course.

Mehdiyev has been awarded with two Orders of the Red Banner of Labour, the Order of Glory (Shohrat Order) and was elected a member of New York Academy of Sciences in 2001.

== See also ==
- Cabinet of Azerbaijan
