= Presidential Administration of Azerbaijan =

Office of the President of Azerbaijan

The Office of Azerbaijan President
- Azərbaycan Respublikası Prezidentinin Administrasiyası
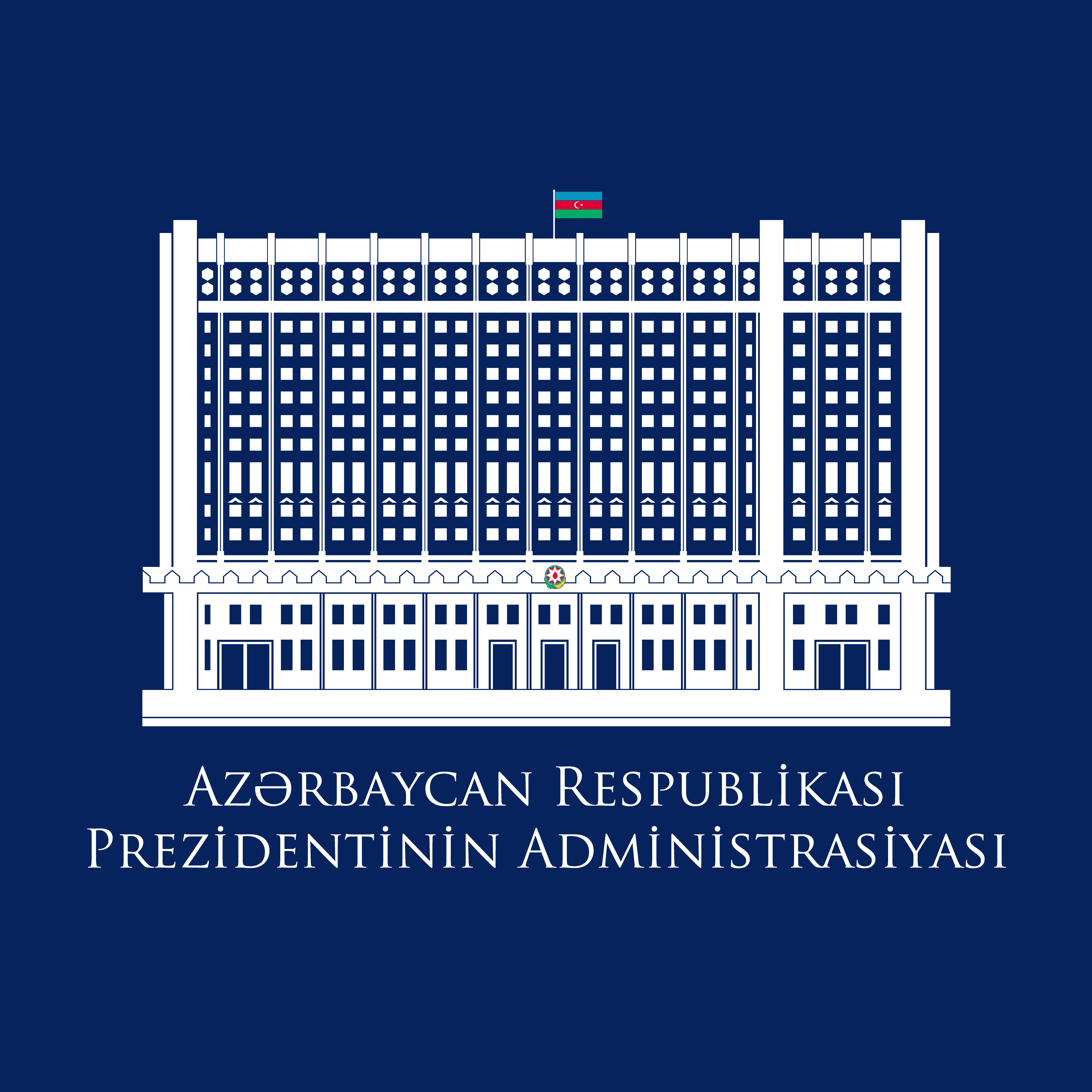
- Official logo of the Presidential Administration

Agency overview
- Formed: 18 May 1990
- Jurisdiction: Executive
- Headquarters: 19 Istiglaliyyat Street, Baku, Azerbaijan AZ1066; 40°21′49.44″N 49°49′47.49″E
- Agency executives: Ilham Aliyev, President of Azerbaijan; Samir Nuriyev, Head of Office
- Website: president.az

The Office of the President of Azerbaijan (Azerbaijani: Azərbaycan Respublikası Prezidentinin Administrasiyası) is the executive administration of President of Azerbaijan. The office is in charge of fulfilling the constitutional responsibilities of the President. The headquarters of office is located on Istiglaliyyat Street of the capital city, Baku.

== History ==
The Office of the President of Azerbaijan was established on 18 May 1990. The administration is located in a twelve-story building with surface made of marble and granite. The construction of the building, initiated by the First Secretary of Communist Party of Azerbaijan SSR Heydar Aliyev and supervised by project manager Fuad Orujov and architects Tahir Allahverdiyev and Madat Khalafov, was started in 1978 and completed in 1986. It was then occupied by the Central Committee of the Communist Party of Azerbaijan. After 18 May 1990, the building was assigned to the President of Azerbaijan and his administration and it was renamed the Presidential Palace in 2003.

== Structure ==
The Office of the Head of the Presidential Administration of Azerbaijan was headed by Ramiz Mehdiyev, and currently is headed by Samir Nuriyev. The structure of the office is as follows:

- Assistants to the President of the Republic of Azerbaijan
- Secretariat of the President of the Republic of Azerbaijan
- Secretariat of the First Vice-President of the Republic of Azerbaijan
- Assistant to the President - Head of the Department of State Control Affairs
- Assistant to the President - Head of the Department for Territorial and Organizational Issues
- Assistant to the President - Head of the Department of Military Affairs
- Assistant to the President - Head of the Department for Work with Law Enforcement Bodies
- Assistant to the President - Head of the Department of Foreign Affairs
- Assistant to the President - Head of the Department of Economic Issues and Innovative Development Policy
- Assistant to the President - Head of the Department of Economic Policy and Industrial Issues
- Press Secretary of the President
- Protocol Service of the President
- Department of Civil Service and Human Resources Issues
- Department of Youth Policy and Sport Issues
- Department of Humanitarian Policy, Diaspora, Multiculturalism and Religious Issues
- Department of Legal Expertise
- Department of Legislation and Legal Policy
- Department for Work and Communication with NGOs
- Department for Relations with Political Parties and Legislative Authority
- Department for Work with Documents
- Department for Work with Citizens' Inquiries
- Administrative Department

== List of Heads ==
No.	Leader	Start date	Expiration date	Political party
Heads of the Office of the President of the Republic of Azerbaijan (1990–1991)
1	Mikayil Nazarov	September 12, 1990	November 25, 1991	Communist Party of Azerbaijan
1	Mikayil Nazarov	September 12, 1990	November 25, 1991	Independent
Heads of the Executive Office of the President of the Republic of Azerbaijan (1995–2009)
1	Ramiz Mehdiyev	February 7, 1995	April 2, 2009	New Azerbaijan Party
Heads of the Administration of the President of the Republic of Azerbaijan (since 2010)
1	Ramiz Mehdiyev	April 2, 2009	October 23, 2019	New Azerbaijan Party
2	Samir Nuriyev	November 1, 2019	Currently	Independent

== See also ==
- Government of Azerbaijan
- Cabinet of Azerbaijan
- National Assembly of Azerbaijan
