= Azerbaijan International University =

- Azərbaycan Beynəlxalq Universiteti
- Other name: ABU
- Type: Private
- Active: 1997–2010
- Rector: Elshad Abdullayev
- Location: Baku, Azerbaijan; 40.4351026°N 49.8558467°E
- Campus: Urban
- Colors: Green and white
- Website: www.abu.az
- Location in Baku, Azerbaijan Azerbaijan International University (Azerbaijan)

Azerbaijan International University (Azerbaijani: Azərbaycan Beynəlxalq Universiteti) was a private university located in Baku, Azerbaijan. Founded in 1997, it had more than 6000 students and 268 faculty members. Graduate programs included Schools of Medicine, Dentistry, Pharmacology, Economics, Education, and Law.

The university granted bachelor's, master's and Ph.D. degrees, and became a corresponding member of International Personnel Academy of UNESCO (Kyiv) in 1999. On 30 August 2010, the Ministry of Education issued a decree annulling the license of the Azerbaijan International University.

== Corruption trial and shutting down ==
An official of the Ministry of Education announced on 24 June 2008 that law violations had been detected following an investigation and seven programs of study had been shut down. In May 2008, the student football team of the university was excluded from the all-state amateur student football championship for submitting forged student transcripts and identification cards for the players who in fact were not registered students of the Azerbaijan International University. In August 2008, the then Minister of Education Misir Mardanov voiced concerns over the functioning procedures of the university, namely its alleged student admission in contravention of the official state admission examination. Head of the State Students Admission Commission Maleyka Abbaszadeh confirmed that a preliminary investigation revealed 118 bachelor's students who had been admitted first-hand by the university in one year alone without being put through a unified state exam. Two high-ranking employees of the university responsible for student admission were charged with bribery. They admitted in court that they had accepted bribes from prospective students ranging from 1,000 to 5,000 US dollars to admit them in the university. The university was barred from admitting new students in 2009 and 2010, due to the "results of the past investigations." Finally, on 30 August 2010, the Ministry of Education issued a decree annulling the license of the Azerbaijan State University. All remaining students were transferred to nine other institutions. Rector Elshad Abdullayev disagreed with the Ministry's decision, claiming that the university had received a four-year license in 2007 and that it could not have been simply revoked, but only expire.

Lawyer Aslan Ismayilov who offered his free services to the former AIU students who had been legally admitted and were willing to transfer to other universities described the Azerbaijan International University as a "disgrace to education." He expressed an opinion that the corruption activities of Elshad Abdullayev had been well-known but concealed due to his "good connections."

== Illegal organ transplantation controversy ==
In 2010, Ukrainian authorities reported that a criminal investigation of cases of illegal organ transplantation involving citizens of Ukraine and Azerbaijan pointed at the Azerbaijan International University Medical Centre. A joint investigation carried out by Azerbaijani and Ukrainian authorities revealed that ten unlicensed surgeries were carried out by Ukrainian doctors in the centre in 2009, during which kidneys were purchased and transplanted from Azerbaijani and Ukrainian donors to foreigners. Seven people in total were charged with human trafficking, criminal group formation and illegal transplantation, one of them the former head of the AIU Medical Centre. The Azerbaijan Attorney General's Office discovered documents confirming the identities of the organ donors and recipients.
