= Aliyev family =

Azerbaijani political family

- Country: Azerbaijan (current); Historical: Azerbaijan Soviet Socialist Republic
- Current region: South Caucasus
- Origin: Comardlı, Russian Empire
- Founded: 14 July 1969; 57 years ago
- Founder: Heydar Aliyev
- Current head: Ilham Aliyev
- Seat: Zuğulba Palace
- Titles: Honorific title: National Leader; Political titles: President of Azerbaijan; Supreme commander-in-chief of the Azerbaijani Armed Forces; Leader of the New Azerbaijan Party; Vice President of Azerbaijan; Prime Minister of Azerbaijan; Chairman of the Supreme Soviet of Azerbaijan; Chairman of the Supreme Assembly of the Nakhchivan Autonomous Republic; First Secretary of the Central Committee of the Azerbaijan Communist Party; First Secretary of the Dagestan Regional Committee of the Communist Party
- Style: His/Her Excellency
- Members: Aziz Aliyev; Heydar Aliyev; Ilham Aliyev; Zarifa Aliyeva; Mehriban Aliyeva; Leyla Aliyeva; Arzu Aliyeva; Heydar Aliyev Jr. Alena Aliyeva; Hasan Aliyev; Huseyn Aliyev; Jalal Aliyev; Sevil Aliyeva; Tamerlan Aliyev; Jamil Aliyev; Gulara Aliyeva
- Connected members: Makhmud Mamed-Guliev; Arif Pashayev; Hafiz Pashayev; Nargiz Pashayeva; Emin Agalarov; Aras Agalarov; Baylar Eyyubov; Vasif Talibov
- Traditions: Sunni Islam

The Aliyev family (Azerbaijani: Əliyevlər) is an Azerbaijani political family whose members have held the highest offices in Azerbaijan since the 20th century. The family rose to prominence under Heydar Aliyev, who served as First Secretary of Soviet Azerbaijan and later as President of Azerbaijan from 1993 to 2003. He was succeeded by his son, Ilham Aliyev, who has remained in power since 2003. Other members of the family, including Mehriban Aliyeva, have also occupied senior political positions.

The Aliyev family has played a dominant role in the political life of Azerbaijan in the post-Soviet period, with power effectively concentrated within the family and its close associates. The continuity of leadership between Heydar Aliyev and his son has led some observers to describe the system as dynastic or hereditary, drawing comparisons with other modern political families that have exercised long-term control over state institutions.

== History ==
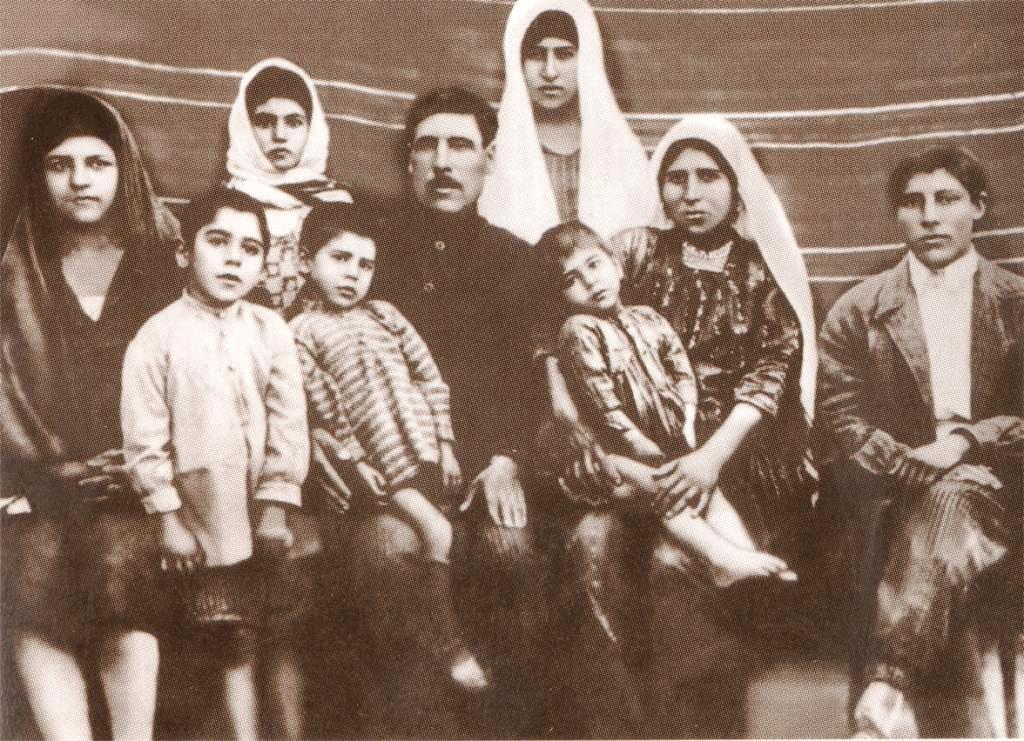
Aliyev family in 1929

The Aliyev family comes from the village of Comardlı (modern-day Tanahat in the Syunik Province of Armenia), located only a few miles from Nakhchivan. The mother of Alirza Kerbalai Jafar oglu Aliyev was from Vorotnavan (also in modern-day Syunik Province of Armenia).

In 1967, Heydar Aliyev was appointed chairman of the KGB under the Council of Ministers of the Azerbaijan Soviet Socialist Republic, and in the same year he was awarded the rank of Major General. At the Plenum of the Central Committee of the Communist Party of Azerbaijan held on July 14, 1969, Heydar Aliyev was elected First Secretary of the Central Committee of the Azerbaijan Communist Party and held this position until December 3, 1982. After the declaration of independence of Azerbaijan in 1991, Aliyev became Chairman of the Supreme Assembly of the Nakhchivan Autonomous Republic, the highest official of the exclave, determining all its foreign and domestic policies. Heydar Aliyev managed to become the head of the already independent Azerbaijan again on October 10, 1993, when he was elected the third president of the Republic of Azerbaijan, and was re-elected in 1998, and held this position until October 31, 2003.

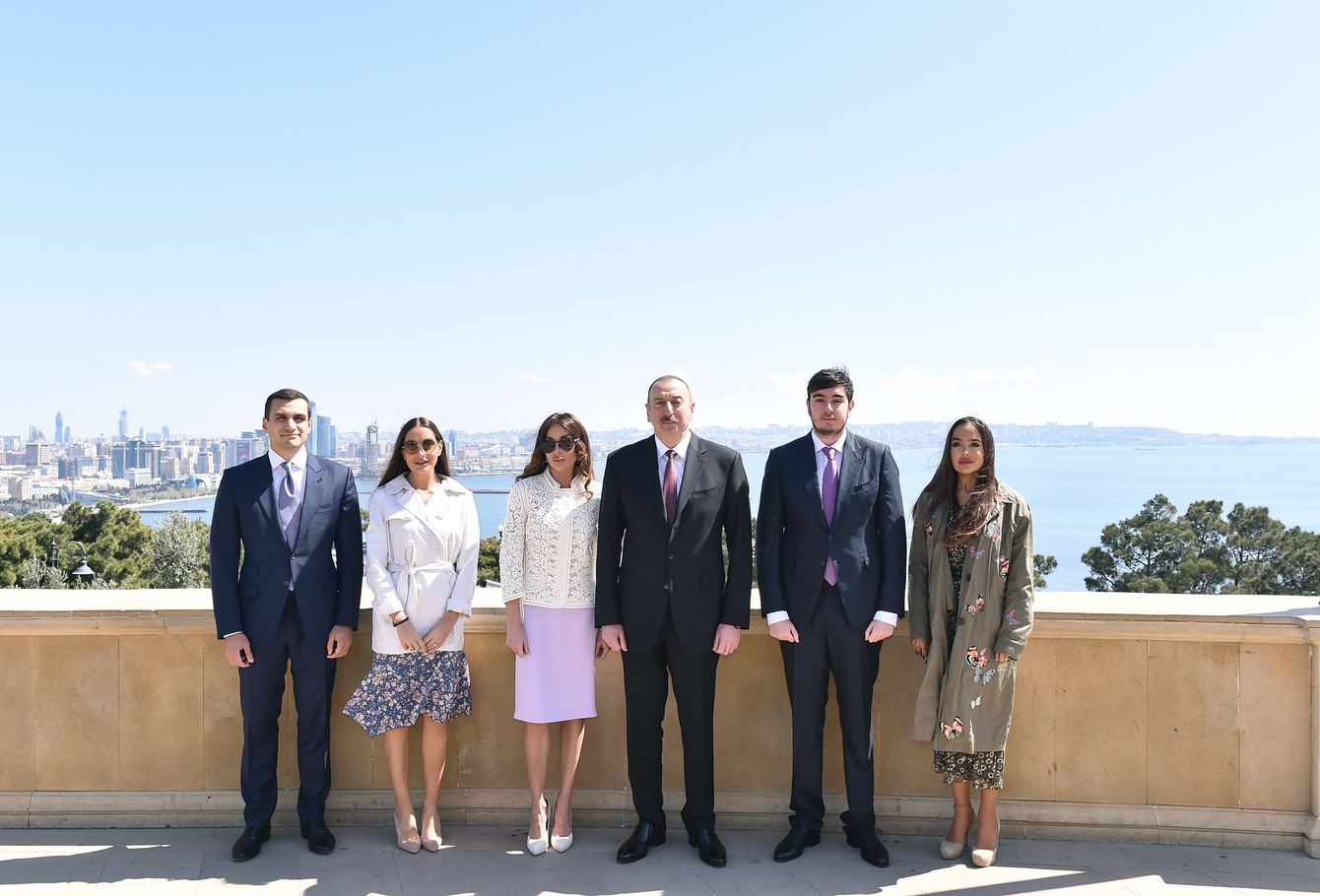
Aliyev family in 2018

After Heydar Aliyev, his son, Prime Minister Ilham Aliyev, won the presidential election in 2003, and then in subsequent elections in 2008, 2013, 2018 and 2024, and became the fourth president of Azerbaijan. On February 21, 2017, Ilham Aliyev appointed his wife, Mehriban Aliyeva, as the first Vice President of Azerbaijan.

== Family fortune ==
The Aliyev family have enriched themselves through their ties to state-run businesses. They own significant parts of several major Azerbaijani banks, construction firms and telecommunications firms, as well as partially own the country's oil and gas industries. Much of the wealth is hidden in offshore companies. The 2021 Pandora Papers leaks showed that the Aliyev family built a vast offshore network to hide their money. The family and their close associates have secretly been involved in property deals in the UK worth more than £400 million.

Andrew Higgins, writing in The Washington Post, stated in 2010 that Azerbaijanis with the same names as Ilham Aliyev's three children owned real estate in Dubai worth about $75 million. Higgins stated that some members of the family are indeed wealthy, such as the president's older daughter, Leyla, married to Emin Agalarov, a Russian billionaire, and relatives of the first lady who have businesses in Azerbaijan.

In 2012, the Organized Crime and Corruption Reporting Project called Ilham Aliyev the person of the year in organized crime and corruption. Also in 2012, CNBC produced the film Filthy Rich about corruption which also mentioned the Aliyev family.

According to a 2013 investigation by the International Consortium of Investigative Journalists (ICIJ), the Aliyev family owned at least four offshore companies directly connected with Hassan Gozal. ICIJ stated that family members never declared the Aliyevs' offshore companies, that Ilham and Mehriban Aliyevs had no legal right to open offshore companies, and that when these companies were opened, measures were taken to conceal the real owners. When registering the companies, Aliyev's daughters indicated property worth about $6 million. Investigation of Swedish television showed that offshore companies controlled by Aliyevs received from TeliaSonera the Swedish telecommunications company, a factual bribe in the form of shares of Azercell cellular operator in the amount of 600–700 million dollars (due to the estimate of 2005), which was purchased for only 6.5 million dollars. In a resolution on 10 September 2015, the European Parliament called on the EU authorities to conduct a thorough investigation of allegations of corruption against Ilham Aliyev and his family members.

Journalist Khadija Ismayilova, who worked for the United States government-funded Radio Free Europe/Radio Liberty, carried out journalistic investigations, and claimed that Aliyev's family controlled some companies such as "Azerfon", "Azenco", and assets worth $3 billion in the largest Azerbaijani banks.

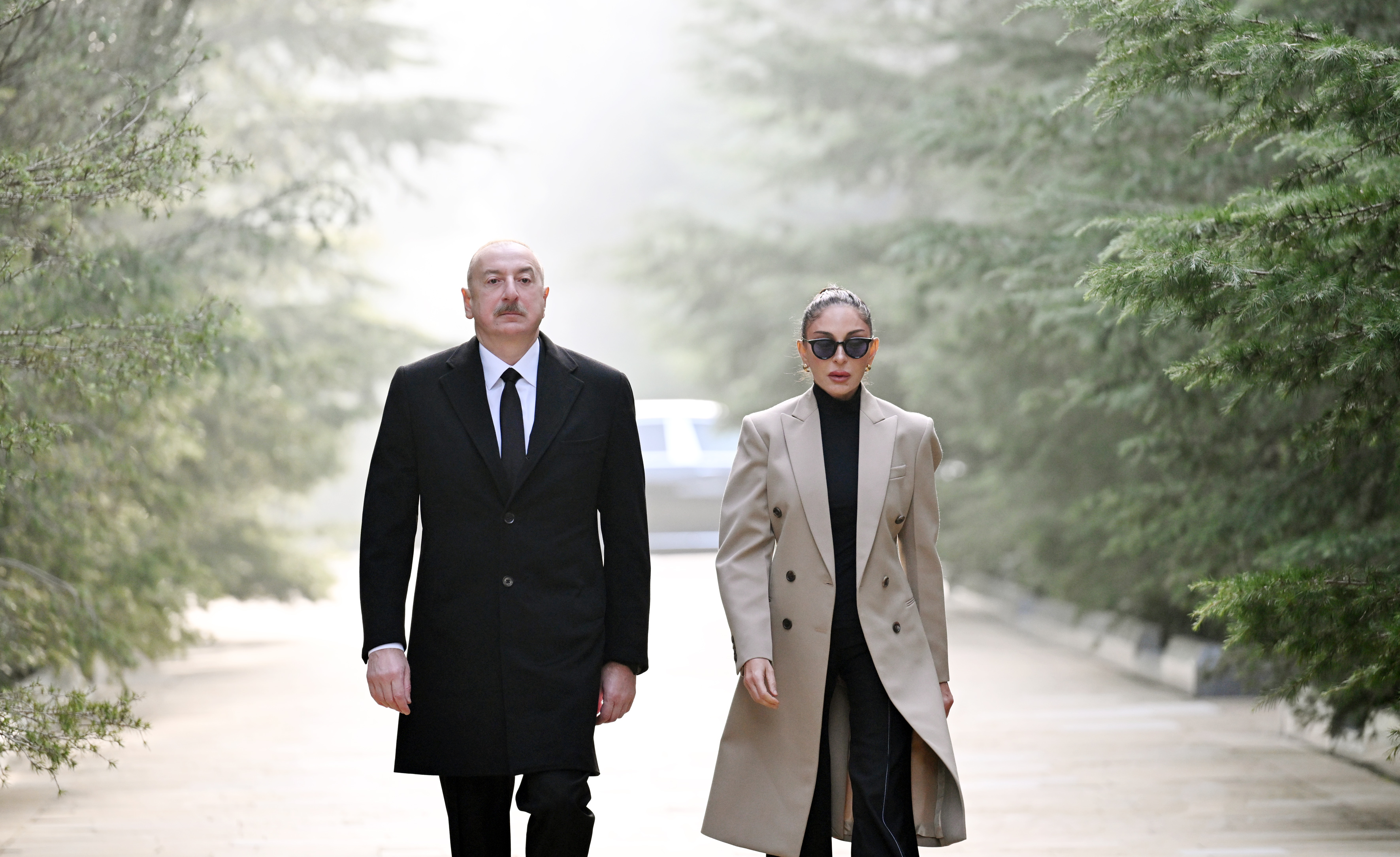
Aliyev and his wife Mehriban Aliyeva were described as the "embodiment of nepotism and kleptocracy" in Azerbaijan.

Ismayilova was later detained in December 2014 and sentenced in September 2015 to 7½ years in prison on trumped-up charges. She was conditionally released in May 2016, in 2020 she was still subject to a travel ban and had been unable to leave the country despite numerous applications to do so. Lawyers will be seeking permission for Ismayilova to travel to the UK to give evidence in the trial of Paul Radu, a Romanian journalist who is co-founder and executive director of investigative reporting group OCCRP (the Organized Crime and Corruption Reporting Project). Radu is being sued for defamation in London by Azerbaijani MP, Javanshir Feyziyev, over two articles in OCCRP's award-winning Azerbaijan Laundromat series about money-laundering out of Azerbaijan. Ismayilova, OCCRP's lead reporter in Azerbaijan, is a key witness in the case.

Aliyev was also included on a list of figures (others being the Minister of Emergency Situations Kamaladdin Heydarov, head of the Presidential Administration Ramiz Mehdiyev and First Lady Mehriban Aliyeva) accused of accepting bribes of $1,000,000 USD from MP candidates to guarantee their "election win" and inclusion to the parliament. This high-level corruption scandal is widely called the Gulargate. In US diplomatic channels, Aliyev's tactics has even been likened to those who head criminal organizations.

== See also ==
- List of political families
