= Huseyn Aliyev =

Azerbaijani painter

Huseyn Aliyev Hüseyn Əliyev
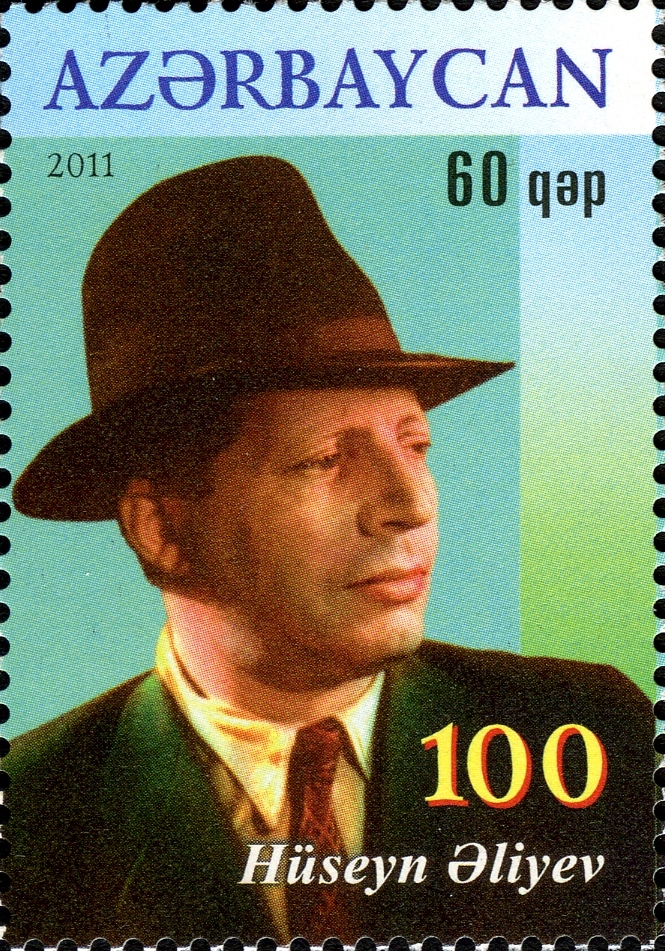
- Aliyev on a 2011 Azerbaijani stamp
- Born: Hüseyn Əlirza oğlu Əliyev; 22 April 1911; Jomerdli, Zangezursky uyezd, Elisabethpol Governorate, Russian Empire
- Died: 25 May 1991 (aged 80); Baku, Azerbaijan SSR, USSR
- Citizenship: USSR
- Occupation: Painter
- Relatives: Aliyev family: Heydar Aliyev, Jalal Aliyev, Agil Aliyev, Hasan Aliyev
- Awards: Honored Art Worker of the Azerbaijan SSR People's Artist of the Azerbaijan SSR Medal "For the Defence of the Caucasus" Jubilee Medal "Thirty Years of Victory in the Great Patriotic War 1941–1945" Order of Friendship of Peoples

Huseyn Aliyev (Azerbaijani: Hüseyn Əlirza oğlu Əliyev; 22 April 1911 – 26 May 1991) was a painter and People's Artist of the Azerbaijan SSR.

== Biography ==
Huseyn Aliyev was born in Jomerdli (Zangezursky uyezd) on 22 April 1911. He was only 12 years old when he painted his first landscape picture. He studied at the Technical School of Art in Baku in 1927-1932. Huseyn Aliyev collaborated with "Molla Nasraddin (magazine)" from 1922 to 1931, and several of his cartoons were published in the magazine.

He studied at the Leningrad Institute of Painting, Sculpture and Architecture in 1932-1935. He worked as a chief artist and then head of the art design department at the "People's Newspaper" ("Communist") from 1935 to his death.

He was a participant in the Great Patriotic War. He was awarded the medals of "For the Defence of the Caucasus', "For his honorable work in the rear front in 1941-1945", "Thirty Years of Victory in the Great Patriotic War 1941–1945" and the order of "Friendship of Peoples". The artist was awarded with the Honorary Decree of Azerbaijan three times and of The Supreme Soviet of Ukraine. Huseyn Aliyev, a member of the Artists' Union since 1940, was awarded the title of Honorary Artist in 1977 and People's Artist in 1982.

Huseyn Aliyev was not only a landscape painter, but he also had great portrait paintings as "Mirza Fatali Akhundov","Huseyn Javid", "Nizami Ganjavi. "Castle of Urud", "View of Zangezur", "Zangezur Mountains", "Sheki Waterfall", "View of Jomerdli", "Winter in the Forest", "Autumn", "Sunset" were his most famous landscape paintings. Huseyn Aliyev painted more than 25 watercolors of the Kapaz Mountain for 2 years. In recent years, Huseyn Aliyev's "Landscapes of Goygol" album was featured. The album has 17 landscape paintings in it.

In 2004, Huseyn Aliyev's works were demonstrated in Abu Dhabi. The exhibition for the 100th anniversary of the artist was held in Saint Petersburg in 2011.

Huseyn Aliyev died on 26 May 1991 in Baku.
