= Alasgarov =

Alasgarov (masculine, Azerbaijani: Ələsgərov) or Alasgarova (feminine, Azerbaijani: Ələsgərova), also transliterated as Aleskerov, is an Azerbaijani surname. Notable people with the surname include:

- Abbas Alasgarov (1937–2018), Azerbaijani engineer and politician
- Murtuz Alasgarov (1928–2012), Azerbaijani politician
- Shamama Alasgarova (1904–1977), Azerbaijani physician
