= Hasan Aliyev (academician) =

Soviet geographer (born 1907)

- Azerbaijani: Həsən Əliyev
- Born: Həsən Əlirza oğlu Əliyev; 15 December 1907; Jomardlu, Zangezursky Uyezd, Elisabethpol Governorate, Russian Empire
- Died: 2 February 1993 (aged 85); Baku, Azerbaijan
- Resting place: Alley of Honor
- Citizenship: Russian Empire; Azerbaijan Democratic Republic; USSR; Azerbaijan
- Education: Azerbaijan State Agricultural University
- Known for: soil scientist
- Children: Rasim Aliyev
- Relatives: Aliyev family
- Scientific career
- Fields: geography, soil science
- Institutions: Institute of Geography of ANAS

Hasan Alirza oghlu Aliyev (Azerbaijani: Həsən Əlirza oğlu Əliyev; 15 December 1907 — 2 February 1993) was an Azerbaijani scientist, socio-political figure, Honoured Scientist of the Azerbaijan SSR (1974), Secretary of the Party Committee of the Academy of Sciences of the Azerbaijan SSR (1950), First Deputy Minister of Agriculture of the Azerbaijan Republic, Secretary of the Central Committee of Azerbaijan (1952), Academic Secretary of ANAS (1952– 1957), member of the Baku Council of Labor Deputies (1953–1956), full member of the Royal Society of Bibliographers of England, director of the Institute of Geography named after academician Hasan Aliyev of ANAS (1968–1987).

== Biography ==
Hasan Aliyev was born on 15 December 1907 in Jomardlu village. His family was deported to Nakhchivan after the March genocide. After coming to Nakhchivan, he worked in various jobs in 1917-1924. He entered the village evening school in 1925. In 1930 H.Aliyev graduated from Nakhchivan Agricultural College. In 1927 during his studies at the technical school he was an employee of the department of agricultural pest control of the Land Commissariat of the Nakhchivan ASSR. In 1929, he worked as an instructor in Nakhchivan Cotton Union and Ganja branch of Azerbaijan Cotton Union. Hasan Aliyev studied at Azerbaijan Agricultural Institute in 1930-1932. In addition to studying at the institute, he worked as a teacher at Qarayeri state farm school in Ganja. In 1932 he entered the graduate school of Azerbaijan Scientific-Research Cotton Institute and graduated in 1934.In 1934 he was appointed director of Shirvan Zone-Experimental Station located in the centre of Ujar district of Azerbaijan Agricultural Cotton Institute. After working there for two years, he was hired as a researcher at the Department of Soil Science of Azerbaijan branch of the former USSR Academy of Sciences, and at the same time served as scientific secretary of that department (1935–1941). In 1935, he became a member of All-Union Society of Soil Science. In addition to research, he began teaching at universities. In 1939 he became a member of the former All-Union Geographical Society.

In 1941 he volunteered for the army. He returned to Baku in 1943 after being seriously wounded in a battle with the Germans in North Caucasus. After a long treatment, he re-entered the Azerbaijan branch of the Academy of Sciences of the former USSR and in the same year (1943) began to lead the Department of Geography. In 1944 he defended his dissertation and received the degree of Candidate of Agricultural Sciences. In 1944, he was appointed Deputy Director for Scientific Affairs of the Department of Soil Science and Agrochemistry. When Azerbaijan National Academy of Sciences was established in 1945, the department became an institute, and until 1949 he worked as a deputy director at the institute. In 1945, he was again invited to the position of senior lecturer at the Faculty of Geography of Azerbaijan Pedagogical Institute, where he worked until 1949. In 1946–1962 he was the chairman of Azerbaijan branch of the All-Union Soil Science Society, in 1949–1952 he worked as the director of the Institute of Botany of ANAS. In 1952, he was promoted to the position of First Deputy Minister of Agriculture of Azerbaijan and in the same year Secretary of the Central Committee of the Communist Party of Azerbaijan. In 1952, he served as Academician-Secretary of the Academy of Sciences of Azerbaijan due to structural changes in the former Central Committee of Azerbaijan, and in the same year was elected a full member of Azerbaijan National Academy of Sciences. For the first time between the Academy of Sciences of the USSR and the academies of sciences of the allied republics, Hasan Aliyev established the Nature Protection Commission under the Presidium of the Academy of Sciences of Azerbaijan in 1955 and headed this commission. He was a deputy of the Supreme Soviet of the Azerbaijan SSR (10th and 11th convocations).

== Scientific career ==
His main scientific work covers the theory of soil science, ecology, botany, plant growing, problems of conservation and more efficient use of natural resources and natural conditions, in general, various fields of natural science. In 1957, he organized Forest Soil Laboratory within the Institute of Soil Science and Agrochemistry of ANAS and was the head of this department for 35 years. In 1968, in connection with the appointment of the director of the Institute of Geography, the department was transferred to the Institute of Geography.

In 1965, 17 years after being elected a full member of the Academy of Sciences of Azerbaijan, he defended his doctoral dissertation on the lands of Greater Caucasus and ways of its efficient use (within the Azerbaijan SSR) and received the degree of Doctor of Agricultural Sciences. From 1968 to 1987 he headed the Institute of Geography of Azerbaijan National Academy of Sciences.

In 1977 he was elected a member of the Soviet National Committee for the first UNESCO project on man and the biosphere (tropical and subtropical ecosystems). In 1977, he participated in the First UNESCO Interstate Conference in Tbilisi. He was invited to give lectures in Bulgaria in 1976 and in Hungary in 1979. In 1975, he was elected President of the Geographical Society of the Republic and headed this public organization until 1990. In 1981, he participated in the Soviet-West German symposium in Germany. He published 751 works during 1940-1985.

== Awards ==
- Honoured Scientist of the Azerbaijan SSR — 1974
- State Prize of the Azerbaijan SSR — 1978
- Order of Lenin — 1977
- Order of the Patriotic War — 1985
- Medal "For Labour Valour" — 1945
- Order of the October Revolution — 1982
- Order of the Red Banner of Labour — 1952
- Order of the Red Star — 1945
- Order of the Badge of Honour — 1959
- Jubilee Medal "In Commemoration of the 100th Anniversary of the Birth of Vladimir Ilyich Lenin" — 1970
- Medal "Veteran of Labour" — 1977
- Medal "For the Defence of the Caucasus" — 1944
- Medal "For the Victory over Germany in the Great Patriotic War 1941–1945" — 1946
- Medal "For Valiant Labour in the Great Patriotic War 1941–1945" — 1946
- Jubilee Medal "50 Years of the Armed Forces of the USSR" — 1968
- Jubilee Medal "Thirty Years of Victory in the Great Patriotic War 1941–1945" — 1975
- Jubilee Medal "Forty Years of Victory in the Great Patriotic War 1941–1945" — 1985

== Memorial ==
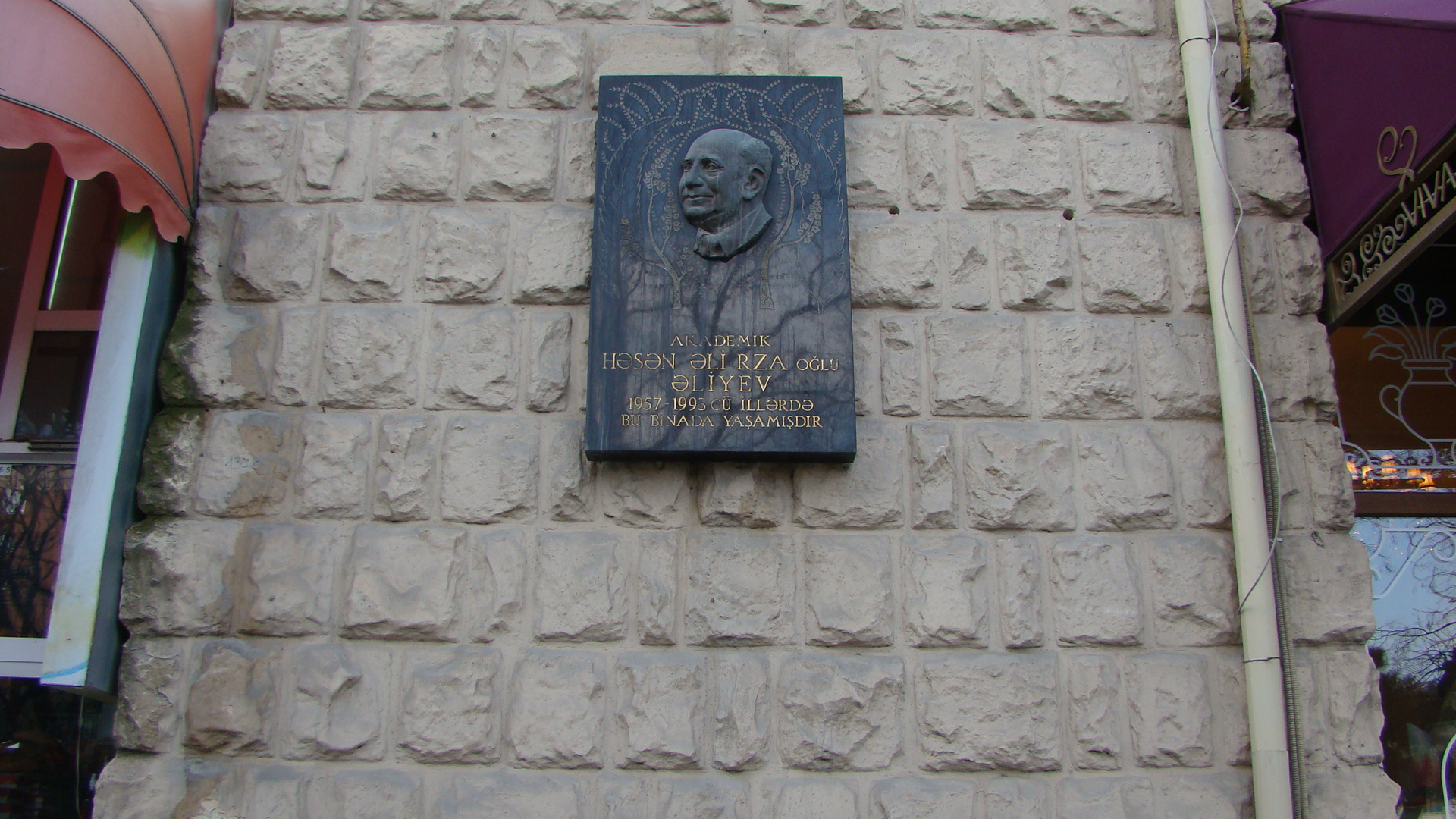
Bas-relief of Hasan Aliyev

- Institute of Geography named after academician Hasan Aliyev of ANAS
- Zangezur National Park of the Republic of Azerbaijan named after Academician Hasan Aliyev
- Academician Hasan Aliyev Street, AZ1078. Baku, Azerbaijan.
- Agro-forest massif dedicated to the 110th anniversary of Academician Hasan Aliyev

== Works ==
- Study of the lower reaches of the Pirsaat River — 1940
- Lands of the Azerbaijan SSR — 1953
- Lands of the Greater Caucasus of Azerbaijan — 1953
- Alarm bell — 1976
- Azerbaijan Nature Magazine — 1970
- Guard of nature (with K.N.Hasanov)
- The fate of the forest is in man's hands (with M.Y.Khalilov)
- Soils of arid woodlands in the foothills of the Greater Caucasus Environmental Features
- Soils of the Nakhichevan ASSR
- Brown forest lands
- Tugay forests around the Kura of Azerbaijan (with M.Y.Khalilov)
- Forest and forest-steppe lands of the North-Eastern part of the Greater Caucasus
- Mountain-forest lands of Hakarachay basin and their efficient use (with S.N.Mirzayev)
- Land Resources of Azerbaijan, their rational use and protection (with S.G.Hasanov and R.A.Aliyev)

In early 1955, he published articles in the periodicals on nature conservation:

- Development of nature protection science in the Azerbaijan SSR
- The state of protection and increase of natural resources in the Azerbaijan SSR
- Nature parks of Azerbaijan
- Child care for mother nature
- Our forests
- The green dress of our homeland
- Our new reserves
- Products and fertilizers

== Maps ==
1. Schematic land map of the Azerbaijan SSR (with V.R.Volubuyev. 1949)
2. Land map of Qusar district of the Azerbaijan SSR (1959)
3. Land map of the mountainous part of the Davachi district of the Azerbaijan SSR (1959)
4. Land map of Azerbaijan (with S.G.Hasanov, N.S.Isgandarov, M.R.Babayev, G.S.Mammadov. 1980)
5. Atlas of the Azerbaijan SSR (General Department of Geodesy and Cartography under the USSR Council of Ministers.1979–40s)
