= Aziz Aliyev =

Azerbaijani Soviet scientist and politician

- Əziz Əliyev
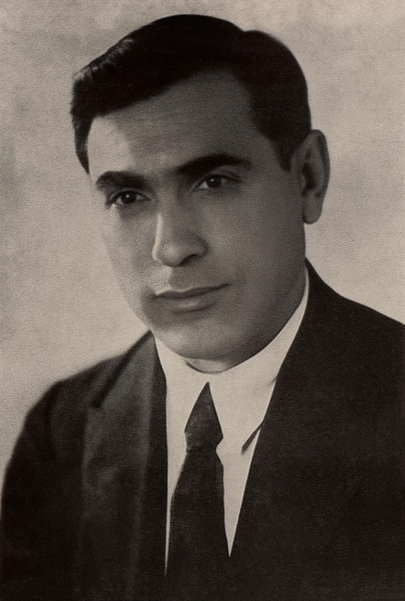
- Aliyev in 1935

People's Commissar for Health of the Azerbaijan SSR
- In office 1939–1941

First Secretary of the Dagestan Regional Committee of the Communist Party
- In office 1942–1948

Personal details
- Born: 20 December 1896 Hamamli, Erivan Governorate, Russian Empire (now Spitak, Armenia)
- Died: 27 July 1962 (aged 65) Baku, Azerbaijan SSR, Soviet Union
- Party: Communist Party of the Soviet Union
- Spouse: Leyla Abbasova
- Children: Tamerlan Aliyev; Zarifa Aliyeva; Gulara Aliyeva; Jamil Aliyev
- Relatives: Aliyev family
- Occupation: Politician

Aziz Mammad Karim oghlu Aliyev (Azerbaijani: Əziz Məmməd Kərim oğlu Əliyev; 20 December 1896 – 27 July 1962) was an Azerbaijani, Dagestani, and Soviet politician, scientist, and member of the Supreme Soviet of the USSR. He was the father-in-law of Azerbaijan's President Heydar Aliyev, who married his daughter Zarifa Aliyeva in 1948, maternal grandfather of Azerbaijan's current President Ilham Aliyev and brother of Shamama Alasgarova, who was a doctor.

== Early life ==
Aziz Aliyev, due to his high academic standing, was exempt from paying for education, fortunately for his family, who were in financial need. After graduating with honours, Aliyev was sponsored by philanthropist Zeynalabdin Taghiyev to enter the Russian Medical Military Academy in Saint Petersburg in 1917. Because of the October Revolution and civil unrest in the South Caucasus marked by political instability and ethnic cleansings, Aliyev had to return to Armenia in 1918 and fled with his family first to Shahtakhti (a town in Nakhchivan) and then to northern Iran. In the early 1920s, he worked in aid posts in Erivan, Nakhchivan, and on the southern bank of the Aras River. In 1923 he came to Baku to work in the administrative department of the Azerbaijan Council of Ministers and finish his undergraduate degree in medical studies. In 1937 he earned a Ph.D. degree in medicine.

== Medical career ==
In 1928 Aziz Aliyev worked as head of the medical department of the Azerbaijan People's Commissariat (Ministry) of Health Care. In 1929 he was promoted to deputy minister of health care and director of the Azerbaijan State Clinical Institute. In 1934 he became head of the Baku Department of Health Care. In 1935 he was appointed head of the Azerbaijan Medical University. During these years he published a number of articles and textbooks, and was editor of the Azerbaijani Medical Journal. From January to May 1937, Aliyev was also rector of the Azerbaijan State University.

== Political career ==
In 1938 Aziz Aliyev was elected secretary of the Azerbaijan SSR Supreme Soviet. In 1939–1941 he served as Azerbaijan Minister of Health Care. In 1941, after the Soviet invasion of Iranian Azerbaijan and Iranian Kurdistan, Aliyev was deployed to Tabriz on a political mission. The goal of his council (later known as the "Aziz Aliyev Group") was to establish ties with local Communists and to propagate Communism on political, social, and cultural levels.

=== Dagestan ===
On 16 September 1942 Joseph Stalin appointed Aliyev Secretary of the Dagestan Regional Committee of the Communist Party of the Soviet Union, the highest authority in the Dagestan ASSR. During the six years that he served in this position, Aliyev managed to put an end to hostility expressed by the locals towards the central government. At the peak of the Great Patriotic War, desertion, driven by mutual distrust between the Soviet authorities and the peoples of the Caucasus, was a huge issue (in 1944 it would lead to the deportation of over 600,000 residents of the North Caucasus into Central Asia that did not affect Dagestanis). In November 1942, Aliyev held a meeting with aul leaders, aiming to reconcile them with the Communist government. He openly supported the heritage of Imam Shamil, the 19th century Muslim leader of an anti-Russian resistance, that is well-celebrated by Dagestanis but had been frowned upon and dismissed by the Kremlin at the time due to its religious and nationalist nature.

Aziz Aliyev's party leadership in Dagestan was marked by significant improvements in the medical, educational, and cultural spheres. The Dagestan branch of the Academy of Sciences of the USSR, the Dagestan State Pedagogical University (founded as the Dagestani Women Teachers Institute), a number of theaters, and professional medical schools of this autonomous republic were founded during Aliyev's term. He was twice awarded the Order of Lenin, the highest national order of the Soviet Union.

=== Azerbaijan ===
Aziz Aliyev's successful career was a matter of speculation among government officials in Azerbaijan, particularly Mir Jafar Baghirov, the communist leader of Azerbaijan SSR in the Stalinist era. Concerned by rumors of being replaced by Aliyev, Baghirov managed to have him fired from the executive power of Dagestan and sent to Moscow to work as an inspector in the Central Committee of the Communist Party of the Soviet Union. In 1950, Aliyev was appointed Deputy Chairman of the Azerbaijan SSR Supreme Soviet. In 1951 he was fired from the government and became director of the Institute of Orthopædy. In 1952 he was further demoted to physician at a hospital in a Baku suburb. The official reason behind this repression was the accusation that Aliyev never reported his parents' social origin; aggravated by the fact that his sister lived in Iran. After Stalin's death and Baghirov's arrest in 1953, Aliyev was reestablished as director of the Institute of Orthopædy and secretary of the Supreme Soviet, where he worked until his death in 1962.

== Family ==
In 1920, Aziz Aliyev married Leyla Abbasova. Three of their children—Tamerlan, Zarifa, Zarifa and Jamil—pursued careers in medicine. His other daughter, Gulara Aliyeva became a composer and concertmaster. In 1948 his daughter Zarifa married Heydar Aliyev, future First Secretary of the Azerbaijan Communist Party and President of Azerbaijan in 1993–2003, and in 1955 bore their daughter Sevil Aliyeva and in 1961 bore their son Ilham Aliyev, who succeeded his father as President of Azerbaijan in 2003.

== Honours and awards ==
- Two Orders of Lenin
- Order of the Red Banner of Labour
- Order of the Patriotic War, 1st class
- Honoured Doctor of the Azerbaijan SSR
