= Hasan Aliyev =

Hasan Aliyev may refer to:

- Hasan Aliyev (academician) (1907–1993), Azerbaijani academician and politician
- Hasan Aliyev (wrestler) (born 1989), Azerbaijani Greco-Roman wrestler
