= ADA University =

University in Azerbaijan

- ADA Universiteti
- Motto: Leading Innovation and Responsible Citizenship
- Type: Public university
- Established: Azerbaijan Diplomatic; Academy (2006—2014); ADA University (2014—present)
- Affiliations: ACBCP; APSIA
- Rector: Hafiz Pashayev
- Academic staff: 212
- Students: 4340
- Location: Ahmadbey Agaoglu 61, Narimanov, Baku, Azerbaijan, Baku; 40.39°N 49.85°E
- Campus: Green and Smart Campus
- Language: English; Azerbaijani
- Academic term: Semester
- Transportation: Ganjlik metrostation
- Colors: Caspian Blue; White; Pomegranate
- Website: ada.edu.az

ADA University (ADA) (Azerbaijani: ADA Universiteti) is a public university established under the Ministry of Foreign Affairs of Azerbaijan in March 2006 by Hafiz Pashayev.

== History ==
ADA University was established on January 13, 2014, by a presidential decree as a state higher education institution, offering undergraduate and graduate programs while advancing research. The University emerged from the merger of the Azerbaijan Diplomatic Academy (ADA) and the Information Technologies University.

The Azerbaijan Diplomatic Academy, founded on March 6, 2006, initially focused on training diplomats and civil servants through its Advanced Foreign Service Program, launched in 2007. It later expanded its academic offerings, introducing its first master’s program in 2009 and bachelor’s programs in 2011, paving the way for the establishment of ADA University.

== Campuses ==
=== Baku campus ===
ADA University’s main campus in Baku, used by the university since 2013, features several key buildings, including Building A, Building B, Building D, Building E, the Student Center, Building L, and the ADA Gardens.

The Student Center includes an auditorium, exhibit hall, studios, lounges, and dining areas, serving as a central gathering place for students and faculty. The ADA University Library, a four-story facility, houses approximately 120,000 volumes and provides both physical and electronic resources, along with study and collaboration spaces.

The School of Business is connected to the Caravanserai and includes classrooms, faculty offices, and a rooftop terrace.

The architecture incorporates elements that reflect Azerbaijani culture and values.

Locations at ADA University

=== Gazakh campus ===
The ADA Gazakh Center, established in 2022, is located in the historical building of the Gazakh Teachers' Seminary, which has roots tracing back to the Tbilisi Teachers' Seminary founded in 1876. This institution played a pivotal role in the education of notable Azerbaijani figures, including Jalil Mammadguluzadeh and Uzeyir Hajibeyov. Following the collapse of the Tsarist regime in 1918, the Azerbaijani division of the Transcaucasian Teachers' Seminary was relocated to Gazakh, leading to the establishment of the Gazakh Teachers' Seminary.

The center has been renovated with support from various partners, including the Heydar Aliyev Foundation and NEQSOL Holding, emphasizing its historical significance. The Gazakh Teachers' Seminary's 100th anniversary was commemorated in 2018, alongside the 150th anniversary of Firudin bey Kocharli, an influential educator.

Since its opening, the ADA Gazakh Center has offered three master's degree programs in Azerbaijani: Master of Arts in Learning and Teaching, Master of Arts in Education Management, and Master of Public Administration. As of the 2023-2024 academic year, a total of 127 students are enrolled in these programs.

=== Washington center ===
The Washington Center of ADA University, established in 2007 as a non-profit organization in Washington, D.C., aims to support ADA University and its programs. Located near Dupont Circle and the Phillips Collection, the center occupies a building constructed in 1900, which was fully renovated in 2015.

The center spans four floors. In collaboration with ADA University, the center also manages an endowment fund to support its initiatives.

== Schools and programs ==
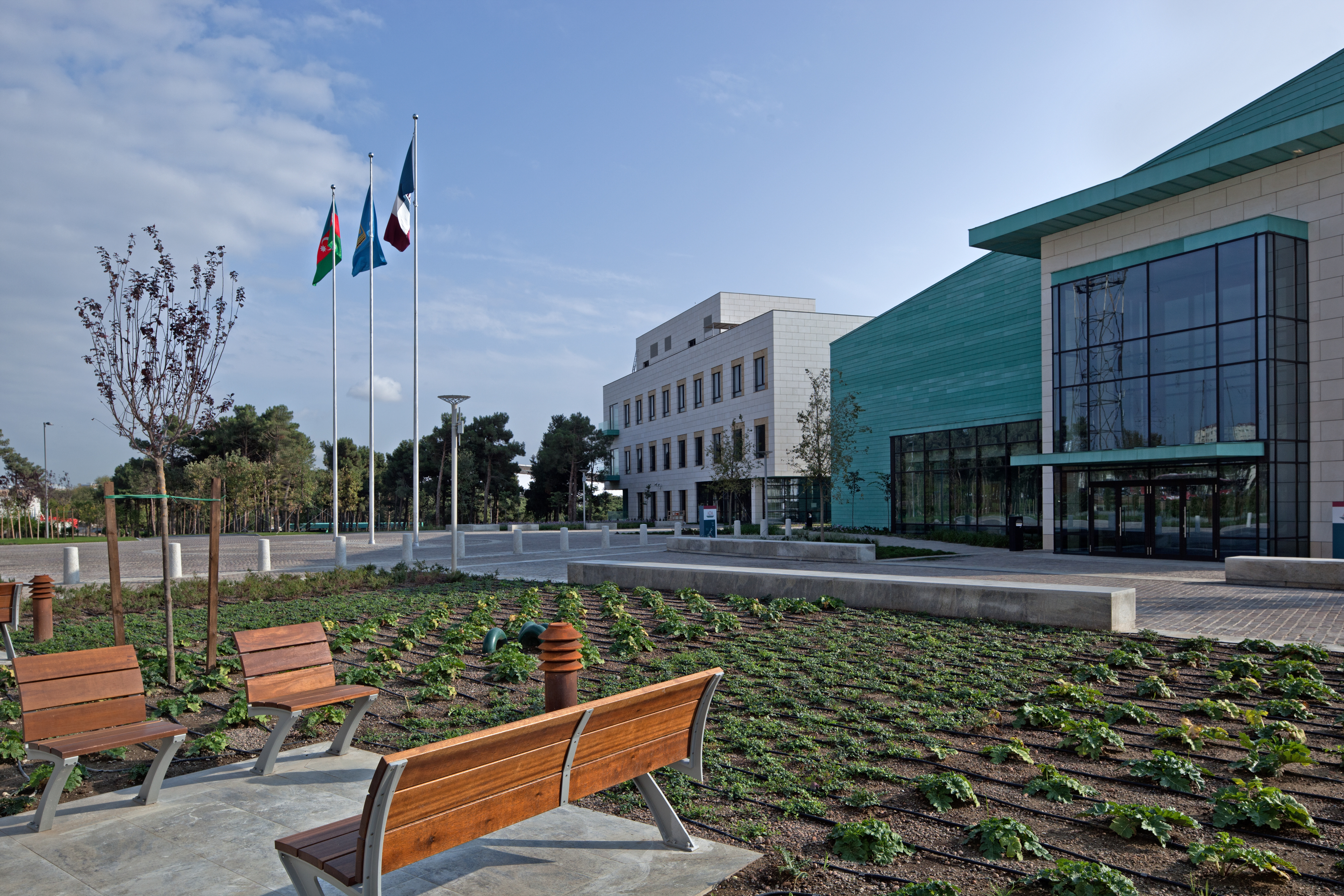
ADA University main campus

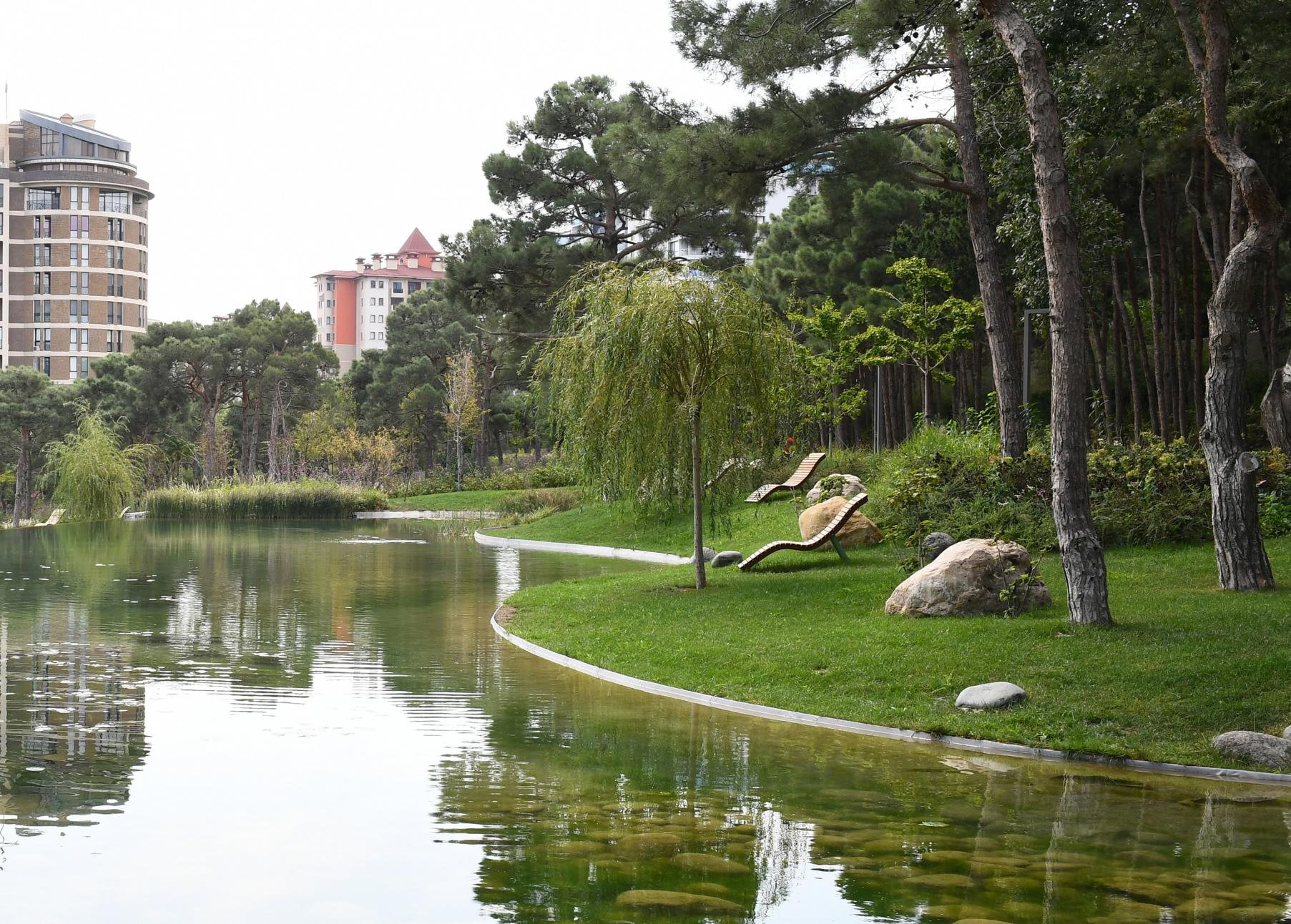
ADA Gardens

Since 2006, ADA has expanded the number of programs it offers and became a full-fledged university with seven schools.

- ADA University
  - School of Public and International Affairs
    - BA in International Studies
    - BA in Public Affairs
    - BA in Communication and Digital Media
    - MA in Diplomacy and International Affairs
    - Master of Public Administration
  - School of Business
    - BA in Business Administration
    - BS in Economics
    - BS in Finance
    - Master of Business Administration
    - MBA in Finance
    - Master in Global Politics and Management
    - MS in Human Resource Management
  - School of Education
    - MA in Educational Management
    - MA in Teaching and Learning
    - MA in Teaching and Learning (in Azerbaijani)
    - MA in Educational Management (in Azerbaijani)
  - School of Information Technologies and Engineering
    - BS in Computer Science
    - BS in Computer Engineering
    - BS in Information Technologies
    - Mathematics
    - MS in Computer Science and Data Analytics
    - MS in Electrical and Power Engineering
    - MS in Computer Engineering and High-Performance Computing
  - School of Law
    - LL.B.
    - LL.M.
  - School of Agricultural and Food Sciences
    - Agricultural Technologies
    - Food Technologies
    - Animal Sciences
    - MS in Agricultural and Food Systems Management
  - School of Design and Architecture
    - Bachelor of Architecture
    - Bachelor in Interior Design
  - College of Humanities and Sciences
    - Foundation Program
    - English for Academic and Professional Purposes (EAPP)

== Publications ==
=== Baku Dialogues ===
Baku Dialogues is an English-language quarterly peer-reviewed academic journal published by ADA University, focusing on policy perspectives related to the Silk Road region and its geopolitical, economic, and cultural significance. It was established in 2014 and revived in September 2020, serving as ADA University's flagship.

=== Azerbaijan newspaper ===
On March 4, 2025, ADA University presented the Azerbaijan newspaper (Azerbaijani: Azərbaycan qəzeti), originally published between 1918 and 1920, in Latin script. Rector Hafiz Pashayev emphasized the university's engagement with Azerbaijani history, referencing past conferences and publications on the Azerbaijan Democratic Republic's centenary.

Efforts to transliterate the Azerbaijan newspaper, which published nearly 450 issues in Arabic script, into Latin script have been undertaken on an individual basis. However, a comprehensive edition has yet to be compiled. A complete collection is planned to encompass 20 volumes, with the first two volumes, covering the period from September to November 1918, having been published.

== Honorary degrees ==
- Thomas Goltz – Famous American Analyst
- Jeffrey Sachs – Director, Center for Sustainable Development at Columbia University
- Emomali Rahmon – President, Republic of Tajikistan
- Amr Moussa – Secretary-General, Arab League
- Abdullah Gül – Former President, Türkiye
- S. Frederick Starr – Chairman, Central Asia-Caucasus Institute, Johns Hopkins University
- Anatoly Torkunov – Rector, Moscow State Institute of International Relations

== Internationalization ==
University rankings

Global – Overall
- QS World: 1201-1400 (2026)

Regional – Overall
- QS Emerging Europe and Central Asia: 301-350 (2022)

ADA University are represented with the international students and faculty from more than 40 countries including the countries in Asia, Europe, Americas and Africa. International students have the International country days, so-called Country Profile Days where they represent their country to the locals and other international students. ADA University annually holds an International Festival where the members of the international community come together in a large student fair and try their cuisines.
