= Makhmud Mamed-Guliev =

Azerbaijani diplomat and politician (born 1949)

- Mahmud Məmməd-Quliyev
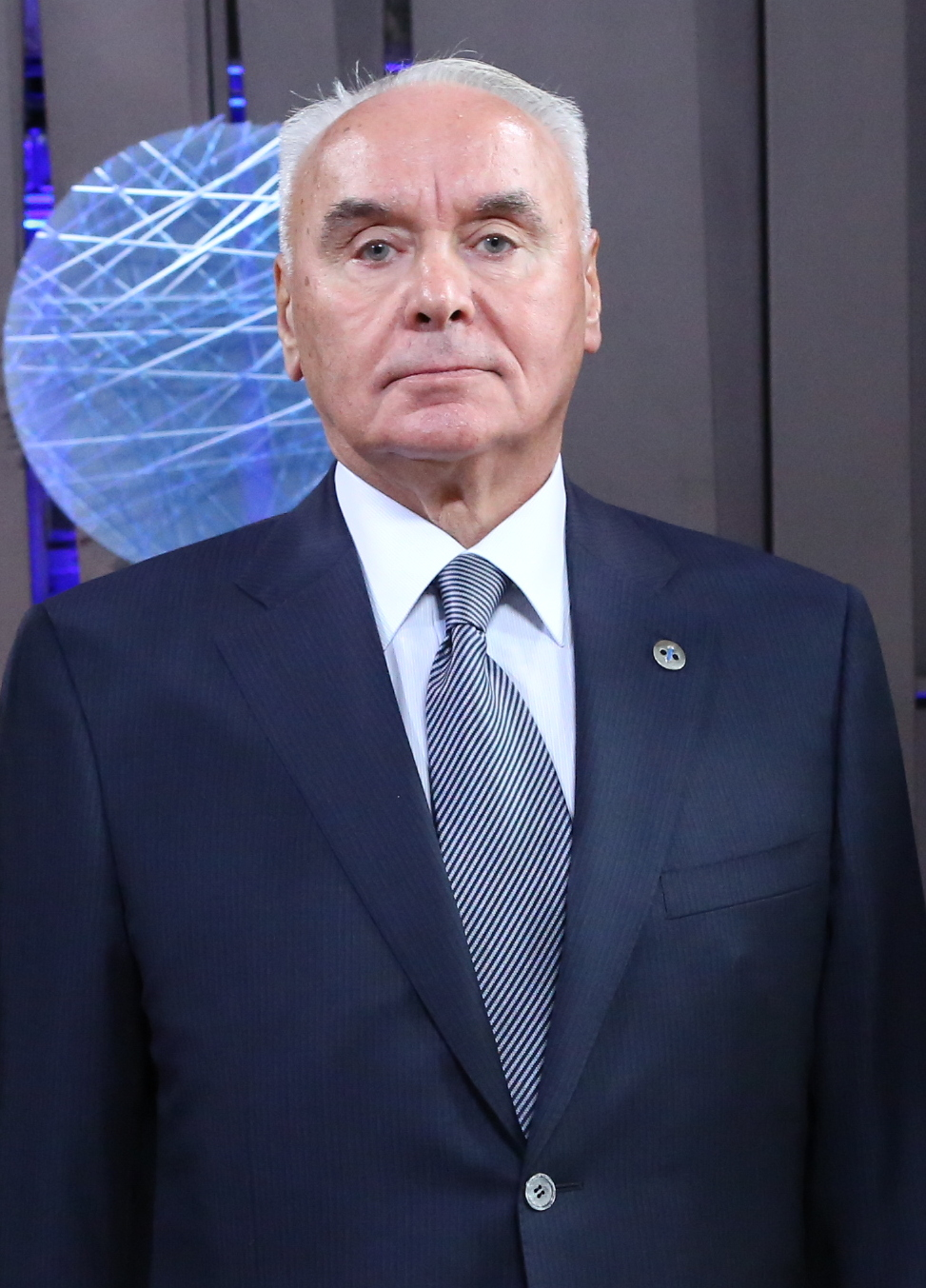

Deputy Minister of Foreign Affairs
- Incumbent
- Assumed office 14 September 1993
- President: Heydar Aliyev; Ilham Aliyev
- Prime Minister: See list: Suret Guseynov Fuad Guliev Artur Rasizade Ilkham Aliyev Artur Rasizade Novruz Mamedov Ali Asadov
- Minister: See list: Gasan Gasanov Tofik Zulfugarov Vilayat Guliev Elmar Mamedyarov Dzheykhun Bayramov

Ambassador of Azerbaijan to Denmark
- In office 25 November 1993 – 25 May 2001

Ambassador of Azerbaijan to Norway
- In office 25 November 1993 – 25 May 2001

Ambassador of Azerbaijan to Sweden
- In office 25 November 1993 – 25 May 2001

Ambassador of Azerbaijan to Ireland
- In office 25 November 1993 – 25 May 2001

Ambassador of Azerbaijan to the United Kingdom
- In office 25 November 1993 – 25 May 2001
- Preceded by: Position established
- Succeeded by: Rafael Ibragimov

Personal details
- Born: Makhmud Akhmedovich Mamed-Guliev; 15 February 1949 (age 77) Kirovabad, Azerbaijan SSR, Soviet Union (now Ganja, Azerbaijan)
- Party: Independent
- Spouse: Sevil Aliyeva
- Children: 3
- Relatives: Heydar Aliyev (father-in-law); Zarifa Aliyeva (mother-in-law)
- Education: Baku State University
- Occupation: Diplomat, politician

Makhmud Akhmedovich Mamed-Guliev (born 15 February 1949) is an Azerbaijani diplomat and politician who has been serving as the Deputy Minister of Foreign Affairs since 1993.

== Career ==
Born in Kirovabad (now Ganja) in 1949, Mamed-Guliev attended Baku State University where he studied law. Following his graduation, he worked as a lecturer there from 1972 to 1974. He then served as the chairman of the Board of Directors of the Commercial Bank from 1992 to 1993.

On 14 September 1993, Mamed-Guliev was appointed Deputy Minister of Foreign Affairs. About 2 months later, he was also appointed Ambassador of Azerbaijan to the United Kingdom, Ireland, Sweden, Norway and Denmark. He served the position until being recalled on 25 May 2001.

Mamed-Guliev also contested as an independent candidate for Nakhichevan 3rd constituency at the 1995 election, which he was elected.

== Personal life ==
Mamed-Guliev married Sevil Aliyeva, daughter of the former president Heydar Aliyev and the elder sister to the incumbent president Ilham Aliyev. They have a daughter, who frequently made phone calls to Kremlin, where Heydar was working during the Soviet era. One day, she was invited to Kremlin to have a tea with Heydar, and she went with Sevil. Despite this, Sevil later revealed that her daughter could go there without her.

He can speak Azerbaijani, Russian and English.

== Honours ==
- For Service to the Fatherland Order (2019)
