= Sevil Aliyeva =

Azerbaijani composer

- Sevil Əliyeva
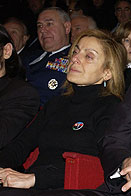
- Born: Sevil Aliyeva; 12 October 1955 (age 70); Baku, Azerbaijan SSR, Soviet Union
- Education: Academy of Sciences of the Soviet Union
- Occupation: Composer
- Spouse: Makhmud Mamed-Guliev
- Parents: Heydar Aliyev (father); Zarifa Aliyeva (mother)
- Relatives: Aliyev family

Sevil Aliyeva (born 12 October 1955) is an Azerbaijani composer and the founder of Space TV. She is the daughter to the former President of Azerbaijan Heydar Aliyev, and the elder sister to the incumbent president Ilham Aliyev.

== Early life ==
Born in Baku in 1955 to Heydar Aliyev and Zarifa Aliyeva, Sevil started to learn music when she was 6 years old. In 1982, when Heydar was appointed First Deputy Premier of the Soviet Union, the whole family, including Sevil and her younger brother, Ilham Aliyev, who was then studying at Moscow State Institute of International Relations (MGIMO), moved to Moscow.

She married Makhmud Mamed-Guliev, who has been serving as the Deputy Minister of Foreign Affairs since 1993. They have a daughter, who frequently made phone calls to Kremlin, where Heydar was working. One day, she was invited to Kremlin to have tea with Heydar, and she went with Sevil. Despite this, Sevil later revealed that her daughter could go there without her.

== Post-Soviet life ==
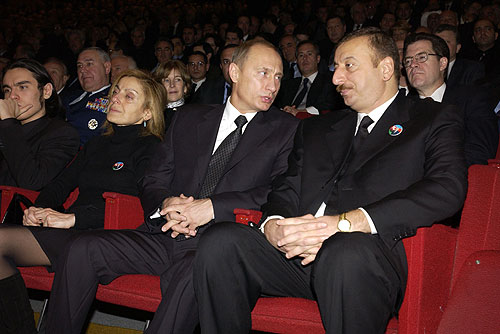
Sevil Aliyeva (second from the left at the front row) at the funeral of her father, Heydar Aliyev, 2003.

Following the 1993 coup, Heydar came to power and became the new President of Azerbaijan. Sevil, who advocated for freedom of people, was not in favour of her father's ruling style.

In 1998, Sevil left Azerbaijan and moved to London. Since then, she rarely visits Azerbaijan; one of her visits was in 2003, when Heydar died.

Following the death of Heydar, his son and Sevil's younger brother, Ilham, succeeded his presidency, although Sevil was not in favour of her brother.

In 2009, several newspapers reported that Sevil was trying to join politics, in opposition to her brother. She, however, denied the rumour.
