= Yenibağ =

Village in Azerbaijan

Coordinates: 40°48′N 46°18′E

Yenibağ (also, Yenibagh) is a village in the municipality of Garayeri in the Samukh District of Azerbaijan.
