= Shamama Alasgarova =

Soviet Azerbaijani gynecologist

- Şamama Ələsgərova
- Born: 8 March 1904; Erivan, Russian Empire
- Died: 2 April 1977 (aged 73); Baku, Azerbaijan SSR, Soviet Union
- Awards: Order of Lenin Order of the Badge of Honour
- Scientific career
- Fields: Gynaecology
- Institutions: Azerbaijan Medical University

Shamama Alasgarova (Azerbaijani: Şamama Ələsgərova; 8 March 1904 - 2 April 1977) was a Soviet Azerbaijani gynecologist. She was awarded the title of Hero of Socialist Labour in 1969.

== Life ==
Alasgarova was born on 8 March 1904 in the city of Erivan, Erivan Governorate. Her father, Mammadkarim Karbalayi Gurbanali, married Zahra Suleymanbeyova, daughter of Erivan's bey, and the couple had five children from this marriage: Tarlan, Goycek, Aziz, Shamama, and Ziyad. Shamama was the third daughter of the family. She received her early education in the gymnasium. Shamama, who entered the Azerbaijan Medical Institute for higher education, graduated from the institute in 1941 and went to the front during the Second World War. She began her career as an intern in 1941 in a military hospital. Later head of the department in the same hospital. Until 1945, she also worked in the personnel department of the People's Commissariat of Health of the Azerbaijan SSR. From 1945 to 1977, she was the chief physician of the maternity hospital No. 5 of the city of Baku, named after N. K. Krupskaya. Under Alasgarova's leadership, maternity hospital No. 5 became one of the exemplary therapeutic and preventive institutions of the republic. She conducted research on the topics of maternal and child health, as well as the treatment and prevention of gynecological diseases. She actively fought against the spread of malaria and helminthiasis in Azerbaijan.

By the Decree of the Presidium of the Supreme Soviet of the USSR dated 4 February 1969, Alasgarova was awarded the title of Hero of Socialist Labour with the Order of Lenin and the Hammer and Sickle medal for her great services in the field of protecting the health of the Soviet people. She was also awarded the title of Honored Doctor of the Azerbaijan SSR in 1960, and Badge "For Excellence in Public Health" in 1958. She was also a member of the Supreme Soviet of the Azerbaijan Soviet Socialist Republic.

She died on 2 April 1977 in the city of Baku. She was buried in the Alley of Honor.

In 1996, the maternity hospital No. 5 of the city of Baku was named after Shamama Alasgarova.

== Family ==
Shamama Alasgarova married Abdulla Ibrahimov, and the couple's only daughter, named Sona, was born in 1923. Shamama's brother, Aziz Aliyev was the father-in-law of Azerbaijan's President Heydar Aliyev, who married his daughter, Zarifa Aliyeva, and maternal grandfather of Azerbaijan's President Ilham Aliyev.

== Honours and awards ==
- Orders of Lenin
- Order of the Badge of Honour
- Hero of Socialist Labour
- Honoured Doctor of the Azerbaijan SSR
