= ADA University Library =

Library in Baku, Azerbaijan

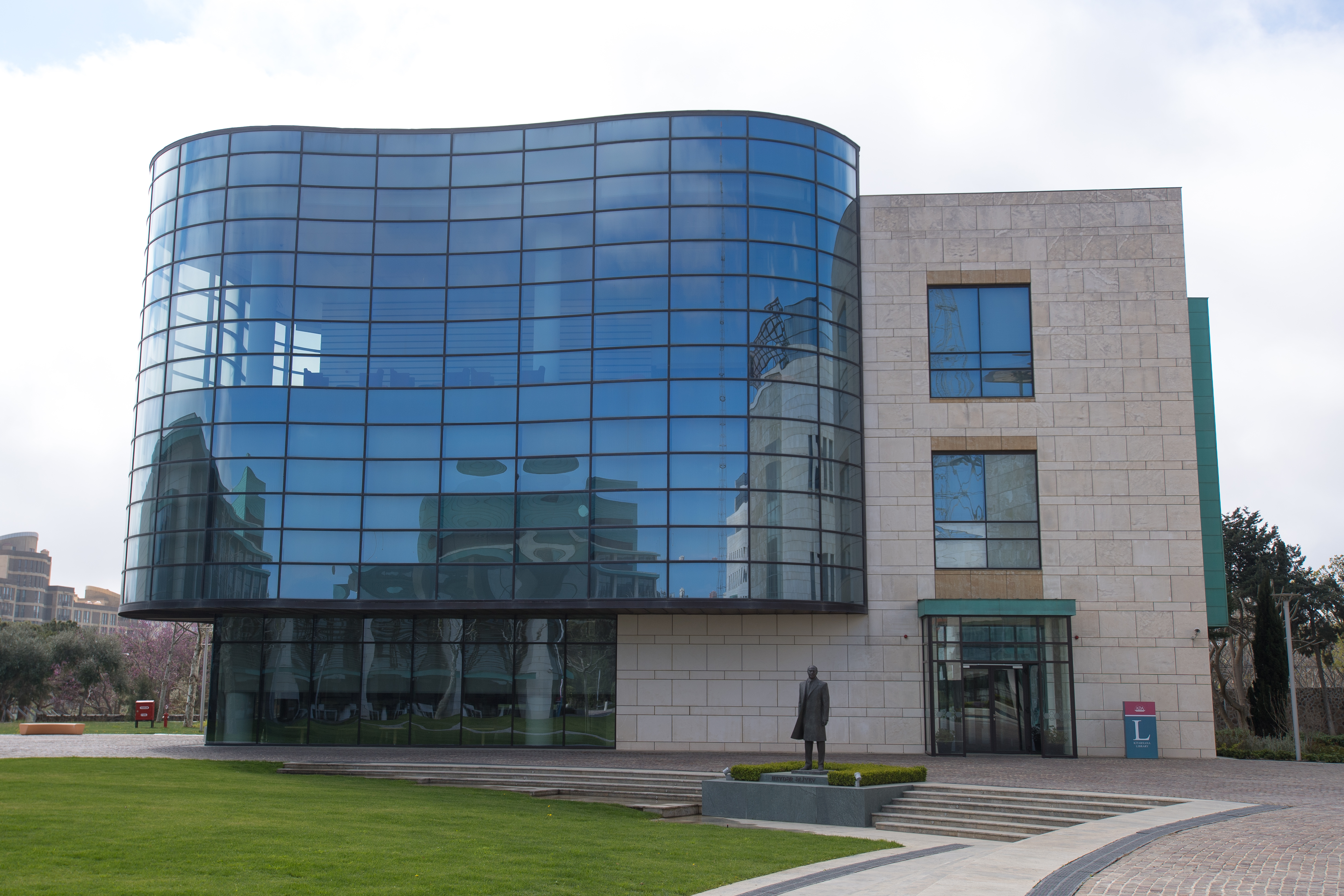
- Building of ADA University Library
- 40°23′39.33″N 49°50′57.15″E
- Location: Baku, Azerbaijan
- Established: 2012

Collection
- Size: 47,000

Other information
- Employees: 10
- Website: http://lib.ada.edu.az/

ADA University Library, a library in Baku, Azerbaijan, was established in 2012 with the opening of ADA University's new campus in the Narimanov district. Located on the university’s campus in Narimanov, Baku, the library is designed across four levels, including a basement floor (-1 level). The facility features study rooms, a coffee shop, seating areas, and computer workstations, providing a comprehensive environment for academic engagement and research activities.

== History ==
The ADA University Library was established in 2014, coinciding with the founding of ADA University. Initially designed to follow Western library standards, it aimed to support the university's academic community and foster global collaboration.

The library began with a modest collection of approximately 12,000 books and operated from a small space within the Azerbaijan Diplomatic Academy. Between 2010 and 2014, efforts to modernize library practices included adopting international cataloging systems and integrating digital resources. Librarians from local and international institutions collaborated to build a modern library infrastructure.

In 2012, the library relocated to its current facility on the ADA University campus in the Narimanov district of Baku. The new space features advanced technology and a sustainable design, providing state-of-the-art services and resources. Over the years, it expanded its physical and digital collections, focusing on subjects relevant to ADA University’s curriculum. It also implemented advanced library management systems, including OCLC’s WorldShare Management Services, to enhance global accessibility.

The ADA University Library has played a significant role in Azerbaijan’s higher education ecosystem by adopting innovative practices, fostering international partnerships, and providing a model for modern library services in the region.

=== 1st Library and Information Science Conference at ADA University ===
The inaugural International Conference on Library and Information Science was held at ADA University on April 1–2, 2014. The event focused on exploring best practices within the field of library and information science and was a significant milestone for the library community in Azerbaijan.

The conference covered a variety of topics, including modern library information services, the alignment of education and research, the digitization of libraries, and advancements in digital sciences. The event attracted international experts, such as Ms. Julie Hart, Director of Library Services at Aberystwyth University (UK), Mr. Jim Agee, General Manager of Nazarbayev University Library, and Mr. Irakli Garibashvili, Director of Tbilisi State University National Scientific Library.

This conference represented an important step toward developing a more robust and expanding information society in Azerbaijan and the wider region.

== Building and facilities ==
The ADA Library is housed in a modern, four-story building located on the ADA University campus. The library was relocated to this new facility in 2012. The architectural design of the library combines elements of Azerbaijan's rich historical heritage with contemporary artistic expressions.

The building includes two main reading areas, six seminar rooms, and various offices. It is equipped with advanced technological infrastructure to support both academic and administrative functions. The library has a seating capacity for up to 450 individuals across its reading areas.

Inside the library, a variety of spaces are designed to cater to different study needs. These include communal reading tables for group study, private study booths, and rooms for group work, all of which are available to ADA University students, faculty, and external visitors. The library’s layout and facilities aim to provide a comfortable and conducive environment for learning and research.

The ADA University Library is a key part of the university's larger commitment to sustainability, as the building was constructed with an emphasis on environmentally friendly practices and green technology.

== Partnerships and international collaboration ==
ADA University’s premier quarterly policy journal, Baku Dialogues, has been included in Columbia International Affairs Online (CIAO), establishing the university as a respected global academic partner. CIAO is the largest online repository dedicated to international politics and related academic subjects.

ADA University has expanded its global collaboration through the Library and Information Department’s participation in the Open Community Collections initiative by JSTOR. This initiative allows institutions to host and distribute digital collections through the JSTOR platform, increasing the visibility of unique primary sources. One of the first resources integrated into the JSTOR platform was the entire collection of the Azerbaijan newspaper, published from 1918 to 1920 during the Azerbaijan Democratic Republic period. This project, which involves the transliteration of the newspaper from Arabic script into modern Azerbaijani Latin, was initiated and supported by ADA University. Digital copies of these transliterated newspapers are now available on JSTOR.

In 2020, ADA University re-established its collaboration and membership with the International Federation of Library Associations and Institutions (IFLA). The university’s library is committed to global collaboration through Interlibrary Loan (ILL) and Document Delivery (DD) services, allowing ADA University members to request materials from libraries around the world. ADA University also promotes international partnerships by sharing resources from its own collections.

In early 2020, the ADA Library initiated collaboration with the Document Delivery and Resource Sharing Committee (DDRS) of IFLA. ADA University is an active member of IFLA, represented in the DDRS. In 2022, the university participated in the 17th Interlending and Document Delivery (ILDS) conference held at the Qatar National Library in Doha, Qatar. ADA University was awarded the honor of hosting the 18th IFLA ILDS conference at its Baku campus in 2024.

== Collections ==
=== Physical collections ===
The ADA Library's physical collections consist of books, periodicals, and audiovisual materials that support the academic and research needs of the university’s key schools: the School of Public and International Affairs, School of Business, School of Education, School of Information Technologies and Engineering, and School of Law. While the majority of the library’s holdings (98%) are in English, the library also offers resources in other languages, reflecting the diverse population of Azerbaijan. These include Azerbaijani, Turkish, Russian, Persian, and languages of ethnic minorities such as Jewish, Talish, Kurdish, and Lezgi.

The library holds over 47,000 physical items. Throughout its history, the ADA Library has partnered with organizations such as Blackwell, Dawson Books, Gobi, EBSCO, and F. Delbanco to enhance its collections. However, due to global economic changes after 2016, the library shifted its strategy toward more digital resources. The acquisition of print materials, especially periodicals from abroad, has decreased, while the library's collection of online databases and e-libraries has expanded significantly. The library now follows a "Just in Time" (JIT) acquisition model, responding to the needs of ADA University’s academic community.

=== Digital collections ===
From the early days of ADA University’s establishment, the integration of online academic subscriptions has been a vital part of its educational infrastructure. The ADA Library has extensive experience in providing electronic resources through partnerships with global publishers and aggregators. Initial partnerships were formed with organizations such as EBL, JSTOR, and EBSCO, and over time, the library’s collection of e-resources has grown in response to the expanding academic programs at ADA University.

The ADA Library currently provides access to more than 10 academic databases, which include full-text serials, eBooks, reports, business data, and bibliometric resources. These digital collections support the research and academic needs of the university’s community.
