= Hafiz Pashayev =

Azerbaijani diplomat (born 1941)

Hafiz Pashayev Azerbaijani: Hafiz Paşayev
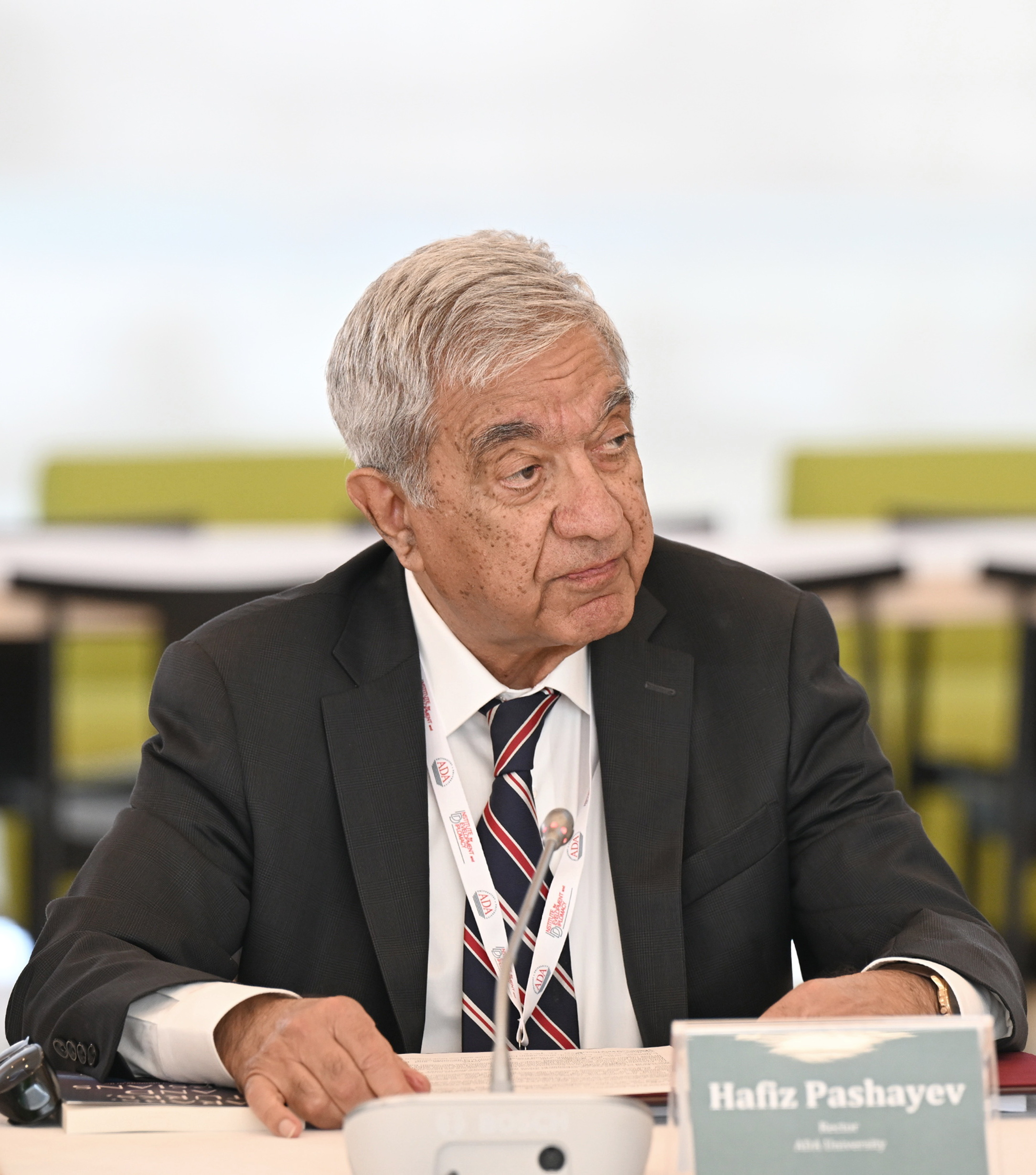
- Hafiz Pashayev in 2025

Deputy Minister of Foreign Affairs of Azerbaijan
- In office 14 August 2006 – 29 October 2019
- President: Ilham Aliyev

Ambassador of Republic of Azerbaijan to the United States
- In office November 1992 – November 2006
- Preceded by: office established
- Succeeded by: Yashar Aliyev

Personal details
- Born: 2 May 1941 (age 84) Baku, Azerbaijan SSR, Soviet Union (now Azerbaijan)

Hafiz Mir Jalal oghlu Pashayev (Azerbaijani: Hafiz Mir Cəlal oğlu Paşayev; born 2 May 1941) was the Deputy Minister of Foreign Affairs of the Republic of Azerbaijan from 2006 to 2019. He also has been the founding rector of the ADA University since 2006. He holds the Doctor of Sciences degree in Physics and was the ambassador of the Republic of Azerbaijan to the United States until 2006.

== Early life ==
Hafiz Pashayev was born in Baku, Azerbaijan on 2 May 1941. He obtained his undergraduate degree in Physics from the Azerbaijan State University in 1963. After graduation, he started to work at the Physics Institute of the Azerbaijan National Academy of Sciences until 1967. In 1971, he obtained the Candidate of Sciences degree at the I. V. Kurchatov Institute of Atomic Energy in Moscow. In 1975–1976, he continued the investigations at the University of California, Irvine. Finally, he obtained the Doctor of Sciences degree in 1984. From 1971 to 1992, Pashayev worked as a researcher and a laboratory chief at the Physics Institute of the Azerbaijan National Academy of Sciences.

== Political career ==
Hafiz Pashayev started his political career in 1993 as Azerbaijan's first Ambassador Extraordinary and Plenipotentiary to the United States (also accredited to Canada and Mexico). He kept that position until 2006, when he was appointed the Deputy Minister of Foreign Affairs of the Azerbaijan Republic. Pashayev's name is associated with the Azerbaijan Diplomatic Academy established under the Ministry of Foreign Affairs of Azerbaijan Republic. He is the founding rector of the Academy, which in 2016 received the status of university to become ADA University. Moreover, Hafiz Pashayev is the author of more than 100 scientific works and 2 monographs, as well as the articles on various socio-political issues in the local and international media. He was removed from his post and retired from the Ministry of Foreign Affairs in 2019, but continued to hold the position of the rector of the ADA University. He was awarded with the For service to the Fatherland Order second degree of Azerbaijan by the President Ilham Aliyev in July 2019, later promoted to first degree in 2021.

== Personal life ==
Hafiz Pashayev is married, he has two children and four grandchildren. He speaks fluent English and Russian. He is the son of the well-known writer and literary critic, Mir Jalal Pashayev and the uncle of the Azerbaijan's current First Lady, Mehriban Aliyeva.
