= Gazakh Teachers' Seminary =

- Qazax müəllimlər seminariyası
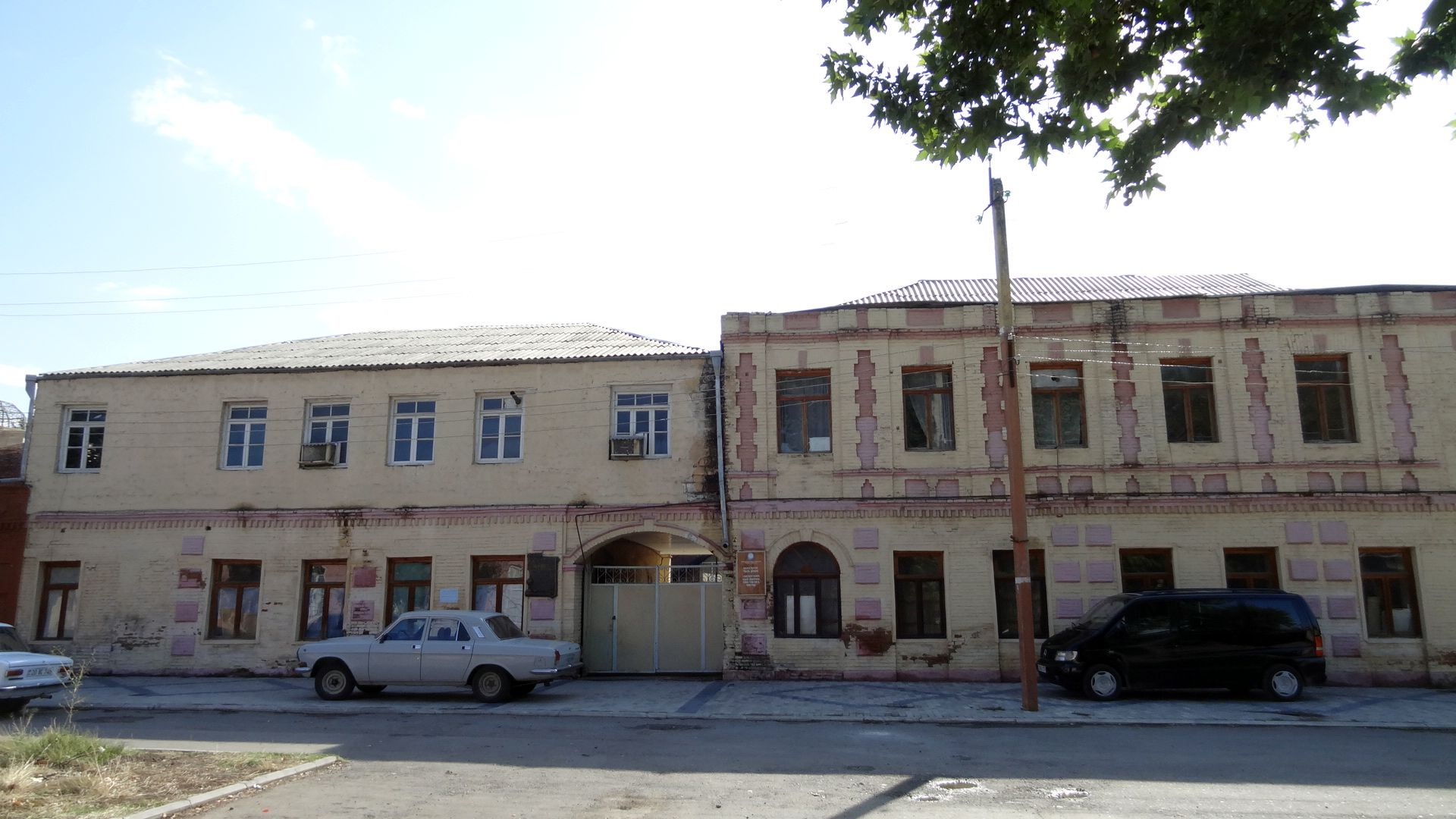
- Qazax, Qazax District; Azerbaijan

Information
- Language: Azerbaijani, Russian
- Campus: Urban

The Gazakh Teachers Seminary (Azerbaijani: Qazax müəllimlər seminariyası) is a teachers seminary that functioned from 1918 to 1959 in the Azerbaijani city of Gazakh. It was created on the initiative of the Azerbaijani enlightener Firudin-bek Kocharli and Husein Efendi Gaibov.

== History ==
In 1895, a graduate of the Transcaucasian Teachers Seminary, and the teacher of the Erivan Gymnasium, Firudin-bek Kocharli, was appointed as teacher at the Transcaucasian Teachers Seminary in Gori, where from 1910 he became the head of the Azerbaijani branch.

In early May 1918, the population of the city of Gazakh and the representatives of some rural communities of the Gazakh district filed a petition towards the educational district for the transfer of the Azerbaijani branch of the Transcaucasian Seminary from Gori to the city of Gazakh. The government has resolved this issue positively. In the same year, the Azerbaijani branch of the Transcaucasian Teachers Seminary was relocated to the city of Gazakh. Firudin-bek Kocharli was appointed the director of the Gazakh Teachers Seminary. The teaching staff of the seminary was recruited among the former graduates of the Gori Seminary.

In creating his own teachers seminary in Azerbaijan, Kocharli saw an opportunity to enroll a much larger number of children in education. Considering that time conditions of the transportation development of vehicles, not every family dared to let their son to go to Gori.

Nowadays, the building of the seminary hosts the secondary school No. 4 of the city of Gazakh.

== Famous teachers ==
- Firidun bey Kocharli - a graduate of the Transcaucasian Teachers Seminary (1885), the first director of the seminary. Along with acting as director of the seminary, he taught a course in pedagogy, the Azerbaijani language and literature.
- Mirza Mehdi Velizadeh - a graduate of the Transcaucasian Teachers Seminary (1890s), since 1 September 1919 - primary school teacher in the seminary.
- Alai-bek Shikhlinsky - a graduate of the Transcaucasian Teachers Seminary (1902), until 1924 taught mathematics at the seminary.
- Akhmed-Agha Gulmamedov - a graduate of the Transcaucasian Teachers Seminary (1902), taught at the seminary in 1918-1920 and in 1923–1927.
- Ali Huseynov is the father of Mehdi Husein, the Peoples Writer of Azerbaijan. Seminary director since 1920.

== Famous graduates ==
- Samed Vurgun - Peoples Poet of Azerbaijan. Graduated from the Seminary in 1924.
- Mehdihan Vekilov - Writer and teacher, Honoured Scientist of Azerbaijan, Deputy of the Supreme Soviet of the Azerbaijan SSR, brother of Samed Vurgun. Graduated from the Seminary in 1924.
- Osman Saryveli - Peoples Poet of Azerbaijan. Graduated from the Seminary in 1926.
- Ismayil Shykhly - Peoples Writer of Azerbaijan, Deputy of the Supreme Soviet of the Azerbaijan SSR. Graduated from the Seminary in 1936.
- Mehdi Huseyn - Peoples Writer of Azerbaijan.
- Seyfulla Shamilov - writer, publicist and interpreter, Chairman of the Writers Council of Azerbaijan.

== Gallery ==
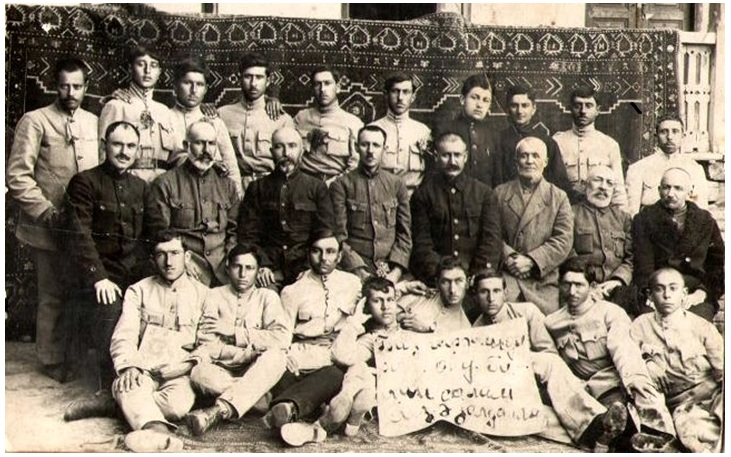
The teachers and graduates of the Gazakh Teachers Seminary in 1924:
First row, from right to left: 1st - Samed Vurgun, 2nd - Mehdihan Vekilov, 8th - Mirkasym Efendiyev.
Second row, from right to left: Akhmed-agha Gulmamedov, Suleiman-bek Gaibov, Yusif Efendiev, Ali Huseynov, Alai-bek Shikhlinsky, Mirza Mehdi Velizade, Ibrahim Gaibov, Mahmud Yolchiev.

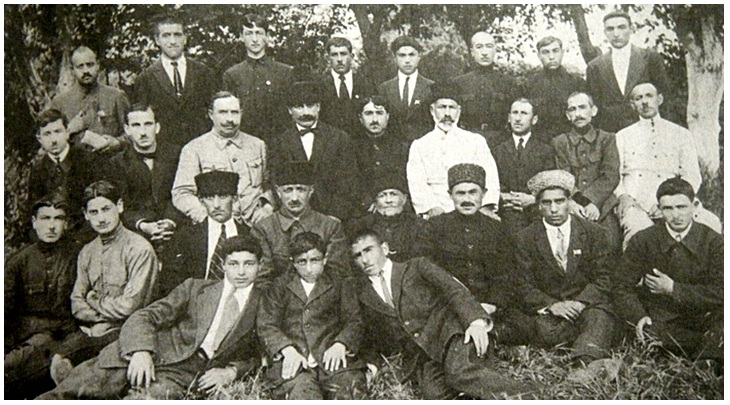
Teachers and students of the Gazakh Teachers Seminary
