= Gulara Aliyeva =

Azerbaijani musician (1933–1991)

Gulara Aliyeva Gülarə Əliyeva
- Born: 17 November 1933; Baku, Azerbaijan SSR, Soviet Union
- Died: 27 July 1991 (aged 57) Baku, Azerbaijan SSR, Soviet Union
- Genres: Classical
- Occupation: Pianist
- Instrument: Piano

Gulara Aziz gyzy Aliyeva (Note: Azerbaijani: Gülarə Əziz qızı Əliyeva; Russian: Гюляра Азиз кызы Алиева, romanized: Gyulyara Aziz kyzy Aliyeva) (17 November 1933 – 27 July 1991) was an Azerbaijani pianist.

== Life ==
Aliyeva was born on 17 November 1933 in Baku, in the family of Aziz Aliyev and Leyli Aliyeva. She got her bachelor music degree at Azerbaijan State Conservatory (now Baku Music Academy). Having graduated in 1955, Gulara started her music career at Folk instruments Ensemble named after Said Rustamov. She also began working at Folk Instruments Ensemble after Ahsan Dadashov. In 1966 she created her own instrumental ensemble Dan ulduzu which means "Dawn star". She played piano and directed this ensemble for many years.

From 1966 to 1988, she was head of the Department of Music Theory at Azerbaijan University of Culture and Arts.

In 1991, while sending her husband off to a Moscow clinic for treatment, she went out onto the balcony with her youngest daughter Nurida and the "Dan Ulduzu" ensemble cellist Minira and died as a result of the old balcony collapsing. Gulara Aliyeva was buried with her daughter Nurida in the Yasamal cemetery.
