= Qarayeri =

Garayeri
- Municipality
- Azerbaijani: Qarayeri
- Location within Azerbaijan
- Coordinates: 40°47′30″N 46°19′17″E
- Country: Azerbaijan
- District: Samukh

Population (2008)
  - Total: 5,910
- Time zone: UTC+4 (AZT)
  - Summer (DST): UTC+5 (AZT)

Qarayeri (also, Garayeri) is a village and municipality in the Samukh District of Azerbaijan. It has a population of 5,910. The municipality consists of the villages of Garayeri and Yenibagh.
