= Tamerlan Aliyev =

Azerbaijani scientist

Tamerlan Aliyev Azerbaijani: Tamerlan Əliyev
- Born: 3 October 1921; Shahtakhty, Nakhchivan, Nakhichevan Autonomous Soviet Socialist Republic, USSR
- Died: 7 April 1997 (aged 75); Baku, Azerbaijan
- Resting place: Alley of Honor
- Citizenship: Soviet Union; Azerbaijan
- Education: Azerbaijan State Medical Institute
- Known for: Doctor of Medicine
- Awards: Honored Scientist of the Azerbaijan SSR State Prize of the Azerbaijan SSR Badge of Excellence in Health of the USSR Gold medal of the Exhibition of National Economic Achievements of the USSR
- Scientific career
- Fields: medicine

Tamerlan Aziz oghlu Aliyev (Azerbaijani: Tamerlan Əziz oğlu Əliyev, 3 October 1921 — 7 April 1997) was an Honored Scientist of the Azerbaijan SSR, Doctor of Medicine, Professor.

== Biography ==
Tamerlan Aliyev was born on 3 October 1921 in Shakhtakhty village. In 1940-1944 he studied at Azerbaijan State Medical Institute. In September 1943, while still a student, he worked as an epidemiologist at Scientific Research Institute of Epidemiology and Microbiology in Baku, and in 1944 worked as an assistant at the Department of Microbiology of Azerbaijan State Medical Institute. From 1945, Tamerlan Aliyev worked first as a clinical resident, then as an assistant, associate professor, professor and head of the department at the Department of Internal Medicine of the Faculty of Facultative Therapy of Azerbaijan State Medical Institute.

Tamerlan Aliyev died on 7 April 1997, and was buried in Alley of Honor.

== Scientific career ==
In the early 1950s, he studied Azerbaijani resort factors, including Istisu and Daridag waters, and he defended his dissertation on "Characteristics of changes in the immune reactivity of animals under the influence of Naftalan oil" in 1954. According to the results of his research, Professor T.Aliyev defended his doctoral dissertation in 1969 on "Peripheral vascular status in patients with various forms of diabetes: some indicators of metabolism and blood clotting" and received the degree of Doctor of Medical Sciences. In 1970, the Supreme Attestation Commission of the USSR approved the title of professor. In the same year, Tamerlan Aliyev was elevated the position to head of the Department of Internal Medicine of the Azerbaijan State Medical Institute, and he worked in this position for 20 years.

In 1990, following the requirements of the age limit of that time, the scientist resigned from the post of the head of the department with his own request, guaranteeing that his student would be elected to that position. He worked as a professor of the department from 1990 to the end of his life.

In 1975, Professor Tamerlan Aliyev established a 90-bed endocrinology department at Baku City Clinical Hospital, and this department continues to operate today. At that time, on the initiative of Tamerlan Aliyev, for the first time in the Republic of Azerbaijan, a department of intensive cardiology assistance was established under the Department of Internal Medicine, a resuscitation and intensive care unit, a department of functional diagnostics were established. At the initiative of the scientist, for the first time in the former USSR, remote diagnostics, emergency care and intensive therapy of patients with myocardial infarction and diabetes were organized at the City Clinical Hospital No.4 in Baku, which caused a decrease in the death rate from these diseases in the country.

One of Tamerlan Aliyev's services in the healthcare of Azerbaijan was the Scientific-Research Cardiology Institute named after academician Jahangir Abdullayev of Ministry of Health of the Azerbaijan SSR, which was built on his initiative and organization. He was elected a member of the Board of All-Union Scientific Society of Endocrinologists, Cardiologists and Nephrologists in the USSR. Professor T.Aliyev's success in holding a mobile scientific session of All-Union Society of Endocrinologists in Baku in 1983 became a great historical event in Azerbaijan's healthcare.

For many years, the scientist worked as a chief therapist of Ministry of Health of the Azerbaijan SSR, chief endocrinologist of Baku City Health Department, pro-rector for scientific affairs of Azerbaijan Medical University on a voluntary basis, an advisor to the IV Head Office of Ministry of Health of the Azerbaijan SSR, was a member of the Republican Military Conscription Commission and the editorial board of "Azerbaijan Medical Journal".

T.Aliyev's monograph "Clinical-diagnostic laboratory research methods" was awarded Gold medal of the Exhibition of National Economic Achievements of the USSR and State Prize of the Azerbaijan SSR.

== Awards ==
- Honored Scientist of the Azerbaijan SSR — 1981
- State Prize of the Azerbaijan SSR
- Order of the October Revolution
- Order of the Badge of Honour
- Badge of Excellence in Health of the USSR
- Gold medal of the Exhibition of National Economic Achievements of the USSR

== See also ==
- Heydar Aliyev
