= Zarifa Aliyeva =

Azerbaijani ophthalmologist (1924–1985)

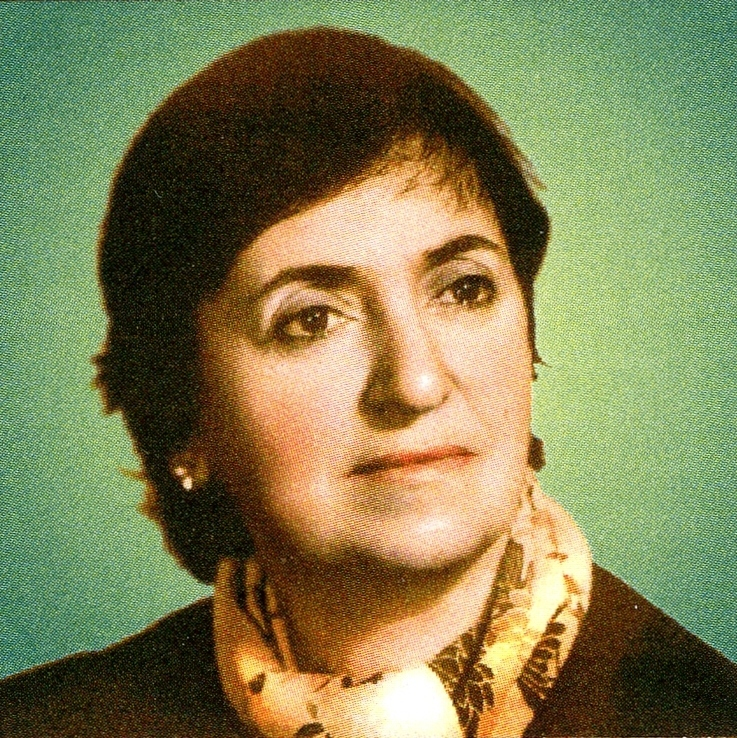
- Born: 28 April 1924; Shakhtahkty village, Azerbaijan SSR, Soviet Union
- Died: 15 April 1985 (aged 60); Moscow, Soviet Union
- Spouse: Heydar Aliyev (m. 1948)
- Children: Sevil Aliyeva; Ilham Aliyev
- Relatives: Aliyev family
- Awards: Premium named after M. I. Averbakh (1981)
- Scientific career
- Fields: Ophthalmology
- Workplaces: National Academy of Sciences of the Azerbaijan SSR
- Website: www.zarifa-aliyeva.az

Zarifa Aziz gizi Aliyeva (Azerbaijani: Zərifə Əziz qızı Əliyeva; 28 April 1924 – 15 April 1985) was an Azerbaijani ophthalmologist, academician of the National Academy of Sciences of Azerbaijan and professor.

She was the wife of the third president of Azerbaijan, Heydar Aliyev, and the mother of the fourth president of Azerbaijan, Ilham Aliyev.

== Biography ==
Zarifa Aziz was born in Shahtakhkty village, Sharur to ethnic Azerbaijani parents in 1924. Her father was Aziz Aliyev, People's Commissar of Public Health Services of the Azerbaijan SSR and later the first secretary of the Communist party's oblast committee of Dagestan. In 1948, she married Heydar Aliyev. On October 12, 1955, their daughter Sevil was born, and on December 24, 1961, their son Ilham was born. In 1982, she lived in Moscow with her family.

Much of Aliyeva's working life was spent at the Azerbaijan State Institute of Advanced Medical Studies. She devised and introduced new methods for the treatment of ocular diseases. She was the author of 14 monographs, hundreds of research papers, and 12 rationalization proposals.

== Death and legacy ==
In 1985, she died of cancer and was buried in the Novodevichy Cemetery, Moscow. Later, in 1994, her remains were reburied in the Alley of Honor, Baku.

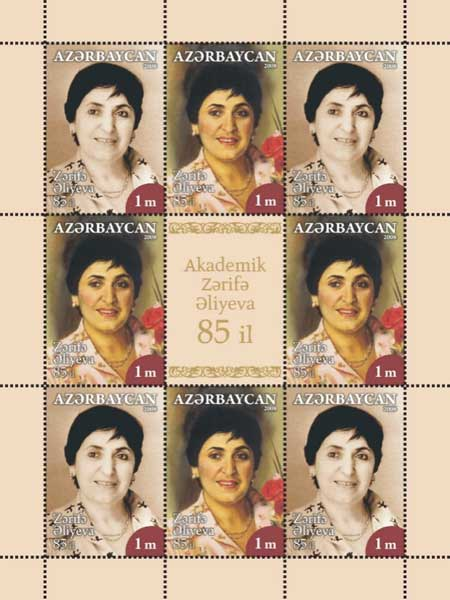
Postage stamps of Azerbaijan, 2008

Postage stamps dedicated to Zarifa Aliyeva were released in 2003, 2008, and 2013.

== Awards and honors ==
- Superior award in the sphere of ophthalmology—premium named after M. I. Averbakh- professor of medical studies.

== Selected works ==
- Anatomico-physiological features of the hydrodynamic system of the eye.
- Age-caused changes in eye and optic nerve passages: (Morfohistochemical researches) (in co-authorship). Baku, 1980.
- Professional pathology of eyesight (in co-authorship), 1988.
- Modern surgical methods in the treatment of epiphora.
- Lachrymal physiology.
- Sparing surgery in the treatment of the lacrimal passages.
