= Jalal Aliyev =

Soviet scientist, academician and politician (1928–2016)

Jalal Alireza oglu Aliyev (Azerbaijani: Cəlal Əlirza oğlu Əliyev; June 30, 1928 – January 31, 2016) was a Soviet and Azerbaijani scientist-breeder, statesman, academician, member of the Presidium of the Azerbaijan National Academy of Sciences and deputy of Milli Majlis of the Azerbaijan Republic. Born in Nakhchivan, he was the brother of the late President of Azerbaijan, Heydar Aliyev, and the uncle of the present President of Azerbaijan, Ilham Aliyev. He died in Baku in 2016.
