= Tanahat =

Tanahat Թանահատ
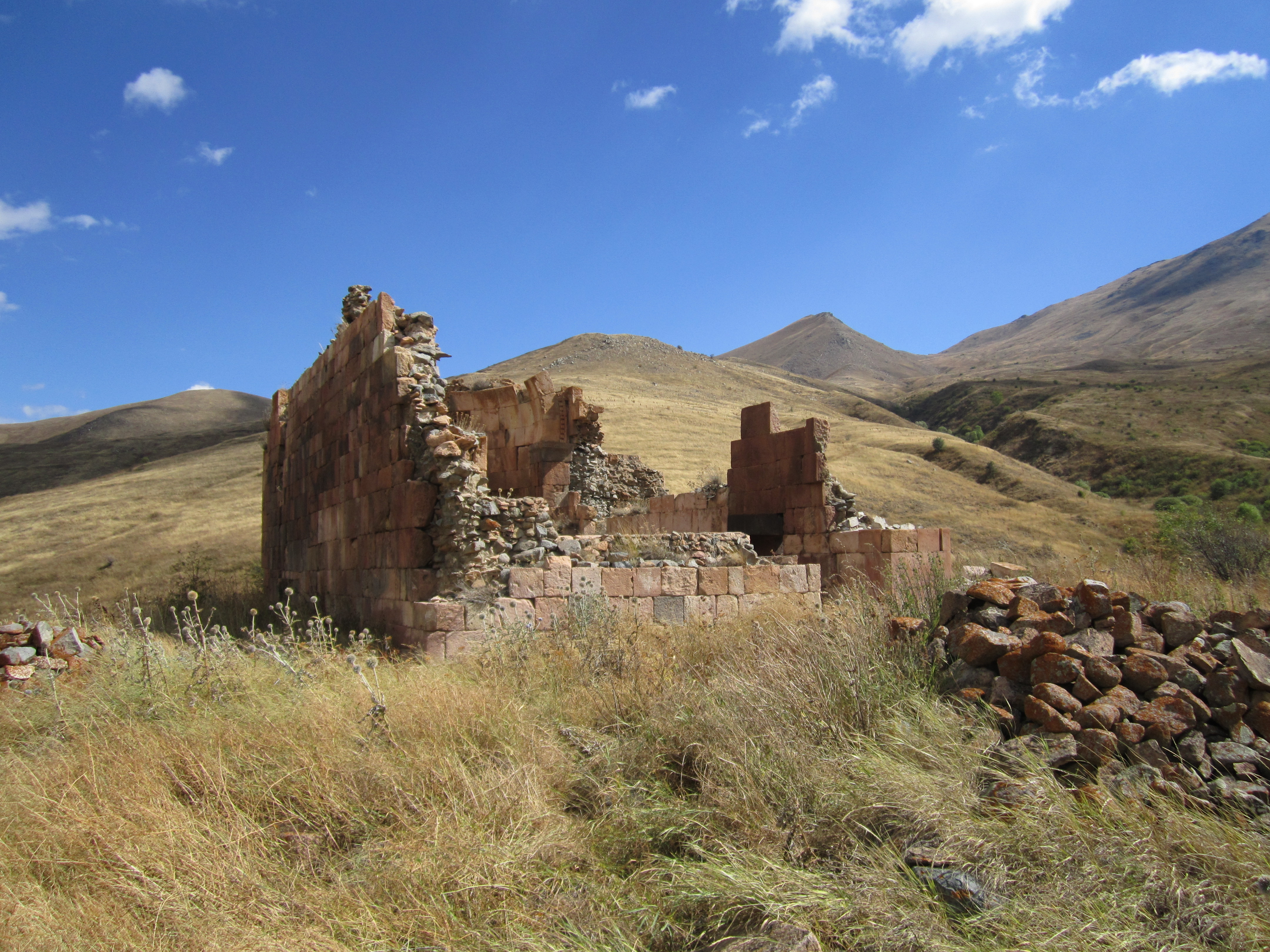

- Location within Armenia Location within Syunik Province
- Coordinates: 39°26′03″N 45°55′36″E
- Country: Armenia
- Province: Syunik
- Municipality: Sisian

Area
  - Total: 11.56 km^{2} (4.46 sq mi)

Population (2011)
  - Total: 7
  - Density: 0.61/km^{2} (1.6/sq mi)
- Time zone: UTC+4 (AMT)

Tanahat (Armenian: Թանահատ; before 1991 – Comardlı) is a village in the Sisian Municipality of the Syunik Province in Armenia.

== History ==
The village has an ancient Armenian monastery named the Tanahat Monastery.

After the collapse of the Soviet Union and Armenia's independence, its Azerbaijani inhabitants fled at the onset of the Nagorno-Karabakh conflict in 1988, and it was later resettled by Armenian refugees from Azerbaijan.

Prior to the First Nagorno-Karabakh War, Tanahat was home to 70 Azerbaijani families and had a regular bus service to Baku. President of Azerbaijan Ilham Aliyev’s grandfather was born in this village.

== Demographics ==
The Statistical Committee of Armenia reported its population as 76 in 2010, up from 42 at the 2001 census.

== Gallery ==
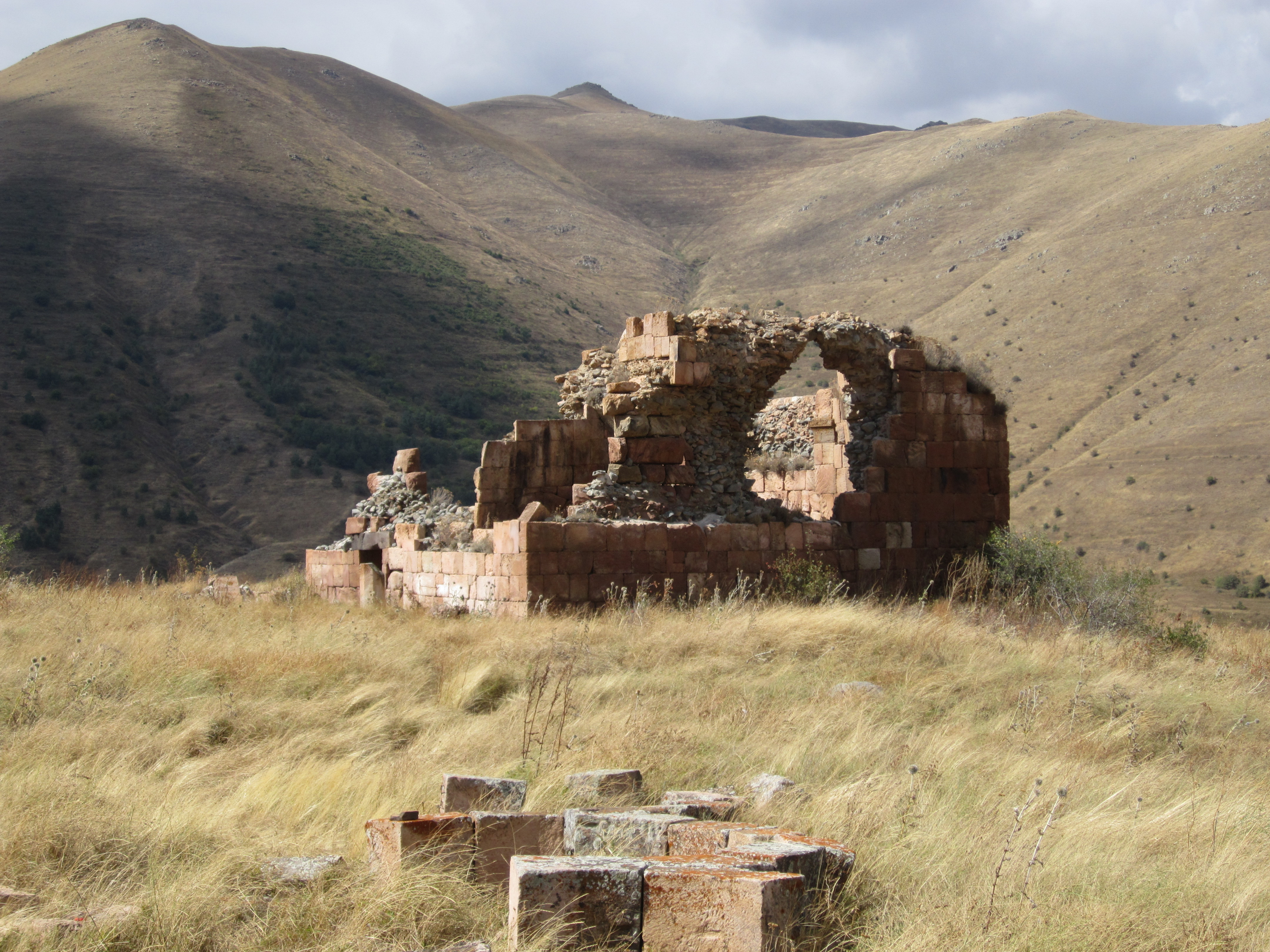

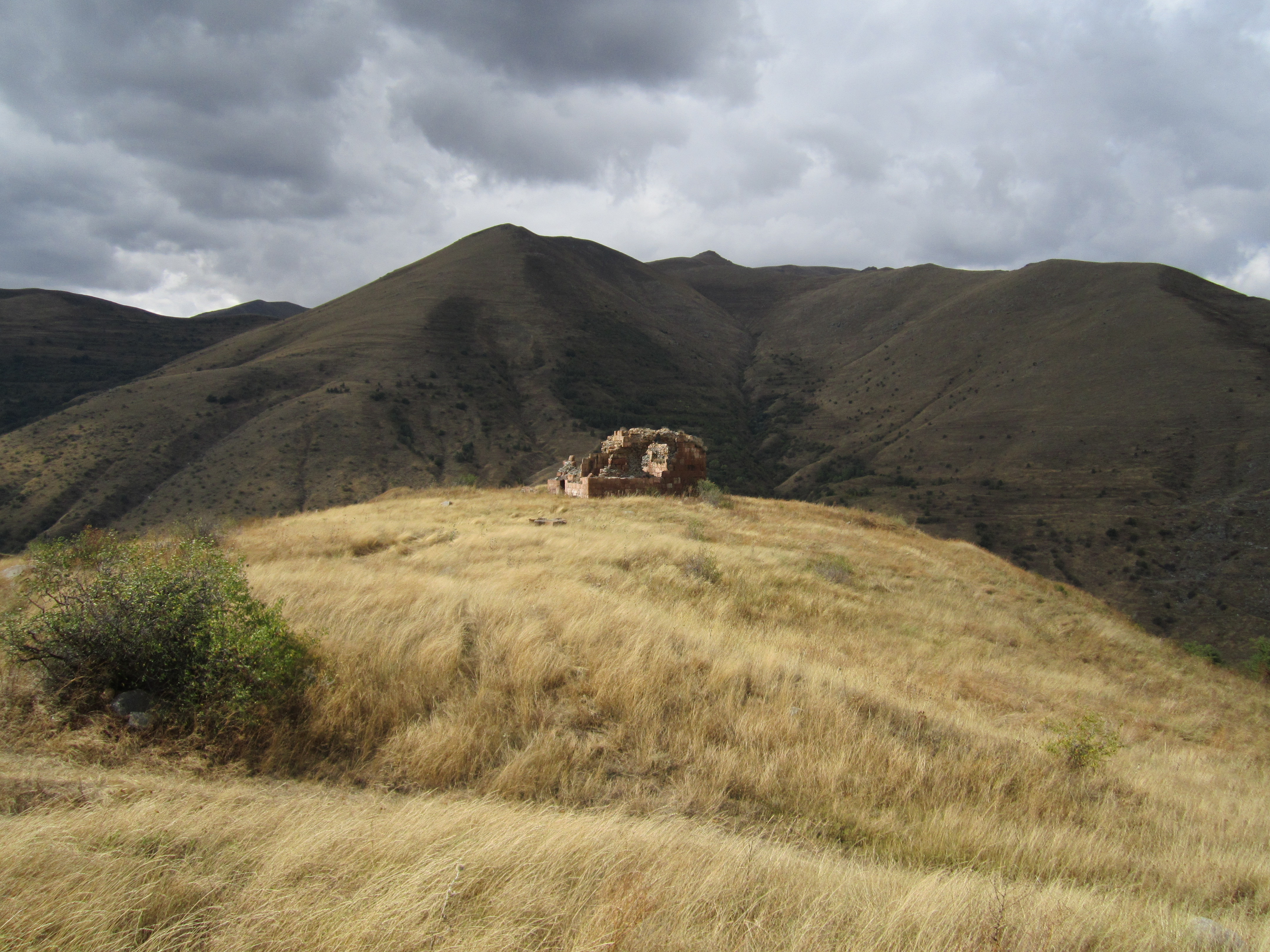

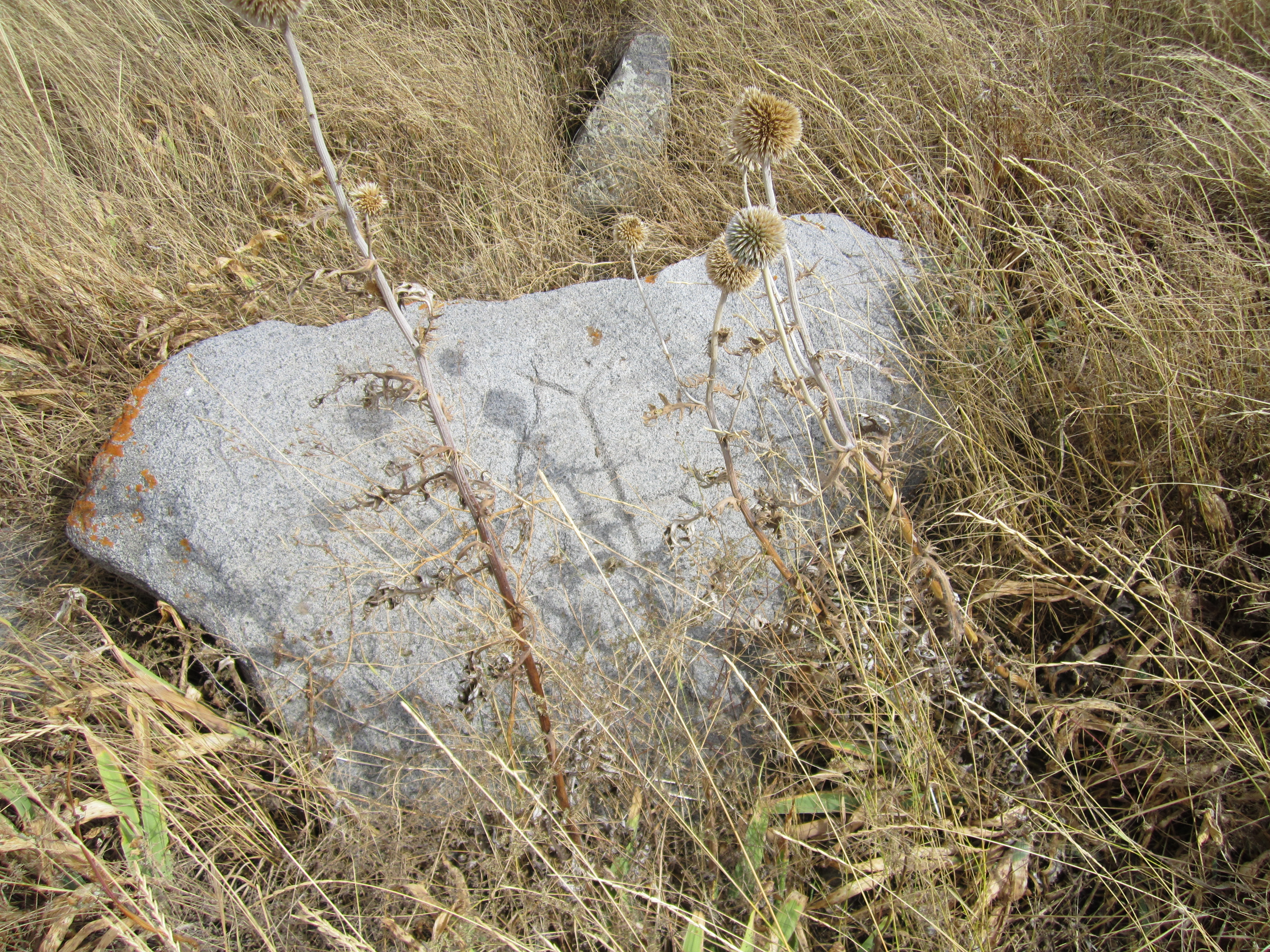

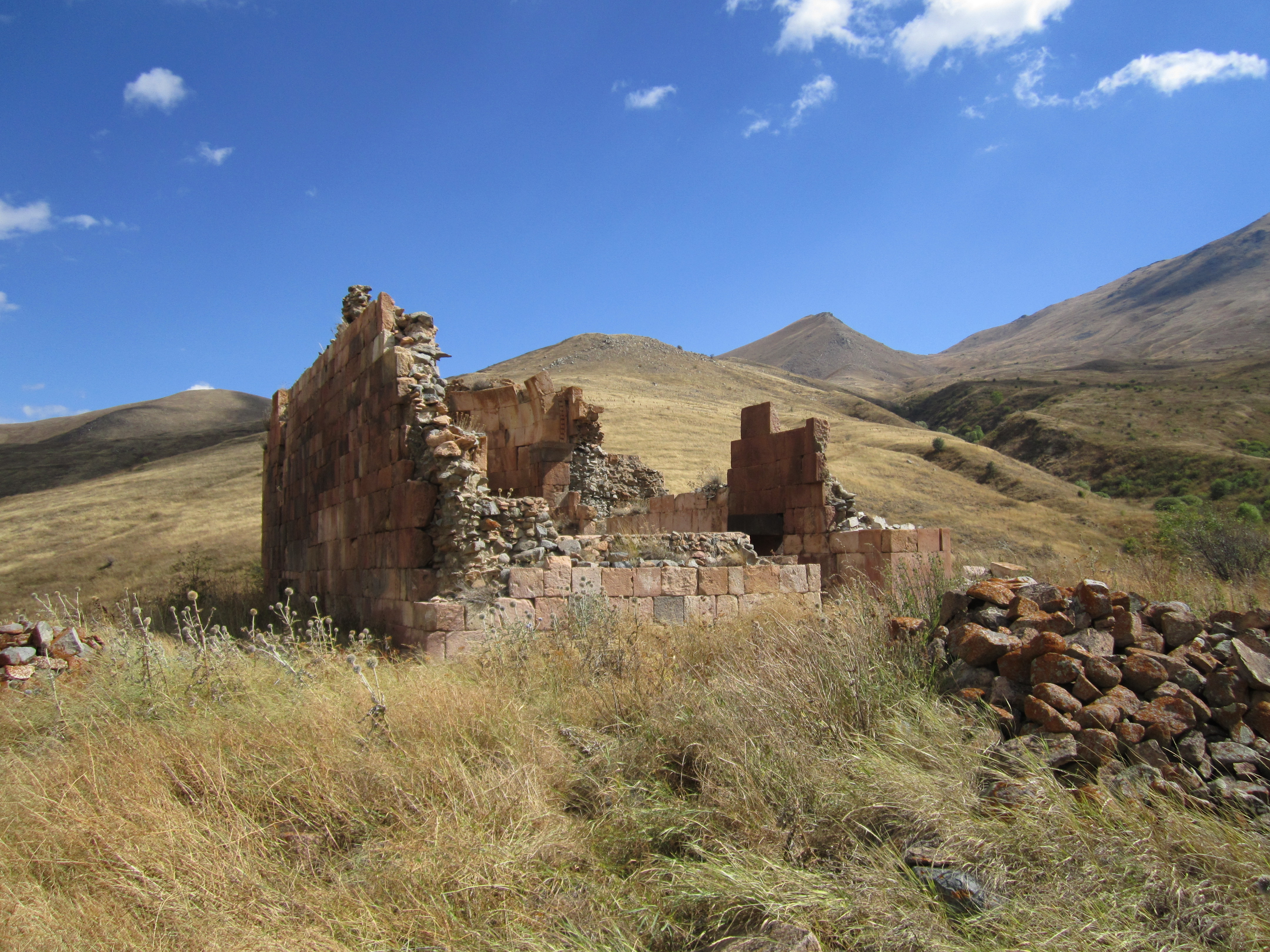

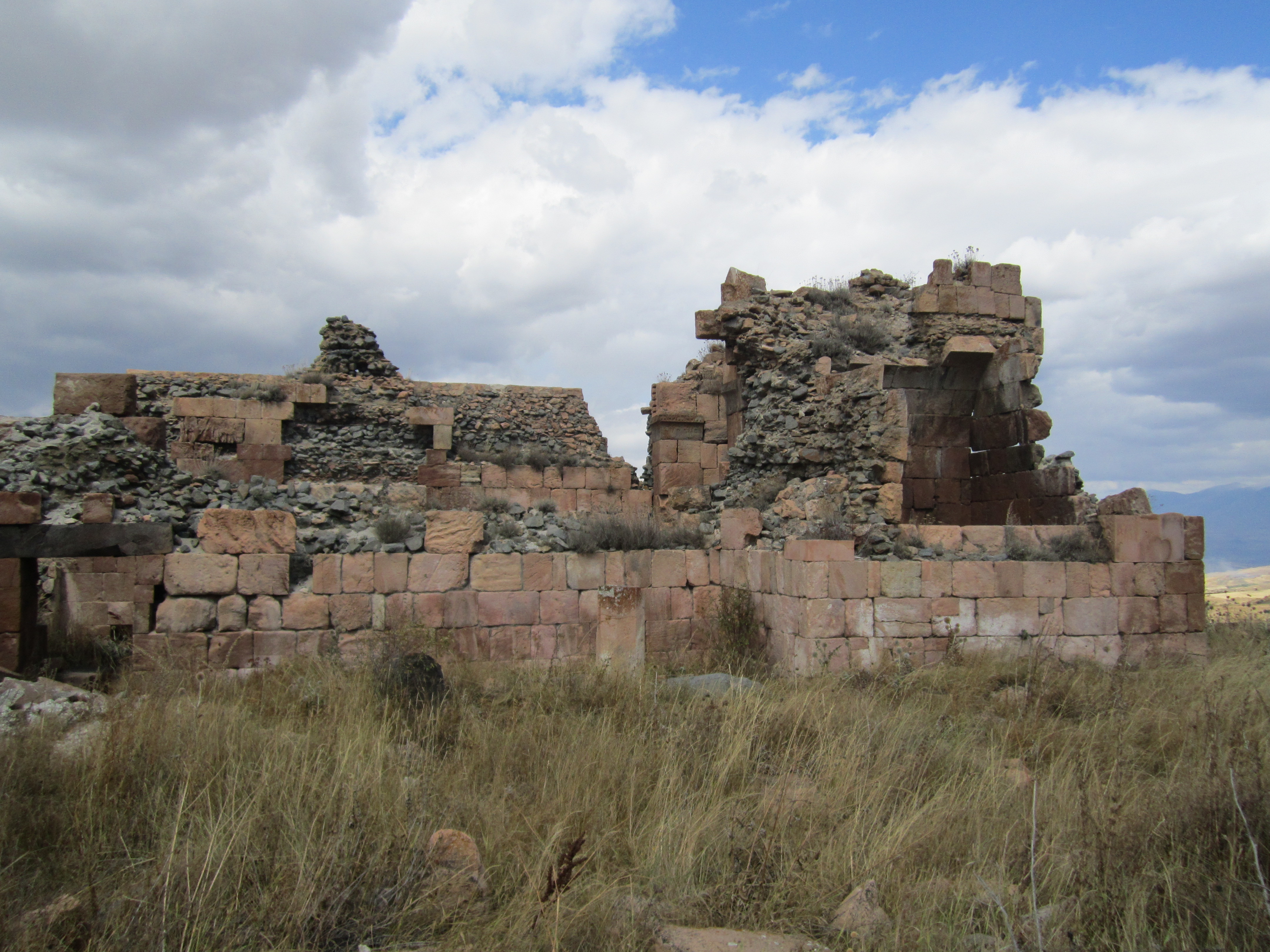

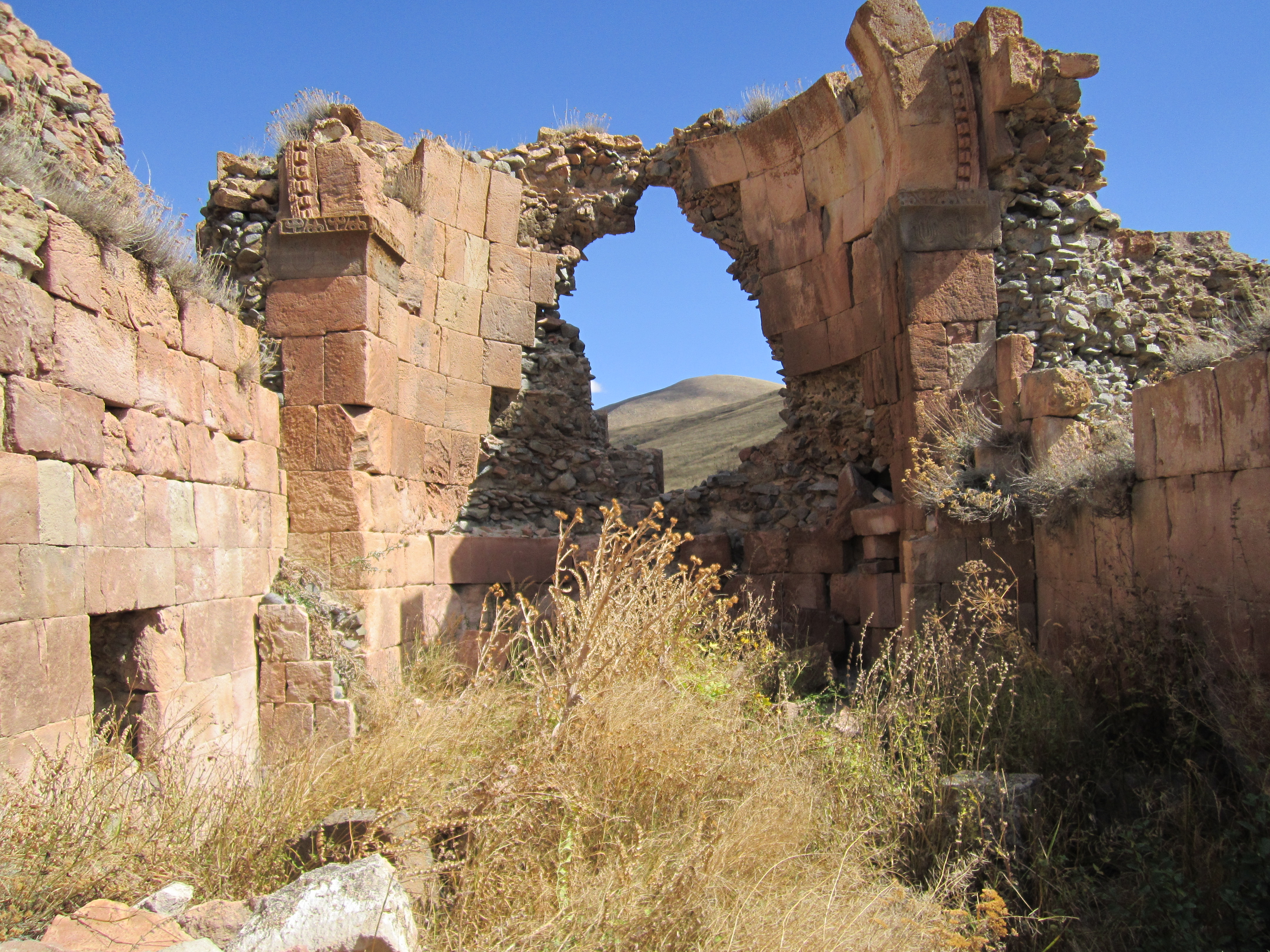

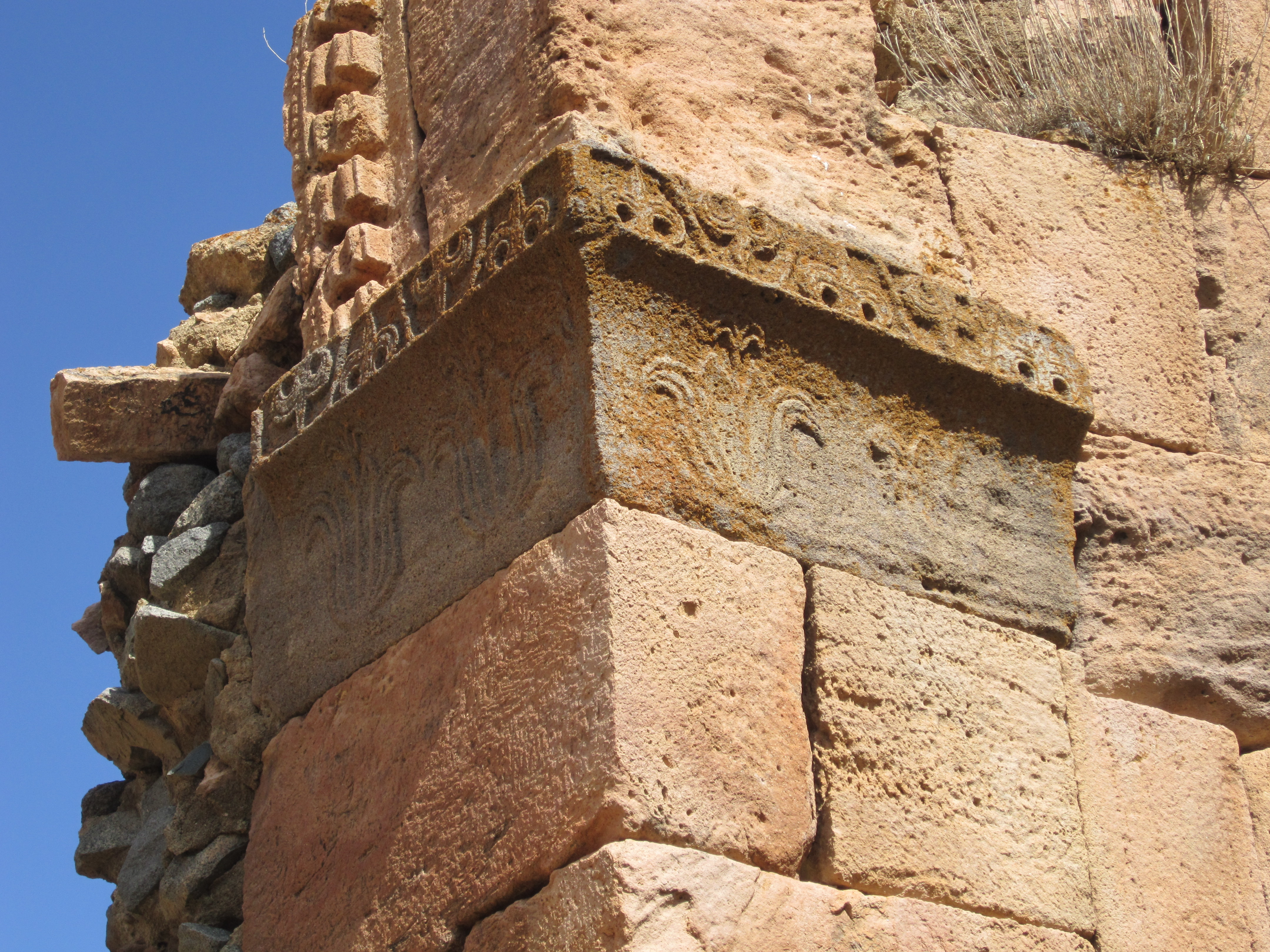

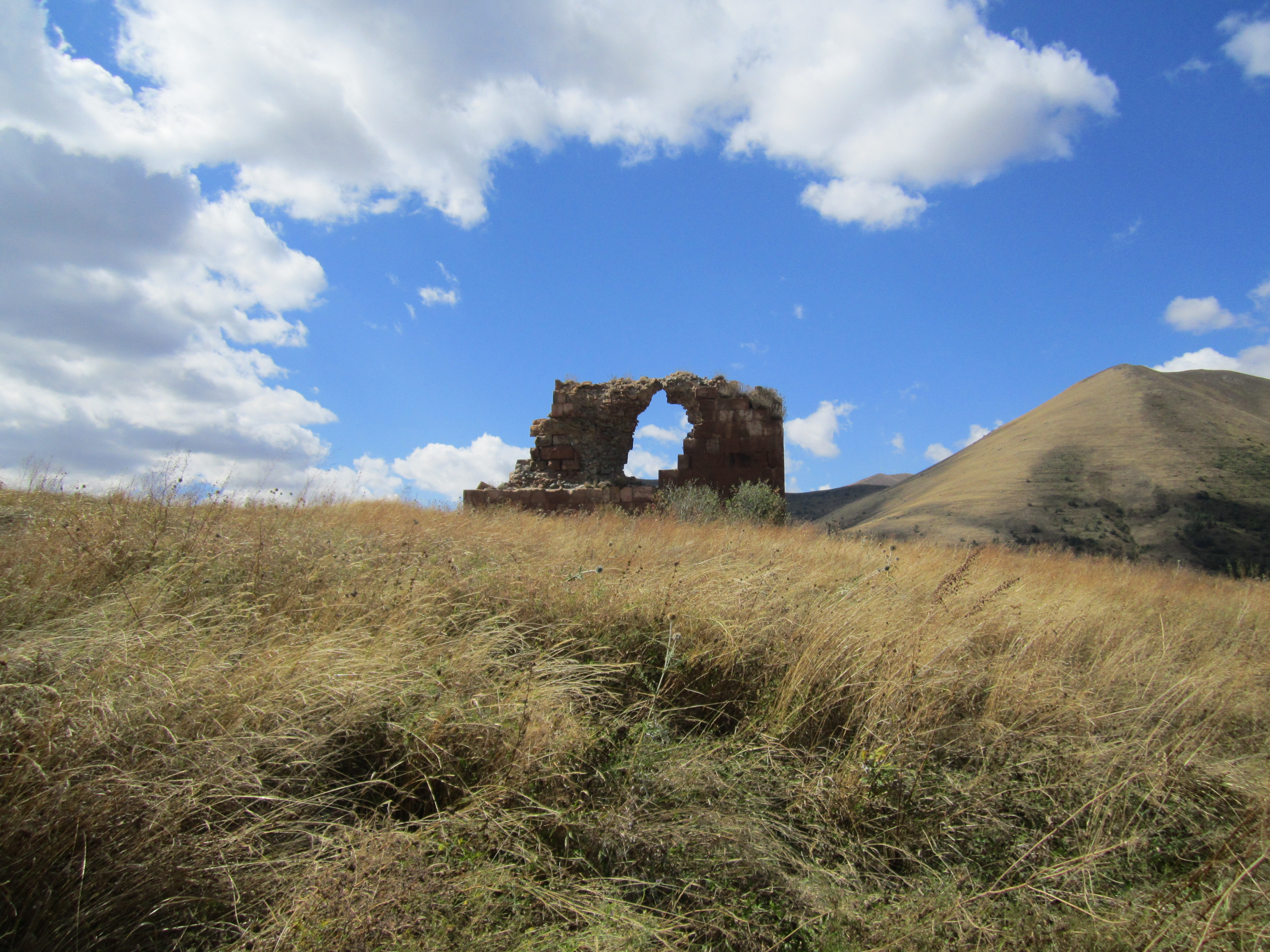
