= Healthcare in Azerbaijan =

Healthcare in Azerbaijan is provided by public and private healthcare institutions and regulated through the Ministry of Healthcare.

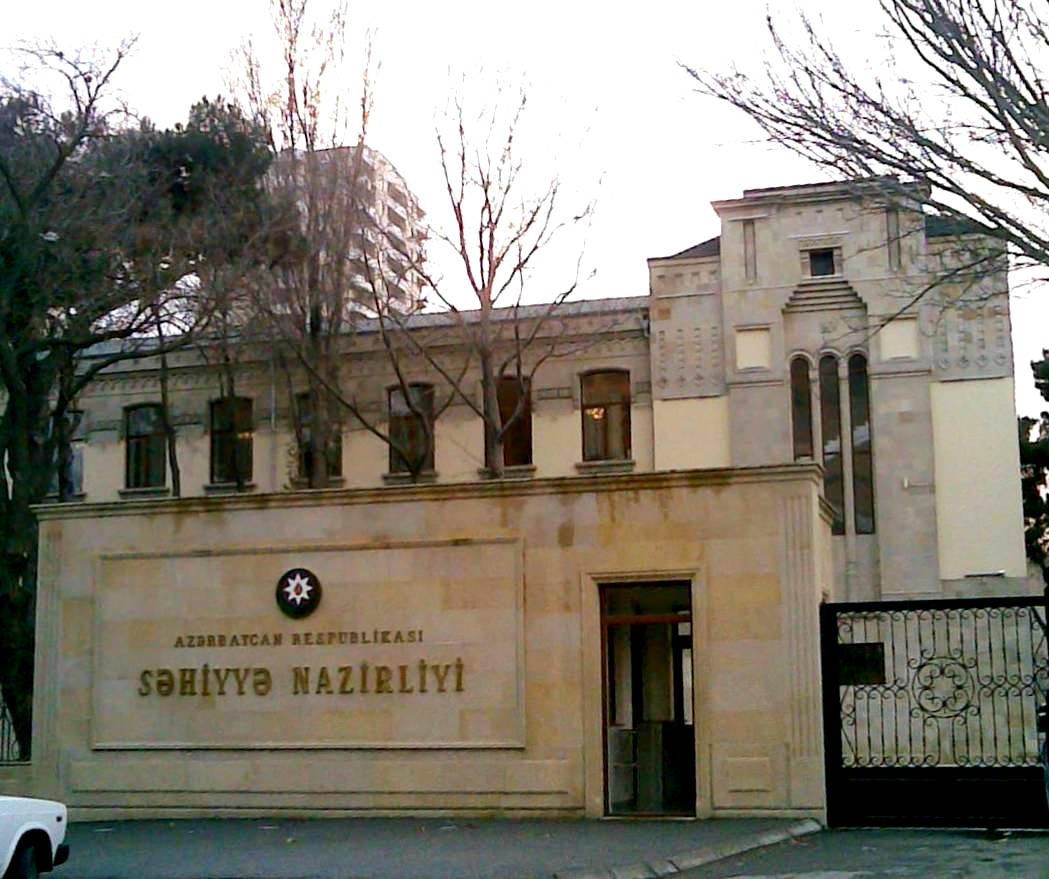
Ministry of Healthcare

== Historical introduction ==
=== ADR period ===
The Ministry of Healthcare was established on 17 June 1918, according to the decree of Council of Ministers of Azerbaijan Democratic Republic. The surgeon Khudadat Rafibeyli was appointed as the first minister who graduated Medical faculty of Kharkhov University. The government developed a comprehensive plan to improve state-provided medical services for residents, open new medical centers, construct medical warehouses and laboratory buildings, besides necessary equipment was acquired by the order of the Ministry.

Government tried to improve fighting against epidemics, upgrade the medical service in regions with providing medical staff and medication. More than 30 hospitals were operating in regions during the ADR. Outpatient services were provided free of charge in the villages. The main tasks of the existing rural hospitals and medical stations were the hospitalization of infectious patients and neutralization of the disease areas. Taking into account the insufficiency, as there was only a doctor for 75 thousand residents, Parliament decided on opening 35 new hospitals and 56 medical assistant points and providing 43 billion manats for that in order to expand hospital network in rural areas.

State pharmacies and an analytical laboratory were set up in Baku to make drugs, bacteriological preparations, treatment syrups, and to conduct medical-legal examinations. A central warehouse was established to provide healthcare service with medicines and medical supplies properly and timely. The Government of the Republic provided grants for medical students to study abroad.

=== Soviet period ===
After ADR collapsed and Azerbaijan became a part of Soviet Union, health system started to develop as a part of Soviet healthcare. Newly formed People's Commissariat of Healthcare of Azerbaijan by Soviet authorities benefited from the traditions established during the ADR period. The main task of the Commissariat was to fight against infectious diseases such as plague, chickenpox, malaria, and measles. Mohsun Gadirli was appointed as a healthcare commissar (healthcare minister) to carry out reforms in this area in November 1921. During his term a unified healthcare system was created, special attention was paid to personnel training, improvement of health service in rural areas, improvement of drug supply of the population, development of medical services for women and children. Hospitals, outpatient clinics, pharmacies and other medical institutions were established in the centers of different regions and in larger settlements. Implementing the decrees on nationalization of drugstores, distribution of free food for children, and free medical care for the population was started.

Considering the need for medical staff and specialized scientific-research institutions in various fields of medicine, People's Health Commissar of Azerbaijan Mohsun Gadirli launched a sanitary-epidemiological organization under the supervision of A.Alibeyov, the state sanitary-epidemiology inspector. Later on Scientific-Research Center of Virology, Microbiology and Hygiene was established based on previous organization. In 1923 the Institute of Skin and Venereal diseases in Baku, and in 1926 Central Skin and Venereal Dispensary was established.

In 1927 the Institution of Mother and Child Protection, in 1931 The Institution of Medical Parasitology and Tropical Diseases, in 1935 the Institution of Resorts and Physiotherapy, and in 1941 the Institution of Roentgenology, Radiology and Oncology were opened. After the World War 2 rehabilitation of the disabled war veterans were one of the top issues for the state authorities. The Scientific Research Institute of Orthopedics and Reproductive Surgery was established in 1946 for that purpose.

In 1960-70s a number of healthcare facilities including Urology Hospital, Diagnostic Center, Neurosurgical Center, Toxicology Center, Family Planning Center were established within a short period of time; construction of new building for National Center of Oncology and new complex for the Scientific-Research Institution of Ophthalmology was started.

The context for the healthcare system in Azerbaijan Republic inherited Soviet Semashko model, which was a tax-based system with its highly centralized planning of resources and personnel based on a hierarchical structure. Soviet health system was owned by the state, planned and managed centrally. All healthcare personnel were employed by the state, and private practice was not allowed.

== Current healthcare system ==
After independence in 1991 the healthcare system of Azerbaijan confronted economic difficulties and therefore, quality and access to medical service declined. The traditions inherited from Semashko model still remain in health structure of the country. Government is trying to address the problems faced by healthcare sphere of the country with implementing different reforms, projects and getting support from international organizations. Healthcare system in Azerbaijan has been improving in recent years with the support of World Bank. New medical establishments are constructed, upgraded medical equipment is provided and medical staff is trained in the framework of the projects.

=== Public healthcare ===
However, there are significant improvements in healthcare system; Azerbaijani society suffers from inefficient and underfunded public healthcare. Public hospitals are run by the state and medical care is offered free of charge for Azerbaijani residents. Pediatric and adult polyclinics offering outpatient services and specialized clinics/hospitals offering inpatient services are the public facilities. These establishments are mostly located in Baku.

=== Private healthcare ===
Private healthcare in Azerbaijan experienced enlargement recently.

=== Health tourism ===
Azerbaijan is a target of health tourists from Iran, Turkey, Georgia and Russia. The Bona Dea International Hospital in Baku was built in 2018 to attract international custom, and has staff from various European countries.

=== Pharmacies ===
A number of pharmacies (aptek) are operating in the main cities of the country, especially in Baku most of them are open 24/7.

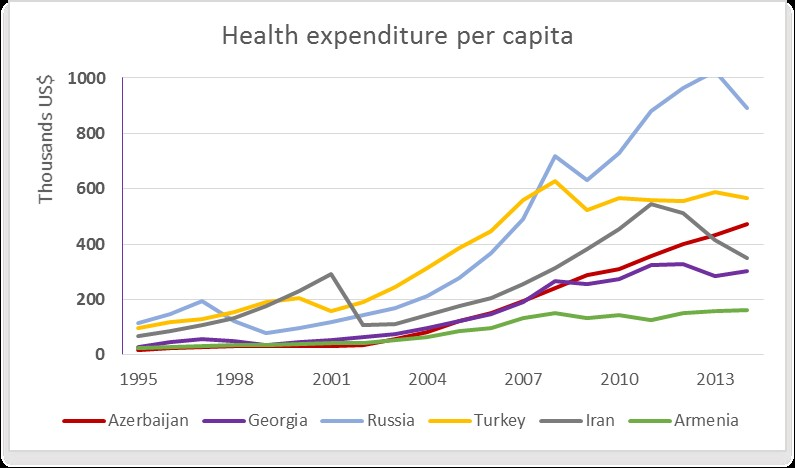
Health expenditure per capita in Azerbaijan between 1995-2014 in comparison with neighboring countries Data from World Bank

== Organizational structure ==
It was one of the main functions of the state to ensure the health care for the population which was mentioned in the 1995 Constitution. The healthcare system is mainly divided between Ministry of Healthcare and local authorities. Central institutions, a number of facilities including republican hospitals, research institutes and sanitary epidemiology system belong to the Ministry. Local hospitals, district polyclinics and specialized dispensaries are owned by district and city administrations.

Other ministries also manage health services in addition to their main service, such as Ministries of Transport, Defense, Customs with the hospitals of Railway, Defense and Customs respectively. The Medical University was also under the responsibility of Ministry of healthcare, but after a few years of gaining independence, it was granted autonomy.

The current Statute of the Ministry of Health of the Republic of Azerbaijan is confirmed by a decree signed by Heydar Aliyev on 29 December 1998.

For the beginning of 2017 there are 569 hospitals, 1758 ambulatory-polyclinics, 32.2 thousand physicians in the country.

== Healthcare reforms ==
The Governmental Commission was established to organize and conduct health care reforms according to the Resolution No 760 (13 March 1998) of the President of the Republic of Azerbaijan. It includes the ministers of economy, finance, justice ministries, heads of National Bank, Social Protection Fund, Trade Unions Confederation, State Insurance Supervision Service, responsible employees of the Cabinet of Ministers of the Republic of Azerbaijan.

By the Decree of the President of the Republic of Azerbaijan No. 49 (29 December 1998) "The Statue of State Commission for Healthcare Reforms in the Republic of Azerbaijan" was approved. The government of Azerbaijan has been accepted laws on: "Pharmaceutical activity" (5 November 1996); "Protecting of population health" (26 June 1997); "Radiation safety of the population" (10 December 1997); "Transplantation of human organ and (or) tissues" (28 October 1999); "Medical insurance" (28 October 1999); "Private medical practice" (30 December 1999); "Immunoprophylaxis of infectious diseases" (14 April 2000); "Control tuberculosis in the Republic of Azerbaijan" (2 May 2000); "Psychiatric care" (12 June 2001); "Narcological service and control" (29 June 2001); "Iodization of salt for mass prevention of iodine deficiency" (27 December 2001); "State care for people with diabetes" (23 December 2003); "Turnover of narcotics, psychotropic substances and their precursors" (28 June 2005); "Pharmaceutical products" (22 December 2006); "Fight against the disease caused by human immunodeficiency virus" (11 May 2010); Amendments to the Law of the Republic of Azerbaijan "On protecting of population health" (22 October 2013, 24 June 2011); "State care of multiple sclerosis" (7 March 2012); "Mandatory child dispensing" (5 May 2013).

== Healthcare projects ==
After gaining independence, the healthcare system in Azerbaijan faced with challenges because of ongoing war and economic downturn. International organizations (USAID, UNICEF, WHO, World Bank) started to help Azerbaijan in the field of healthcare. Heydar Aliyev Foundation is also initiating projects to support healthcare. Those projects are dealing with diabetic, thalassemia patients and their treatments, organizing blood donation, improving health condition of mothers and their babies.

Projects for applying modern information technologies to the healthcare system were implemented as "Electronic Azerbaijan" State Program. "Electronic health card of citizens" system was launched in the framework of this program.

Despite all these developments, healthcare system in Azerbaijan still requires attention, and there are some important issues to be solved. For that reason, major challenges facing healthcare sector are highlighted in "Azerbaijan: View at future" Development Conception approved by the Decree of the President of Azerbaijan.

=== International relations in healthcare ===
==== USAID ====
- Primary Healthcare Services Development Project
- Reproductive Wellbeing and Family Medicine Project
- Demographic and Health Summary in Azerbaijan Project
- The Struggle Against The Measles and German measles Project
- Development of First Aid Project
- Rescue of Children Project

==== UNICEF ====
- Rescue of Children project
- Reproductive Wellbeing and Family Medicine Project
- Demographic and Health Summary in Azerbaijan Project
- Strengthening medical services in the regions of Azerbaijan
- Statistics on the child mortality under the age of 5

==== WHO ====
- Public Health Policy Project
- Determination of the new ICD 10 nozzle codes
- Struggle against tobacco project
- Struggle with Tuberculosis Project
- Malaria Project
- AIDS project

==== World Bank ====
- Reforms in Healthcare Educational Innovation Project
- PHRD Project for Reforms in the Public health system

== Health insurance ==
Law on Medical Insurance (1999) was not widely implemented in the country and employees were rarely subjected to compulsory medical insurance, so different actions were carried out to fill the gaps in health insurance. One of them was establishment The State Agency on Mandatory Health Insurance under the Cabinet of Ministers of the Republic of Azerbaijan according to the Order No. 2592 dated 27 December 2007 by the President of Azerbaijan. Regulation and structure of the Agency was approved by the President of Azerbaijan according to the Decree No. 765 (15 February 2016). Therefore, new system will provide health insurance fund for pensioners, non-working citizens and those receiving social benefits financed by the state.

Azerbaijan introduced pilot compulsory health insurance project according to the Decree (2016 November 29) of the President of Azerbaijan on "Measures for ensuring implementation activities of mandatory health insurance pilot project in Mingachavir and Yevlakh. It is also planned to implement mandatory health insurance throughout the country in the future.

== See also ==
- Medicine in Azerbaijan
- Ministry of Healthcare of Azerbaijan
- Azerbaijan State Medical University
