= Ogtay Shiraliyev =

Azerbaijani politician and professor (1950–2025)

- Oqtay Şirəliyev
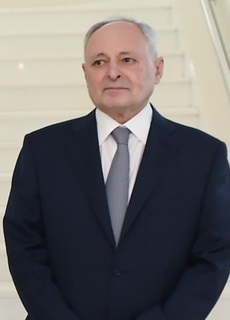
- Shiraliyev in 2017

Minister of Healthcare
- In office 20 October 2005 – 23 April 2021
- President: Ilham Aliyev
- Preceded by: Ali Insanov
- Succeeded by: Teymur Musayev

Personal details
- Born: 2 August 1950 Baku, Azerbaijan SSR, USSR
- Died: 3 October 2025 (aged 75) Shuvalan, Khazar raion, Azerbaijan

Ogtay Shiraliyev Kazim oglu (Azerbaijani: Oqtay Şirəliyev Kazım oğlu; 2 August 1950 – 3 October 2025) was an Azerbaijani academic and politician who served as the Minister of Healthcare of Azerbaijan Republic from 2005 to 2021.

== Early life ==
Shiraliyev was born in Baku on 2 August 1950. He graduated from Azerbaijan Medical University and completed his doctoral degree in Moscow, Russia. In 1988, Shiraliyev was appointed the Director of State Medical Diagnostics Center which he headed for 17 years.

== Political career ==
On 20 October 2005, President Ilham Aliyev sacked previous minister Ali Insanov replacing him with Ogtay Shiraliyev. Within three months of his term, Shiraliyev reformed the medical services in state hospitals and received 30% increase in state healthcare funding. Construction of new medical diagnostic centers and hospitals in regions of Azerbaijan became a priority. On April 23, 2021, he was dismissed as minister.

Shiraliyev headed the Eurasia Congress of Infectious Diseases.

Shiraliyev oversaw the response to the COVID-19 pandemic in Azerbaijan.

== Death ==
Shiraliyev died from brain cancer at his home in Shuvalan, Khazar raion, on 3 October 2025, at the age of 75.
