= Jamil Aliyev =

Azerbaijani oncologist (born 1946)

Jamil Aliyev Azerbaijani: Cəmil Əliyev
- Born: March 30, 1946 (age 79); Baku, Azerbaijan SSR, USSR
- Citizenship: Soviet Union; Azerbaijan
- Education: Azerbaijan Medical University
- Known for: academician
- Awards
- Scientific career
- Fields: Medicine

Jamil Aziz oghlu Aliyev (Azerbaijani: Cəmil Əziz oğlu Əliyev, 30 March 1946) is a Doctor of Medicine, Professor, Academician of Azerbaijan National Academy of Sciences, Honored Scientist of the Azerbaijan Republic, Director of National Oncology Center of Ministry of Health of the Republic of Azerbaijan.

== Biography ==
Jamil Aliyev was born on March 30, 1946, in Baku. He was graduated from Azerbaijan Medical Institute in 1968.

In 1973, he defended his dissertation on "Diagnosis and treatment of cancer of the mucous membrane of the skin of the lower lip and oral cavity". In 1978, he defended his doctoral dissertation on "Plastic surgery for skin melanoma and cancer" at the All-Union Oncology Scientific Center of the USSR Academy of Medical Sciences in Moscow and was awarded the degree of Doctor of Medicine. In 1980, Jamil Aliyev was awarded the academician N. N. Petrov Prize of the USSR Academy of Medical Sciences for this monograph. In 1987, he was awarded the title of Professor of Oncology by the decision of the Supreme Attestation Commission of the USSR for effective activity in the field of training scientific personnel.

Professor Aliyev has headed the oncology department of Azerbaijan State Institute for the Improvement of Physicians named after A. Aliyev since 1994. Since 1990, he has been Director General of National Oncology Center. C. A. Aliyev is the author of more than 600 scientific articles, 10 inventions, and 18 monographs and textbooks for students.

In 2001, he was elected a full member of Azerbaijan National Academy of Sciences.

== Memberships ==
- Full member of Azerbaijan National Academy of Sciences
- Full member of New York Academy of Sciences
- Full member of Russian Academy of Natural Sciences
- Full member of Georgian National Academy of Sciences
- Foreign member of Russian Academy of Sciences
- Full member of European Academy of Natural Sciences
- Full member of International Academy of Turkish World Studies
- Full member of the International Eco-Energy Academy

== Awards ==
- Honored Scientist of Azerbaijan — 2000
- Shohrat Order — 2006
- Sharaf Order — 2016
- "Ambassador of Science and Peace" — 2018
- Academician M. Topchubashov award — 2003
- "Honored Scientist" of the Republic of Dagestan — 2011
- "Service to the Turkic world" Grand Gold Medal — 2015
- Academician N. N. Petrov Prize of the USSR Academy of Medical Sciences — 1980
- Y. Mammadaliyev Prize of "Knowledge" Enlightenment Society of Azerbaijan National Academy of Sciences — 1996
- N. Pirogov Order of the European Academy of Natural Sciences
- "Honorary scientist of Europe"
- V. Leibniz Medal
- Academician M. Mirgasimov Award

== See also ==
- Heydar Aliyev
