= Administration of Regional Medical Divisions =

Administration of the Regional Medical Divisions
- Tibbi Ərazi Bölmələrini İdarəetmə Birliyi
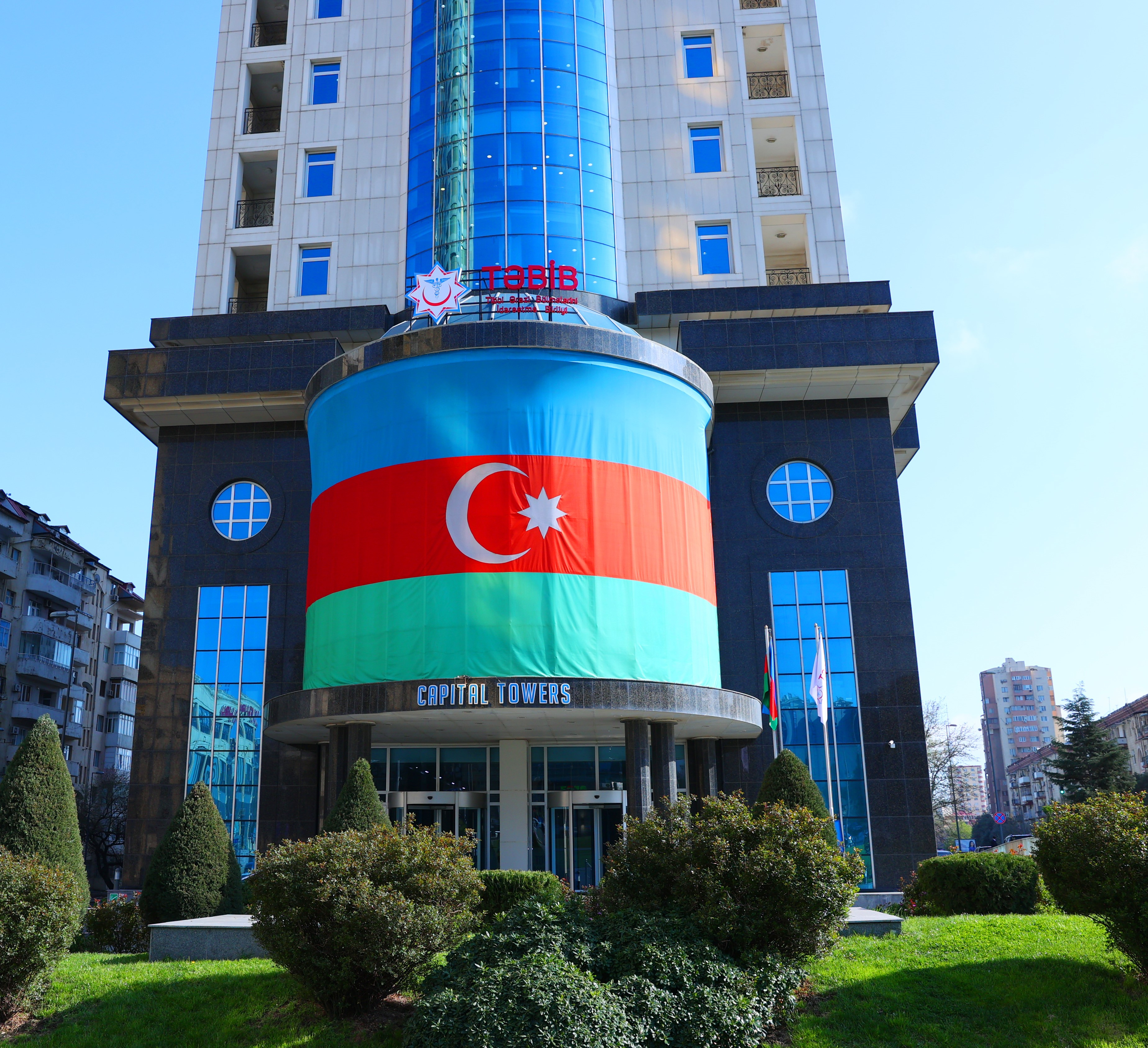

Agency overview
- Formed: 20 December 2018
- Jurisdiction: Public Legal Entity
- Headquarters: Capital Towers, 206A N.Narimanov Street, Baku, Azerbaijan AZ1065
- Agency executive: Vugar Gurbanov
- Parent agency: Administration of the President of the Republic of Azerbaijan
- Website: https://tabib.gov.az

Administration of the Regional Medical Divisions (TABIB) (Azerbaijani: Tibbi Ərazi Bölmələrini İdarəetmə Birliyi (TƏBİB))

TABIB is a public legal entity in the Republic of Azerbaijan. Mission of TABIB is to provide reliable and accessible healthcare services, by optimizing medical activities, and cover the population with high quality, innovative and accessible medical services. Operating as a governing body, TABIB holds the crucial role of planning and coordinating the activities of public medical institutions within the national healthcare system. The executive director of TABIB is Vugar Gurbanov.

== Healthcare system in Azerbaijan ==
Main parties responsible for healthcare in Azerbaijan are:

- Ministry of Health – health legislation, medical education, public health, accreditation, scientific research
- The Administration of the Regional Medical Divisions (TABIB) – management of medical institutions included in the state health care system;
- State Agency on Mandatory Health Insurance (SAMHI) –Public health insurance;
- Other private medical service providers– offering medical services.

=== Structure of TABIB ===
Number of Public medical institutions under TABIB:

- General medical units -3046
- Primary healthcare units- 2834
- Specialty medical centers- 202
- Number of state qualified medical centers- 10

==== Health Benefit Package (HBP) ====
The medical institutions subordinated to TABIB provide 3315 medical services within the Health Benefit Package (HBP) of the mandatory health insurance. In cases where medical services are not provided by TABIB's medical institutions, they are facilitated between the State Agency on Mandatory Health Insurance and contracted private medical institutions in Azerbaijan through referrals.

===== History =====
On December 20, 2018, President of Azerbaijan Ilham Aliyev signed a decree on the establishment of Administration of the Regional Medical Divisions (TABIB) under the State Agency on Mandatory Health Insurance to ensure the implementation of mandatory health insurance in the country.

On April 18, 2019, the list of medical institutions subordinate to the TABIB was approved.

== See also ==
- Azerbaijan
- Medicine in Azerbaijan
- Ministry of Healthcare (Azerbaijan)
- State Agency for Compulsory Health Insurance (Azerbaijan)
