= Medieval medicine =

Medieval medicine may refer to:

- Medieval medicine of Western Europe, pseudoscientific ideas from antiquity during the Middle Ages
- Byzantine medicine, common medical practices of the Byzantine Empire from about 400 AD to 1453 AD
- Medicine in the medieval Islamic world, the science of medicine developed in the Middle East
- Development of medicine in Azerbaijan during the Middle Ages
- Practices of Jewish medicine during the Middle Ages

== See also ==
- History of medicine
- Ibn Sina Academy of Medieval Medicine and Sciences, a trust registered in India in 1882
- Medicine in ancient Rome, various techniques influenced by Greek medicine
- On Ancient Medicine, c. 400 BC medical text associated with Hippocrates
- Traditional Chinese medicine, a branch of traditional medicine in China
