= Ali Insanov =

- Əli İnsanov
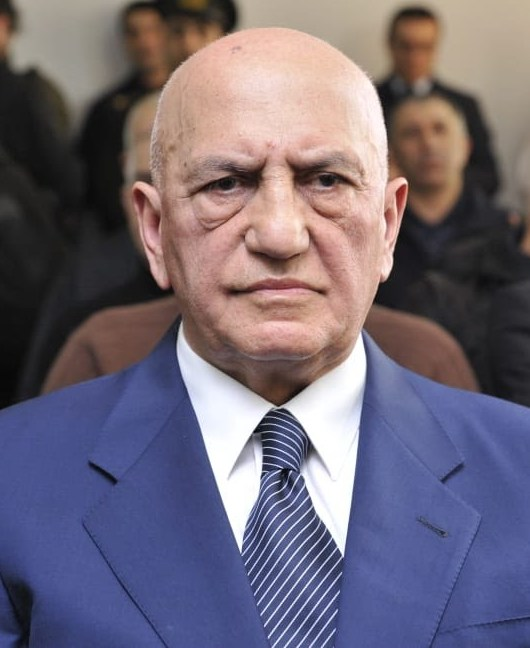
- Insanov in 2019

Minister of Healthcare
- In office 8 November 1993 – 20 October 2005
- President: Ilham Aliyev
- Preceded by: Rahim Huseynov
- Succeeded by: Ogtay Shiraliyev

Personal details
- Born: March 22, 1946 (age 80) Lambali, Armenian SSR

Ali Binnat oghlu Insanov (Azerbaijani: Əli Binnət oğlu İnsanov; born March 22, 1946) was the Minister of Health of Azerbaijan from 1993–2005.

== Life ==
Insanov was detained in October 2005. He was accused of attempting a coup d'état and causing mass riots. At the decision of the Azerbaijani Court on Heinous Crimes on 20 April, Ali Insanov was found guilty of appropriation of property and abuse of power and sentenced to 11 years imprisonment. He is currently being detained at the Bail Isolation Cell 1 of the Penitentiary Service of Azerbaijan. He demands to be transferred to the Patient Care Institution of the Penitentiary Service. Medical examinations on him have proved that he suffers from a vertebral hernia.
