= Teymur Musayev =

Azerbaijani minister of healthcare

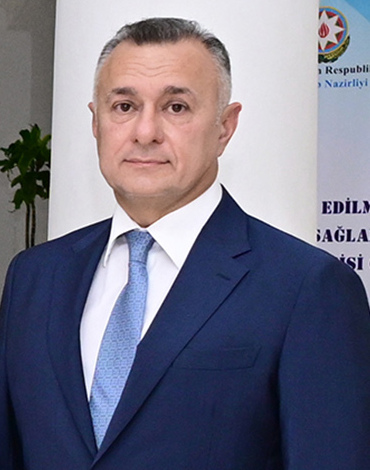

Minister of Healthcare
- Incumbent
- Assumed office 19 January 2022
- President: Ilham Aliyev
- Preceded by: Ogtay Shiraliyev
- Acting; 23 April 2021 – 19 January 2022
- Acting; 14 February 2024 – 16 February 2024

First Deputy Minister of Healthcare
- In office 23 April 2021 – 19 January 2022
- Preceded by: Position established

Personal details
- Born: 16 September 1970 (age 56) Baku, Azerbaijan SSR, USSR

Teymur Yusif oghlu Musayev (Azerbaijani: Teymur Yusif oğlu Musayev, 16 September 1970) is the Deputy Prime Minister of Azerbaijan.

== Biography ==
He was born on 16 September 1970 in Baku. He received his secondary education in the People's Democratic Republic of Algeria in 1977–1981 and then in Baku in 1981–1987. In 1987–1993 he studied at the faculty of treatment and prevention of the Azerbaijan Medical Institute. He defended his dissertation on 25 December 2000 and received the degree of PhD by the decision of the Higher Attestation Commission on 4 April 2001.

From 2003 to 2004, he was a student of the diploma course on "laparoscopic surgery" at the Louis Pasteur University, France. In 2013–2015 he studied at Riga International School of Business and Economics and Riga Stradiņš University, and in May 2015 received a master's degree in Master of Health Management (business executive).

Since April 2020, he has been the head of the Health Organization Department of the Ministry of Health. On 23 April 2021, President Ilham Aliyev signed an order appointing Teymur Yusif oglu Musayev First Deputy Minister of Health of the Republic of Azerbaijan. By another order, Teymur Yusif oglu Musayev was authorized to act as the Minister of Health of the Republic of Azerbaijan. On 19 January 2022, he was appointed Minister of Health of the Republic of Azerbaijan.

On October 19, 2026, by decree of the President of Azerbaijan, he was dismissed from the position of Minister of Health and appointed Deputy Prime Minister of Azerbaijan.
