= Institute of Cardiology of the Ministry of Health of Azerbaijan =

Health institute in Azerbaijan

Institute of Cardiology
- Parent institution: Ministry of Health of Azerbaijan
- Established: 1979
- Director: Dr. Gulnaz Dadashova
- Address: AZ1072, Baku city, Narimanov District, 101 Fatali Khan Khoyski Street
- Location: Baku, Azerbaijan
- Coordinates: 40.403979780051316°N 49.86149199394751°E
- Interactive map of Institute of Cardiology
- Website: https://www.etki.az/

Scientific Research Institute of Cardiology of the Ministry of Health of Azerbaijan (Azərbaycan Respublikası Səhiyyə Nazirliyinin Elmi-Tədqiqat Kardiologiya instututu) named in honor of the academician Jahangir Abdullayev is an institute in Baku, Azerbaijan. It is primarily focused on scientific researchs on cardiology. The Institute is directed by Gulnaz Dadashova.

== History ==
In 1979, the Institute was opened by the initiative of Heydar Aliyev.

In 2019, a scientific and practical conference was held in Baku to celebrate the 40th anniversary of the Institute of Cardiology.

In 2024, "Abacus Audit And Consulting" LLC became a winner of request for quotations for the audit of financial statements concluded by Institute of Cardiology.

In 2024, an Angiography Department opened at the Institute of Cardiology.
