= National Center of Oncology (Azerbaijan) =

Research institute in Baku, Azerbaijan

Coordinates: 40°24′03″N 49°48′15″E

The Azerbaijan National Center of Oncology (Azerbaijani: Milli Onkologiya Mərkəzi) is a scientific research institution that investigates oncological diseases and specializes in oncologic treatment. The National Center of Oncology has been led by Jamil Aliyev since 1990.

== History ==
On December 11, 1940, a resolution made by the Council of People's Commissars and the People's Commissariat for Health established the Scientific Radiology Institute in Azerbaijan. The Azerbaijani Scientific Research Institute of Roentgen Radiology (SRIRR) was created in 1941 to research and treat cancer. SRIRR was later renamed the Scientific Research Institute of Roentgenology, Radiology, and Oncology (SRIRRO) in compliance with a 1964 order from the Ministry of Health of Azerbaijan SSR. In the late 1980s, SRIRRO collaborated with several institutions located in other Soviet cities, including Kyiv, Leningrad (Saint Petersburg), and Moscow.

Beginning in 1974, many organizational changes began under the leadership of well-known oncologist R. N. Rahimov. These changes were followed by improvements in maintenance and quality of service. In 1988, SRIRRO was renamed the Republican Ontological Scientific Center (ROSC) by the Ministry of Health.

After Azerbaijan gained independence, prevention and treatment programs were organized. In 1995, the institute's name was changed to the National Center of Oncology (NCO). There are now eight oncology dispensaries in Azerbaijan.

The first regional Pediatric Oncology Clinic was created within the National Center of Oncology in 2012 with the support of the Heydar Aliyev Foundation and Mehriban Aliyeva. In 2014, two important departments were established within the NCO: the Medical Treatment Building and the Laboratory of Molecular Oncology. Several departments, such as Outpatient Chemotherapy, Chemotherapy, Invasive Diagnostics, Oncohematology (Hematology), and Endoscopy, can be found within the Medical Treatment Building.

== International relations ==
On March 11, 2010, the National Center of Oncology of Azerbaijan and the Cancer Aid International Onlus signed a bilateral memorandum, as part of which Italian surgeons were invited to Azerbaijan to attend surgical operations and training classes.

The NCO of the Ministry of Health of Azerbaijan and the Turkish Bayandir Healthcare Group signed an agreement in 2013. The agreement was designed to increase cooperation between the two organizations through the exchange of scientific research programs and organized training in oncology. Other cooperative relations with Turkey are realized according to the agreements with the Council of Higher Education of Turkey and the Turkish Gynecological Oncology Association.

The National Oncology Center has an agreement with the Belgian Health Fund in the field of scientific research cooperation in the prevention and medication of cancerous tumors. The signing ceremony was attended by the general directors of the NCO of Azerbaijan and the Belgian Health Fund, Jamil Aliyev and Herwig Fleerackers, in 2012. In the spirit of provision and implementation of technology and medical equipment for radiation therapy, NCO cooperates with Belgian Orfit Industries, a provider of medical equipment.

The NCO also cooperates with the government of Israel in the field of health. This is in accordance with an agreement signed by the general director of the National Center of Oncology of the Ministry of Health of Azerbaijan and Israeli ambassador Rafael Harpaz in 2013.
