= Medicine in Azerbaijan =

Medicine in Azerbaijan serves to protect the health and prosperity of citizens of the Republic of Azerbaijan. Reforms in the sphere of medical care and the health care system's direction are parts of a global strategic development program of economic and social infrastructure. This program is based on principles of the establishment of a high-life democratic society with a market economy.

== Early history ==
The history of medicine in Azerbaijan has deep roots. Its ancient people believed in sorcery as a way to combat various sicknesses. Stone Age carvings and pictographs in Azykh Cave show evidence of this belief in sorcery.

Early people used medicinal plants to treat different sicknesses. Their experience developed into what is known as traditional medicine. The division between the oral and written branches of traditional medicine originated with the invention of writing.

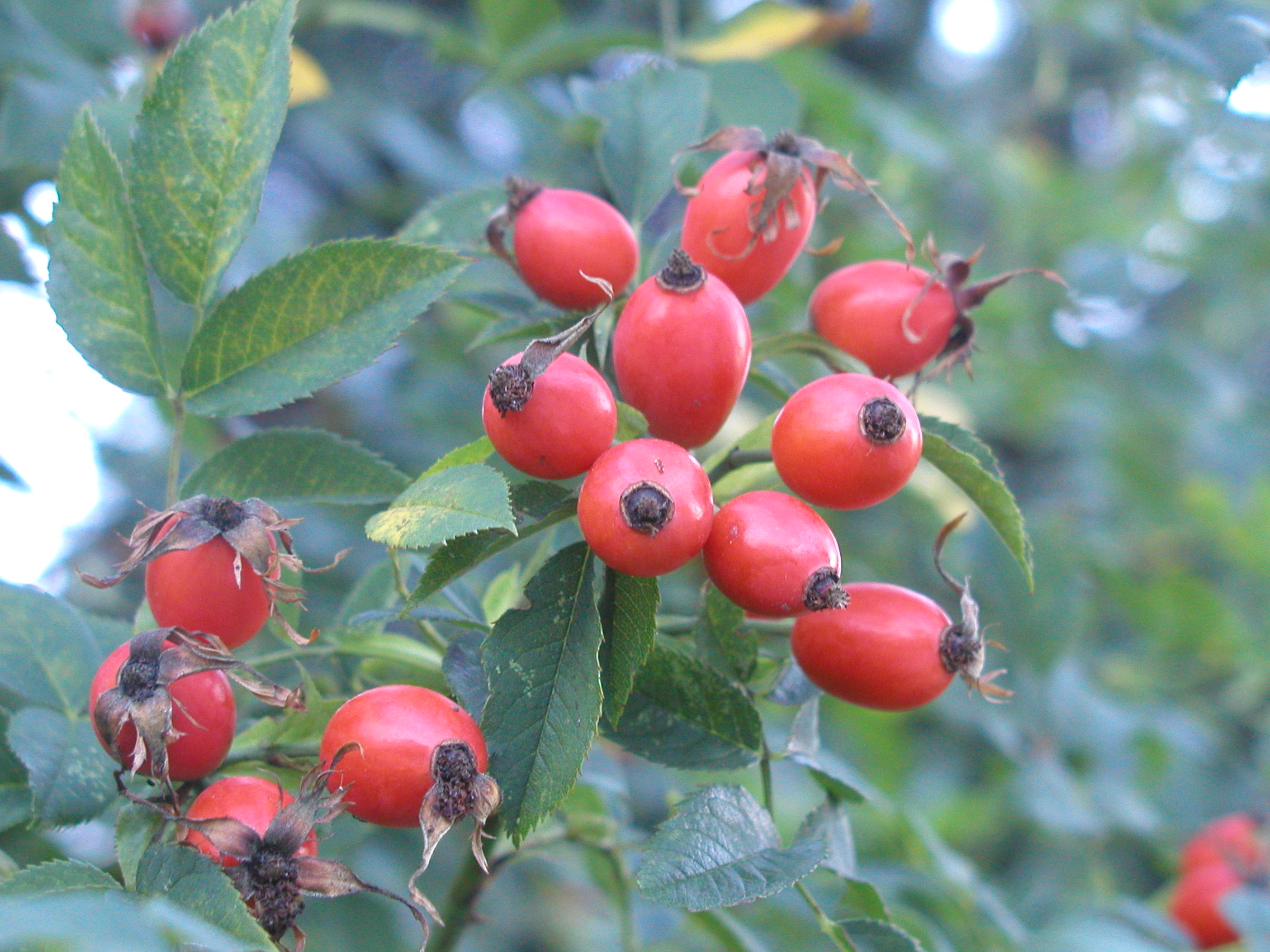
Fruits of common in Azerbaijan dogrose, the tea of which is used for treatment of cold.

The rich flora of Azerbaijan has attracted the attention of doctors and scientists from ancient times. A variety of medicinal plants were used for prophylaxis and treatment. The seeds, roots, flowers and leaves of these plants were all used in treatment. Women easily observed the influence of fruits, vegetables and medicinal tea upon the organism and their effects upon the cough, bleeding, ache, diarrhea and other illnesses.

From ancient manuscripts, it is known that they used not only plants but were also acquainted with surgery, treatment of tumors and setting of broken bones. For instance, Nariman Narimanov found a human skull dated from the 4th millennium BC (Eneolithic) with traces of trepanning on it in Erefli village of Agdam Rayon. In 1971, archeologist H.Kesemenli found a skull dated from the late Bronze and early Iron Ages on which a trepanation was performed in Khachbulag village of Dashkasan Rayon. R.Gasimova, who investigated the skull, said that “artificial trepanation was performed near junction of parietal and frontal bones”.

In 1958, pitchers dated from the 6th century BC with burned rues used as medicine to treat rheumatism, fever and prophylactics of various illnesses were found in Garakepektepe village of Mugan plain during archeological excavations.

Aromatherapy was also broadly spread. It was believed that the smell of a quince strengthens the body's energy. Lemon was used for adjusting the nervous system, and apple for stimulation of the brain's work.

In ancient times there was an active cultural interchange between Azerbaijanis and residents of Mesopotamia. Sesame oil and crocus were imported from Sumer. There is information about medicinal drugs and medicine in Avesta, a sacred book of fire-worshippers and the ancient monument of people of Azerbaijan and Iran. There is also written that “a doctor has three weapons: word, herbs and a knife”. A doctor curing by words and suggestion was considered as the best at that time.

Medicine of Caucasian Albania, descendants of which are considered Azerbaijanis, was also developing. Medicinal plants were planted there from the Roman Empire. Works by Hippocrates and Claudius Galenus were popular there because of the spreading of Christianity and the Greek language. Some knowledge about medicine was taught in religious schools and churches.

== Development of medicine in the Middle Ages ==
In this period, medicine was quickly developing, which is evidenced by archeological findings. For instance, polished marble vessels for antimony and golden brushes for applying it, used as anti-cough and antiemetic medicine in the Middle Ages, were found. Sick men drunk wine from these made of antimony cups. Various glass vessels used for preparation and storage of medicines, which alchemists used in traditional medicine and pharmacology, were found in Shamakhi during excavations. These findings confirm that people in Azerbaijan were engaged in pharmaceutics in the Middle Ages.

According to Farid Alakbarli, a historian, Turkish traditional medicine called “Turkachare” and was similar to shamanism and treatment by wizardry and herbs began to be spread in the 4th century AD with the entering of Turkic tribes into Azerbaijan. In Turkish, doctors were called gam, which meant “shaman”, or otachi which meant “herbalist”. Herbals were called ota (ot is herb in translation from Turkic). Goddess Oleng was considered as the patroness of doctors.

Shirvan, where mainly Albanians and Iranians lived, was occupied by Arabs. Sciences and culture developed due to the mutual influence of cultures as a part of a single Caliphate. Universities, observatories, libraries, mosques and hospitals were built. Progress of medicine is observed, namely in the Islamic period. At that time, madrasa, where Arabic and Persian languages, religion, math, calligraphy, history and literature were taught, functioned in Azerbaijan. Medicine and alchemy were also taught there. “Malham” madrasa in Shamakhi was one of the most famous madrasas of that time. Eminent scientist and doctor Kafiyaddin Omar ibn Osman – uncle of eminent Persian poet Khagani Shirvani – led this educational institution.

Copy of “The Canon of Medicine” work written in Arabic, in 1030, by doctor Ibn Sina, famed in Europe as “Avicenna” and who also was in Azerbaijan where he collected information about medicine, was found out in Azerbaijan among other manuscripts about medicine. In his work, Ibn Sina wrote about the Saburkhast settlement in Azerbaijan. This copy of “The Canon” was made in Baghdad in 1143 and is considered one of the most ancient manuscripts in the sphere of pharmacology and medicine in the world and the most ancient in Azerbaijan. It was broadly used both in the whole Muslim world and in Christian Europe and greatly influenced the development of medicine. There are descriptions of hundreds of medicines in it.

Copy of “The Canon of Medicine” work written in Arabic, in 1030, by doctor Ibn Sina, and made in 1143, in Baghdad. Institute of Manuscripts of Azerbaijan of Azerbaijan National Academy of Sciences, in Baku

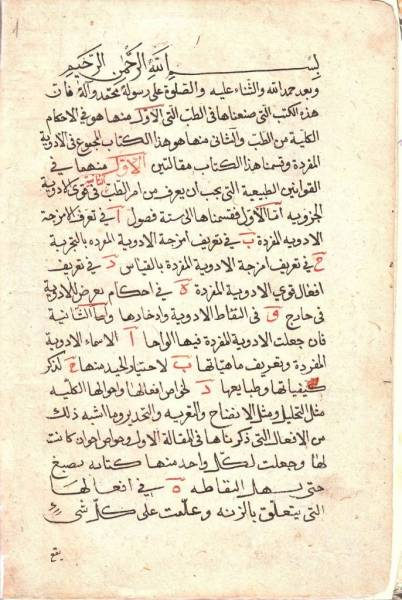

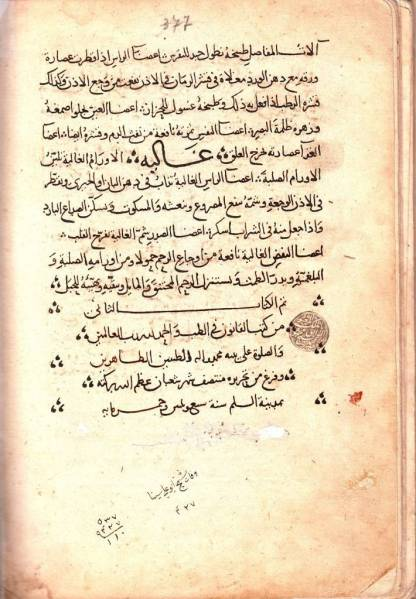

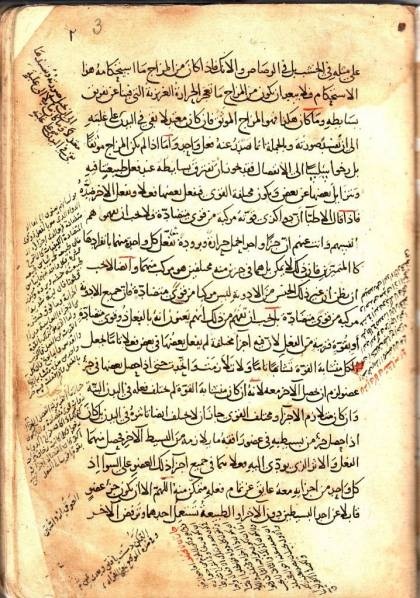

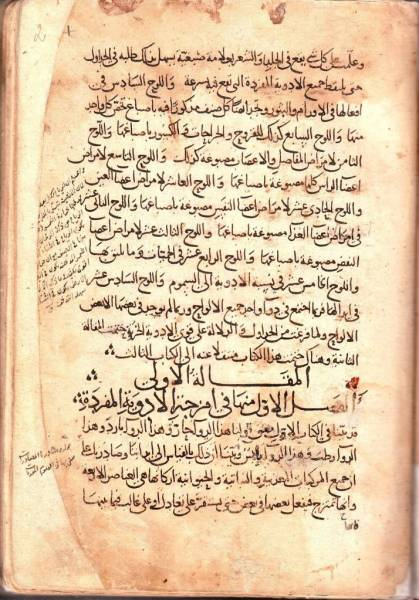

Bahmanyar al Azerbaijani (died in 1067), a student of Ibn Sina, also famed among scientists of the 11th century. Bahmanyar touched upon issues in medicine in his philosophic work called “at-Tahsil” (“Understanding”).

Manuscript copy of “Al-Magala as-Salasun” (“The thirteenth treatise”) written in the 13th century by Abu al-Gasim al-Zahravi, an eminent scientist from Andalusia, who famed in Europe as Abulgasis (died in 1013) also came from Azerbaijan. It is one of the most ancient manuscripts of this book. About 200 surgery instruments had been mentioned in this book. Their assignments also had been explained there. The work influenced the development of surgery both in the East and also in Europe. Professor Ziya Bunyadov translated it into Russian, and after it was published in Moscow in 1983.

Manuscript copy of “Al-Magala as-Salasun” (“The thirteenth treatise”) written in the 13th century by Abu al-Gasim al-Zahravi, an eminent scientist of the 11th century. Institute of Manuscripts of Azerbaijan of Azerbaijan National Academy of Sciences, in Baku

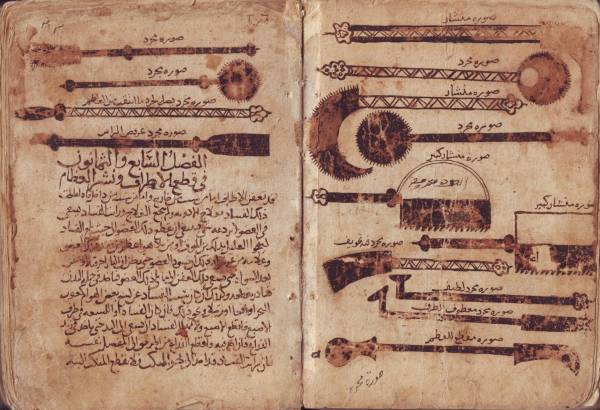

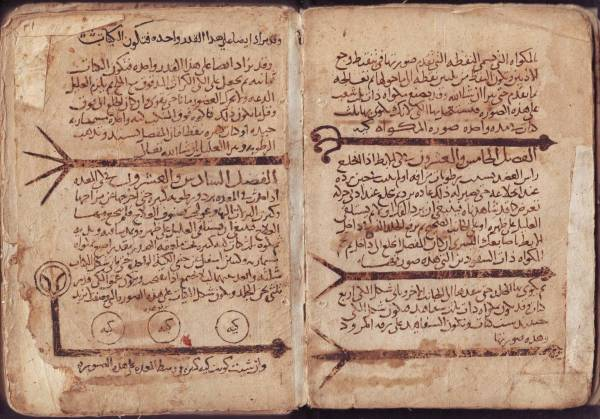

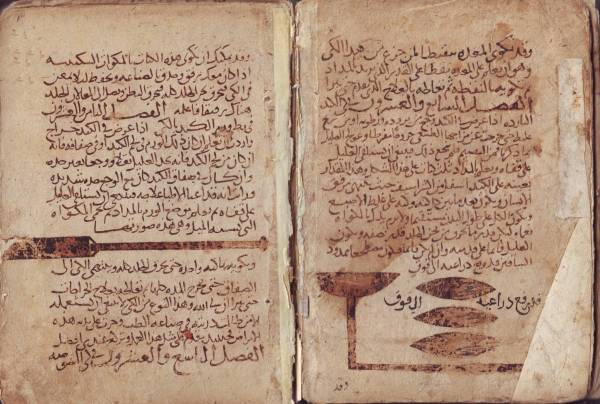

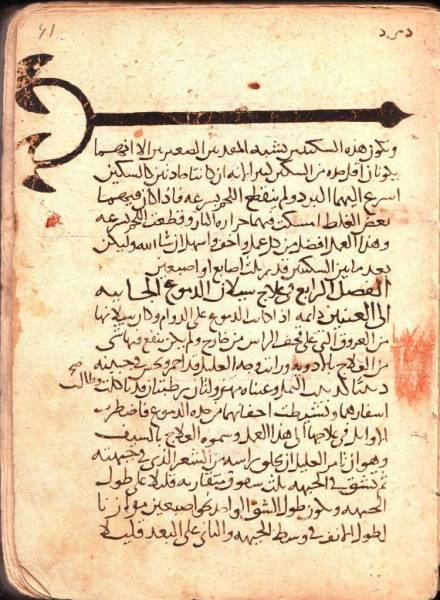

Medieval doctors warned sick people against tiredness. For example, Mahmud ibn Ilyas, a doctor who lived in the 12th century, advised nervous people to listen to mugham.

Medicine was strongly developing in the 13th century in the Great Seljuq Empire of Azerbaijani Atabegs. Almost every eastern scientist and philosopher had work in medicine. Residents from different oblasts of Azerbaijan compiled, rewrote and investigated books in medicine, including monuments of the 14th-18th centuries. There are more than four hundred manuscripts in medicine in Azerbaijani, Arabic, Persian and Turkish languages, both written in the territory of modern Azerbaijan and brought from different oblasts in the Muhammad Fuzuli Institute of Manuscripts of Azerbaijan of Azerbaijan National Academy of Sciences in Baku. According to Kōichirō Matsuura, the former Director-General of UNESCO, “this collection shows the role of Azerbaijan in the development of world medicine”.

“Zahirai Nizamshahi”, written by Rustam Jurjani in the 13th century, was also partly investigated in Azerbaijan. Its manuscript had been copied in the 16th century, is saved in the Baku Institute of Manuscripts. There were descriptions of pharmaceutical herbs, substances of animal origin, minerals and some complex medicines are included in it. The manuscript has not been found in any other storage of the world and exists in only exemplar in Azerbaijan.

Copy of 16th century of “Zahirai Nizamshahi” written by Rustam Jurjani in the 13th century. Institute of Manuscripts of Azerbaijan of Azerbaijan National Academy of Sciences, in Baku

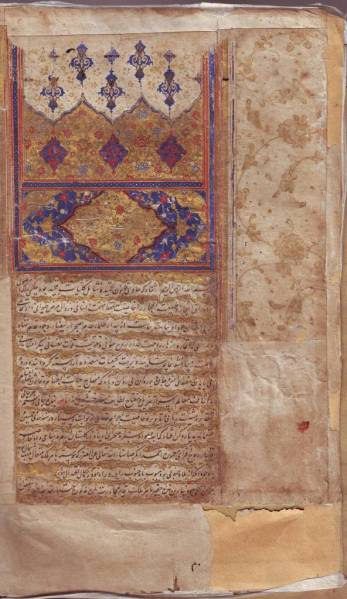

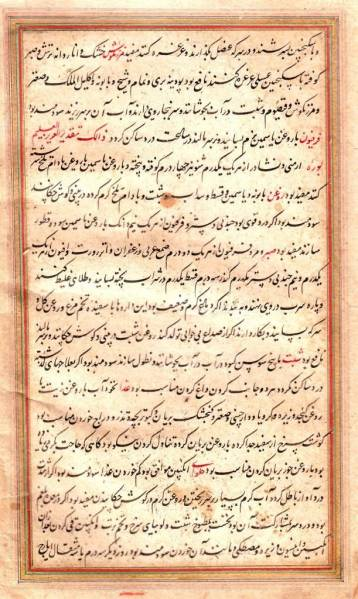

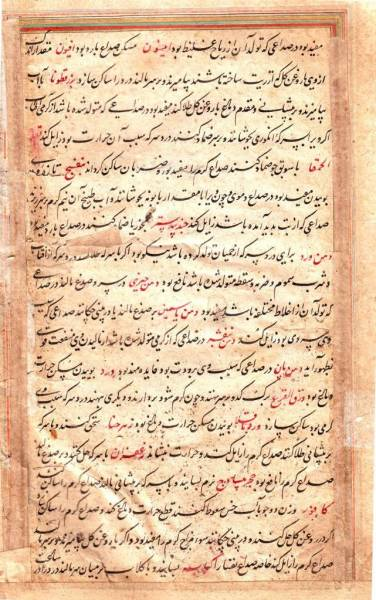

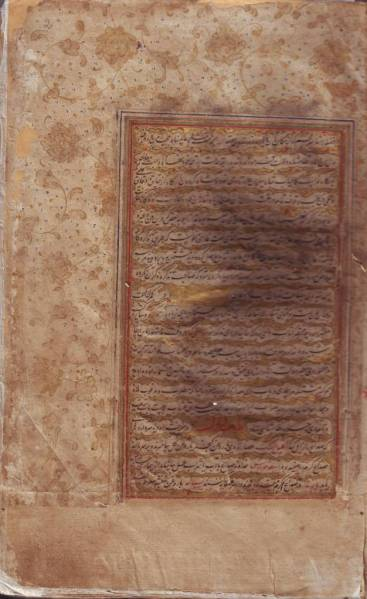

“About treatment science” work by Mahmud ibn Ilyas (the 14th century) in which fundamental ideas of medicine, symptoms and reasons of specific illnesses are described also famed.

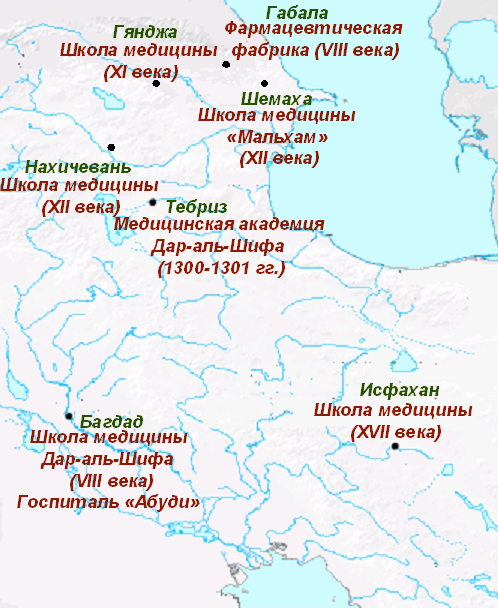
The greatest medical centers of medieval Azerbaijan and adjacent regions of the East.

Yusif Garabaghi, an Azerbaijani doctor of the 16th century, who came from Karabakh, wrote many medicine treatises and also “Explanations and interpretations of “The Canon of Medicine” by Ibn Sina”. He lived in Central Asia for a long time and taught in Samarkand.

Mir Muhammad Momin, palatial figure at Suleyman the Safavid, wrote several instructive works in Persian, including “Tohfat al Mominin” in 1669. Descriptions of more than 4000 plants, animals, minerals and other ingredients used in medicine were written in the work. Momin described each plant, its specific characteristic, where it can be picked, other oblasts where it is used, and its name in other languages such as Chinese and Hindi in detail.

In 1712, Muhammad Yusif Shirvani wrote “Tibbname” in the Azerbaijani language. Being a palatial doctor, Shirvani advised using natural minerals for treatment, for example, rubbing an orange peel for tiredness in the neck. In this work, it's also written that the resting place of sick men should be decorated with flowers in light-blue, green, and white tints. It means that even color had great importance in the works of medieval healers.

Generally, in the 17th-18th centuries, a number of works had been written in the sphere of medicine and pharmacology by Azerbaijani scientists such as Murtuzagulu Shamlu (sexual pathologist), Abdulhasan Maraghai, pharmacologists such as Hasan Rza oglu Shirvani, Haji Suleyman Iravani, and others. 724 kinds of medicinal plants were described.

== Development of medicine in the 19th and early 20th century ==
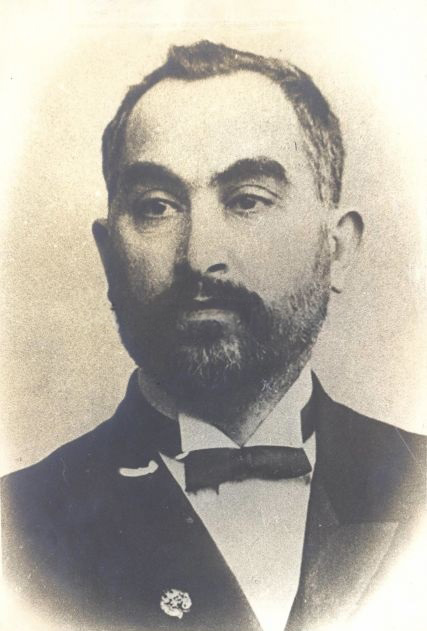
Abdulkhalig Akhundov, founder of the basis of scientific investigation in the history of medicine in Azerbaijan.

In the early 19th century when northern khanates of Azerbaijan (Shirvan, Baku, Nakhchivan, Quba, Talysh, Karabakh, Shaki, Derbend and other) were joined to Russia and the southern (Tabriz, Khoy, Ardabil and others) ones to Iran, Azerbaijani community in Iran continued to exist under the influence of Persian and generally, the whole Islamic culture, but Azerbaijani community in the Russian Empire (later the USSR) was developing under the influence of Europeanized secular Russian culture (mainly in the Soviet times). Medicine in two regions was developing in two different ways.

There was no European-like pharmacy in Azerbaijan until 1828. During the reign of the Russian such hospitals and pharmacies were established in Azerbaijan as in the whole South Caucasus, where Russian doctors applied their skills.

Abdulkhalig Akhundov founded the basis of scientific investigation in the history of medicine in Azerbaijan. Abdulkhalig studied and translated the famous pharmaceutics encyclopedia written by Abu Mansur Kharavi in the 9th century from Persian into German. After, the book was published in Germany. Abdulkhalig Akhundov also defended a dissertation in the history of medicine at the University of Tartu. In 1895, Dr.Mammad Rza Vakilov, Dr.Kerimbey Mehmandarov and others established Baku Union of Medicine.

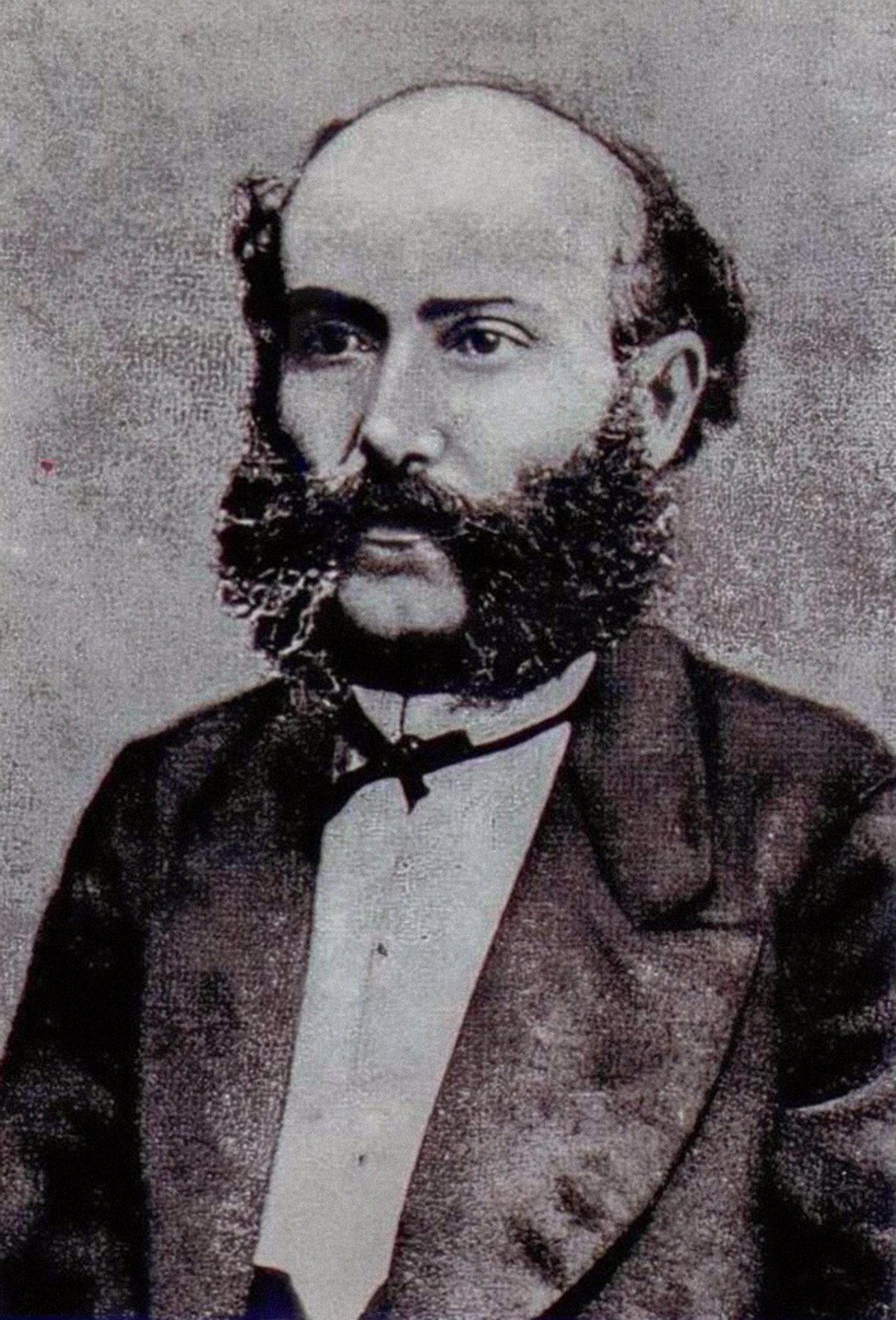
Hasan bey Zardabi

Hasan bey Zardabi and Mirza Fatali Akhundov used knowledge in medicine in their works for expression of philosophical ideas. Akhundov was one of the firsts who acted against traditional healers. He was the author of works about hygiene and sanitary. Zardabi also had an important role in the development of medicine. He was the first Azerbaijani in the sphere of natural history and Social Darwinism.

Being the author of “Akinchi” – the first Azerbaijani newspaper in the Russian Empire – Zardabi, together with Akhundov worked upon works about malaria devastated the country at that time. His “Hygiene” book is the first scientific research work about medicine in the sphere of hygiene in Azerbaijan. It was published in 1914, in Azerbaijan.

Sometimes doctors gave gratuitous help to sick men. During cholera devastation in Nakhchivan, in 1847, Mirza Nasrulla Mirza Ali oglu gratuitously treated both Azerbaijani and Armenian sick men, due to which he was respected among people.

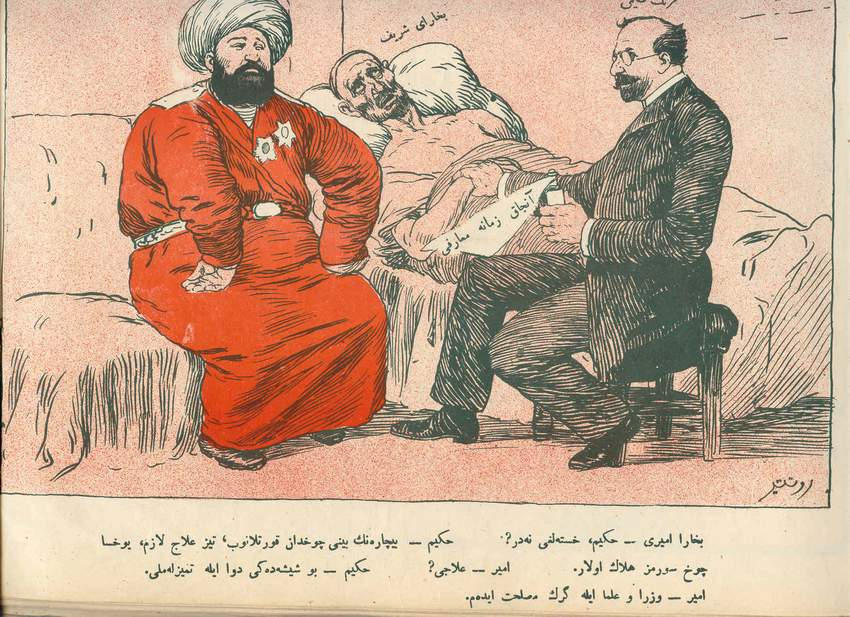
"Holy Bukhara". “Molla Nasraddin”, 1911, No. 20. Artist I.Rotter

Alongside all these, pharmacies where herbs imported from Iran and India were sold, were also functioning at that time. Such pharmacies were in every city of Azerbaijan – Baku, Shamakhi, Shusha, Aghdam, Nakhchivan, Lahij, Ordubad, Salyan, Lankaran etc. Mir-Baba Mir-Abdulla oglu, father of eminent Azerbaijani literary man Yusif Vazir Chamanzaminli had a pharmacy in Aghdam. 142 kinds of medicines, more than 100 of which were made of herbs, were sold in his pharmacy. Chamanzaminli himself, being the son of the pharmacist, described everyday life and practices of Azerbaijani healers of the 19th century in his narrative called “The Doctor”.

Such pharmacies were mainly in Iranian (Southern) Azerbaijan. At the beginning of the 20th century, treatment by herbs was enough to spread the method of treatment in Azerbaijan. But healers perceived the appearance of new, modern medicines as something strange.

“Molla Nasraddin” – popular Azerbaijani magazine of that time, which was of great importance in medicine education, criticized such kinds of remains of the past, ridiculed backwardness of healers-evils of that time, their ignorant treatment of modern knowledge in medicine. For instance, a caricature called “Holy Bukhara” (painted by Azim Azimzade) was given in the 20th issue of the magazine (1911). Here the image of Bukhara emir, doubtfully treating recommendations of the doctor about a new medicine.

== Medicine in Azerbaijan Democratic Republic ==
In 1918, the Ministry of health-care led by Dr.Rafiyev was established in the independent Azerbaijan Democratic Republic. Dozens of new pharmacies and hospitals were opened in Baku and Ganja at that time.

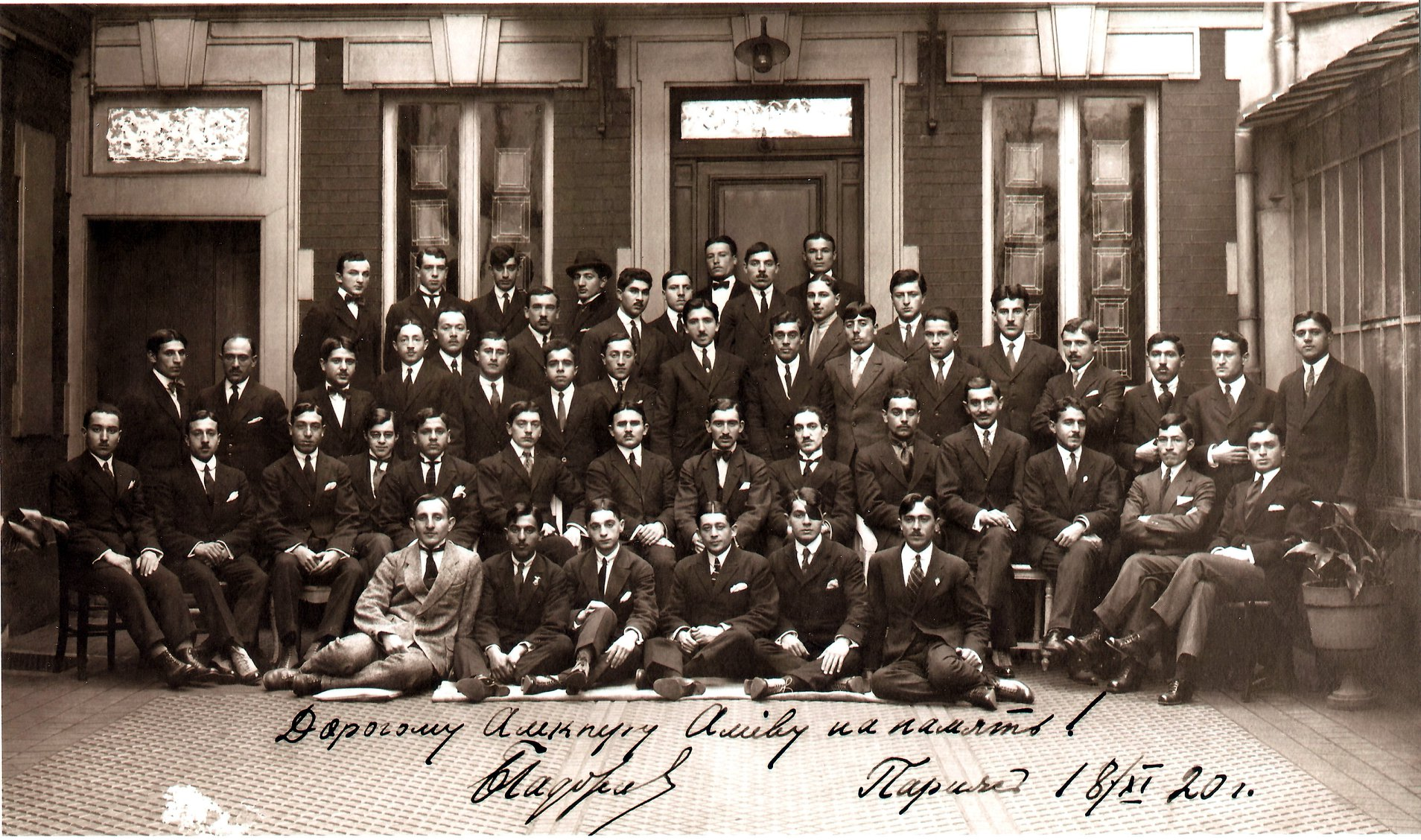
Azerbaijani students in Paris, 1920.

Many students of Azerbaijan Democratic Republic sent for educating abroad, mainly to Germany, Saint Petersburg, Moscow, Kiev and other cities, learned medicine there.

In 1919, Baku State University with a medicine faculty was established in Baku. Professor V.I.Razumovskiy, an eminent surgeon, became its first chairman (until 1920). History of medicine was also taught there. Razumovskiy established the First Preparatory Commission for a short period of time. Admission examinations were held in August of the same year and so the first course of students – future doctors – was collected.

On August 2, 1922, there were only three Azerbaijanis – A.Alakbarov, Jeyran Sultanova, and Adliya Shahtakhtinskaya-Babayeva, who became the Doctor of Sciences and Professor – among the first 29 alumni of medicine faculty.

== Medicine in the Azerbaijan SSR ==
After establishment of the Soviet Power, during the 1920s, pharmacies, where herbs were sold, were closed, and manuscripts written with Arabic alphabet were burned. It was a part of the Soviet Power's policy carried out against Islam (mainly in Azerbaijan and Central Asia).

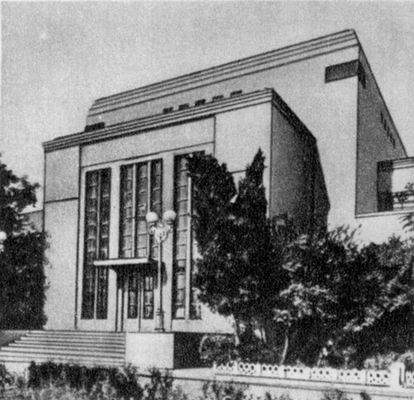
Building of Physiotherapy Institute in Baku, 1930s.

Nariman Narimanov, who also was a doctor, was the leader of a newly established administration. From 1920 to 1921 Aghahuseyn Kazimov and then in 1935 Mir Movsum Gadirly were national commissars of health-care in the Azerbaijan SSR.

In 1930, Azerbaijan State Medical Institute was established and M.N.Gadirly was its first rector. Eminent scientists and professors such as I.Shirokorogov, S.Davidenkov, F.Ilyin, Lev Levin, N.Ushinkiy, k.Malinovskiy and others had a great contribution to the development of the institute. Scientists such as M.Mirgasimov, M.A.Topchubashov, A.M.Aliyev, I.M.Ismayilzade, and others graduated from this institute, who then brought Azerbaijani medical science fame.

Generally, from 1920 to 1940 hundreds of polyclinics, hospitals and pharmacies were established in Azerbaijan. Academicians such as Mirasadulla Mirgasimov and Mustafa Topchubashov, and professors such as Alibey Alibeyov, Kamil Balakishiyev, and others were world-famous scientists and doctors of Azerbaijan.

== Medicine in the Republic of Azerbaijan ==
In the first years of independence, the situation in healthcare was very bad in Azerbaijan. The government could keep the healthcare system standing just with the support of international organizations. The necessary medical equipment, lack of medicine was a great problem.

A new stage in the development of medicine began after Azerbaijan acquired independence. More than 10 laws were established in the sphere of health-care. In March 1998, Heydar Aliyev, former president of Azerbaijan, signed a direction “About establishment of State Committee of reforms in the sphere of health-care”. Unique state policy was established in the country and the quality of medical service of the population was also improved.As soon as healthcare programs which were included repair and rehabilitation of medical institutions, providing them with equipment, provision and treatment of citizens with free medicines and preparations, diagnostic centers in the regions, in particular coverage of children with all medical services were accepted. Today medical centers and modern pharmaceutics industry of Azerbaijan is created at a level of world standards. A national plan against illnesses such as HIV/AIDS and tuberculosis is developed in the country. In 2001, a direction about the celebration of June 17 as a holiday of healthcare employers was signed. In 2004, Azerbaijani Association of Medicine Historians which was included in the International Union of the History of Medicine headquartered in Paris, in 2005, was established. The First National Conference of the Association was held on February 1–2 of the same year in Baku. In recent years Heydar Aliyev Foundation has launched a number of projects on the treatment of diabetes, thalassemia, blood donation campaigns, and the protection of maternal and child health.

About 870 private medical companies and 2,300 pharmaceutical organizations operate in Azerbaijan. The Health system in modern Azerbaijan includes mainly primary healthcare, outpatient, and inpatient services.

In 2012–2013, 11 priority healthcare programs with a total amount of 387.7 million manat were implemented in the country. In 2013 the amount of funds allocated to the healthcare system from the state budget has been increased 11 times compared to 2003. On the basis of this growth, up to 500 healthcare facilities were created or renewed. The range of the most important medicine supply has been increased from 60 to 166. Over the past 10 years, the mortality rates have decreased; the natural population grows increased.

Within the framework of the "Health Month" disease prevention campaign organized by the Ministry of Health in December in 2012 under the slogan "For a Healthy Life” medical institutions that carry out prophylactic examinations have been provided with the necessary equipment and reagents, 3 million patients were checked and treated accordingly.

M. Topchubashov Scientific Surgery Center carried out open heart surgery for adults and children for the first time in these years. In the Republican Clinical Urology Hospital named after M. Javadzade kidney transplantation has been started in early 2000.

In order to treat patients with chronic renal failure, more than 2,000 patients are receiving hemodialysis sessions in 27 centers and are provided with appropriate medications. Measures have been taken to improve the quality of medical services provided to mothers and children. If the infant mortality rate in the country was 16.7 in 2003. In 2013 this figure was 10.8. The maternal mortality ratio decreased from 18.5 to 14.9, compared to 2003.

According to the Law "On Education", the training of physicians in the country is carried out through residency, accepted in the medical education system of most countries of the world. In 2012 about 500 doctors were admitted to residency in various specialties passing through the State Commission on Student Admission. Besides, in 2009–2012, 451 doctors and midwives have been trained in private and state clinics in foreign countries for 3–6 months.

Refresher training sessions were organized in Baku with the participation of specialists from different countries and 1363 participants have gained practical knowledge in these training sessions. Since 2003, 12 relevant decisions have been established to increase the salaries of medical workers.

Within the framework of the "Electronic Azerbaijan" State Program "Citizen's Electronic Health Card" has been launched. There are currently about 10 registrars of various diseases, a single registry of cadres, an electronic surveillance system of infectious diseases, drug circulation, a dispatching service of an emergency medical station, and others. The Ministry of Health has provided 38 e-services. The "Electronic Services" section has been created on the official website of the Ministry and there are 11 electronic services.

The Ministry of Health cooperates with about 40 countries. In addition, the Sanitation and Epidemiological Service Development Program for 2015-2020 has been developed, which took appropriate measures to prevent infectious diseases. An Action Plan covering 2013–2020 on combating non-infectious diseases (such as tobacco smoking, obesity, physical activity, alcohol use disorder, etc.) and National Action Plan on Early Prevention and Treatment of Childhood Disorders (2014-2020) have been implemented.

In 2009, a new approach was introduced which seeks to define the number and type of staff needed in the system based on demographic criteria.

In July 2009, the government issued a new law on education. Within the framework of the law on education the Ministry of Health had to prepare a draft law on medical education by October 2009. The Azerbaijan Medical University is the only provider of undergraduate medical education in the country. Several unlicensed private medical schools operated in the late 1990s and early 2000s, but they all were closed by the Ministry of Education by 2005. In 2013 about 1020 medical students are enrolled annually in 8 departments.

The Department of Human Resources, Education and Science of Ministry of Health, organizing the planning of health staff, provides data on vacancies in health facilities. In accordance with data on vacancies the Ministry of Health asks the Azerbaijan Medical University to provide them with medical staff. The University sends graduates to the relevant specialty internships. The planning of nursing and midlevel healthcare personnel also follows the same process.

Since February 1, 2008 governmental medical institutions show a gratuitous medical aid to population, by a direction signed by Ogtay Shirinov, a minister of health-hare of Azerbaijan. In November, 2009, Azerbaijani doctors performed the first operation in heart for prevention of arrhythmia.

43 new hospitals and diagnostic centers, 46 outpatient polyclinics, 4 restoration centers for disabled persons and 12 diagnostics and health centers were put into operation during the last years. 30 medical institutions and 5 polyclinics are to be constructed in 2013. Indicators of longevity and birth rate have improved because of the development of the medicine in the country.

=== Medical training ===
There are eight nursing schools in Azerbaijan which closely cooperate with the Ministry of Health. Being a nurse does not require higher education. Candidates may become a nurse by graduating from a nurse training school. Graduated nurses are presented with vocational diplomas. In 2008, the total annual admission to all nursing schools was 1950. Postdiploma education for nurses is provided through three nursing schools located in Baku, Ganja and Mingechevir. Depending on the specialty, refresher trainings are required every five years. The course duration is from five days to two months. In 2008, approximately 2200 nurses completed these trainings.

Physicians should participate in refresher trainings every five years that organized by the Azerbaijan Physicians’ Advancement Institute. In 2008, more than 2700 physicians attended various refresher trainings organized by Institute. At the same time international organizations such as UNICEF, UNFPA, WHO, USAID, etc. also organized and funded various trainings on maternal child care, primary care and emergency medicine, family planning and reproductive health, primary care and public health, and others. The trainings lasted from 22 months to 30 months depending on specialty profile.

=== Sanitary-Epidemiological Service ===
Public health services are provided by different agencies, including the Sanitary-Epidemiological Service, Public Health and Reforms Center of the Ministry of Health, the National HIV/AIDS Center and other structures.

The Sanitary Epidemiological Service defines sanitary and hygienic norms and regulations include drinking water, sanitation, living and workspace hygiene, food hygiene such as production, distribution, storage, sale and handling of food products, occupational and environmental hygiene, and radiation hygiene. The activity of the Service also include control over state sanitary surveillance and epidemiological investigation, social-hygienic monitoring, preventing and eliminating infectious and parasitic diseases and food poisoning, planning sanitary-hygienic and anti-epidemic activities, reviewing the sanitary-epidemiological situation, controlling quality of environment, physical development of and morbidity among the population, implementing programs on health of the population.

The Sanitary Epidemiological Service consists of two structures: Sanitary Epidemiological Surveillance Inspection Service and Hygiene and Epidemiology Center. The first one controls the activity of the specialized hygiene and epidemiology centers as well as carries out implementation of state sanitary surveillance.

Hygiene and Epidemiology Center provides organizational-methodological supervision in about 83 district and city. The Center is responsible for the hygiene and epidemiology of water transport.

=== Pharmaceutical sector ===
Since 2006 Pharmaceutical sector operates actively. This sector is adjusted on the laws on pharmaceutical activity and products, circulation of narcotics, psychotropic substances and their precursors, establishment and activity of a pharmacy, analytical expertise center for medicines, rules for state registration of Pharmaceuticals and management of drug registry, list of over-the-counter pharmaceuticals.

Between 1996 and 2005 pharmaceuticals were registered and given license by the Department of Licensing and Medical Equipment of the Ministry of Health. In 2005 the Innovation and Supply Center was established to check the quality of medicines, as well as to ensure healthcare organizations with medicines. The Center also license pharmaceutical entities.

Pirallahi Industrial Park of Azerbaijan may become an important center for the local production of pharmaceuticals.
