= Azerbaijan Medical University =

Medical school in Baku, Azerbaijan

- Azərbaycan Tibb Universiteti
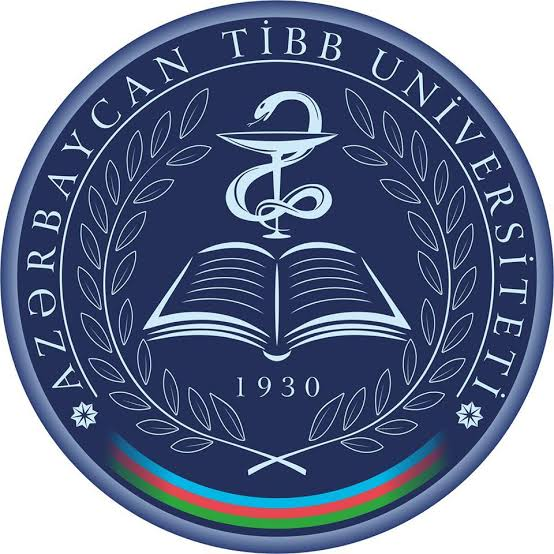
- Type: Public
- Established: May 9, 1930
- Academic affiliations: BSUN, IAU
- Rector: Garay Garaybayli
- Academic staff: 1,231
- Students: 7,270
- Location: Baku, Azerbaijan; 40°23′46″N 49°49′59″E
- Campus: Urban
- Website: amu.edu.az
- Location in Baku, Azerbaijan Azerbaijan Medical University (Azerbaijan) Azerbaijan Medical University (Caucasus Mountains)

Azerbaijan Medical University (Azerbaijani: Azərbaycan Tibb Universiteti) is a public medical school located in Baku, Azerbaijan. Due to difficulties with translation, the school is sometimes called: Azerbaijan Medical University, Azerbaijan State Medical University, Azerbaijan State Medical Institute, or simply Medical University, with any of the preceding including the "named after N. Narimanov" or full "Nariman Narimanov". The school is named after Nariman Narimanov, a famous Azerbaijani in Soviet politics, notably party chairman of the Central Executive Committee of the Soviet Union.

== History ==
Founded on 9 May 1930, the medical school grew out of the Department of Medicine of Baku State University. During World War II, the institute trained 2,082 doctors. By the decree of the President of the Supreme Soviet of the Azerbaijan SSR, the medical institute was named after a doctor and writer Nariman Narimanov on 29 April 1957. All further activities of the institute were associated with his name. In the fall of 2013, the University's Training and Surgical Clinic was opened.

== Rectors ==
The rectors of the medical institute were

- M. Kadyrli (1930)
- N. Mamedli (1931-1932)
- A. Aliev (1932-1934)
- M. Guseinov (1934-1935)
- A. Aliev (1935-1938)
- M. Aliev (1938-1942)
- Z. Mamedov (1943-1946)
- B. Eyvazov (1946-1964)
- H. Hasanov (1964-1968)
- B. Medzhidov (1968-1972)
- Z. Kulieva (1972-1983)
- Z. Mamedov (1983-1992)
- A. Amiraslanov (1992-2016)
- Garay Geraybeyli (since 2016)

== Departments and faculties ==
The school has 8000 students in 74 academic departments, with a faculty of scientists, physicians and lecturers numbering just over 1000. There are 4 clinics, educational-dental, oncologic, educational-therapeutic clinic, educational-surgical functioning within the university.

== Academic ==
=== postgraduate ===
Faculty	Establishment Year	Dean of Faculty
I Treatment and Prevention	5 May 1974	Elshad Mirzeli oglu Novruzov
II Treatment and Prevention	5 May 1974	Israel Shemshed oglu Meherrimbeyli
Public Health	1930	Galina Ganiyeva Sedirovna
Dentistry	1954	Said Ilham oglu Ahmedov
Pharmacy	1938	Fereh Ilham gizi Medetli
Military Medicine	25 May 2000	

=== Specialty Training ===
Faculty
Anesthesiology and Reanimatology
General Surgery
Neurosurgery (Brain Surgery)
Plastic Surgery
Cardiovascular Surgery
Pediatric Surgery
Ear, Nose, and Throat (ENT)
Traumatology and Orthopedics
Urology
Urology
Ophthalmology
Gynecology and Obstetrics
Psychiatry
Neurology
Internal Medicine (Therapeutic Medicine)
Cardiology
Nephrology
Gastroenterology
Hematology
Dermatology and Venereology
Immunology
Allergology
Infectious Diseases
Rheumatology
Endocrinology
Addiction Science (Narcology)
Physiotherapy and Medical Rehabilitation
Pulmonology (Phthisiatry)
Pathological Anatomy and Forensic Medicine
Pediatrics (Child Health and Diseases)
Radiotherapy
Radiology
Dentistry
Maxillofacial Surgery
Social Hygiene and Health Management
Hygiene
Microbiology
Genetics
Laboratory Studies
Epidemiology
Medical Management

=== Military Medical Faculty ===
The Military Medical Faculty under the Ministry of Defence prepares professional military medical officers in the Azerbaijani Armed Forces. It was founded on 25 May 2000. The duration of study is 2 years. Since August 2000, the male alumni of the Medical University completing their fourth year have been selected for admission to this faculty. The cadets have been admitted to the 1st course of "military doctors" faculty of the Military Medical School since 2006.

== Affiliations ==
The university is a member of the Caucasus University Association. In the spring of 2017, the heads of the Azerbaijan Medical University (AMU) and Turkish Koç University signed a memorandum of cooperation. One of the main points of the memorandum was the consent to the exchange of doctors and residents.

== Hostels ==
There are 6 student dormitories at Azerbaijan Medical University. Two are for male students, two for female students, and the other two are designated for international students. The dormitories are equipped with study rooms, a library, and televisions with satellite antennas, providing access to international channels. Each floor of the dormitory buildings features lounges and guest rooms where students can meet with their visitors.

== See also ==
- Healthcare in Azerbaijan
- Ministry of Healthcare of Azerbaijan
- Medicine in Azerbaijan
