= Ministry of Healthcare (Azerbaijan) =

Government ministry of Azerbaijan

Ministry of Healthcare of Azerbaijan Republic
- Azərbaycan Respublikasının Səhiyyə Nazirliyi
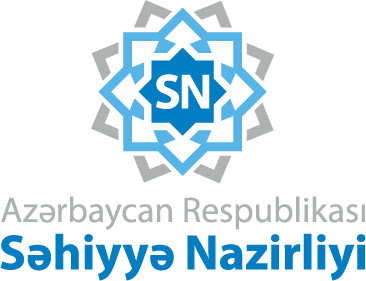

Agency overview
- Formed: June 17, 1918
- Jurisdiction: Government of Azerbaijan
- Headquarters: Baku city, AZ 1022 acad. M. Mirgasimov str. 1A
- Agency executive: Teymur Musayev, Minister of Healthcare
- Website: www.sehiyye.gov.az

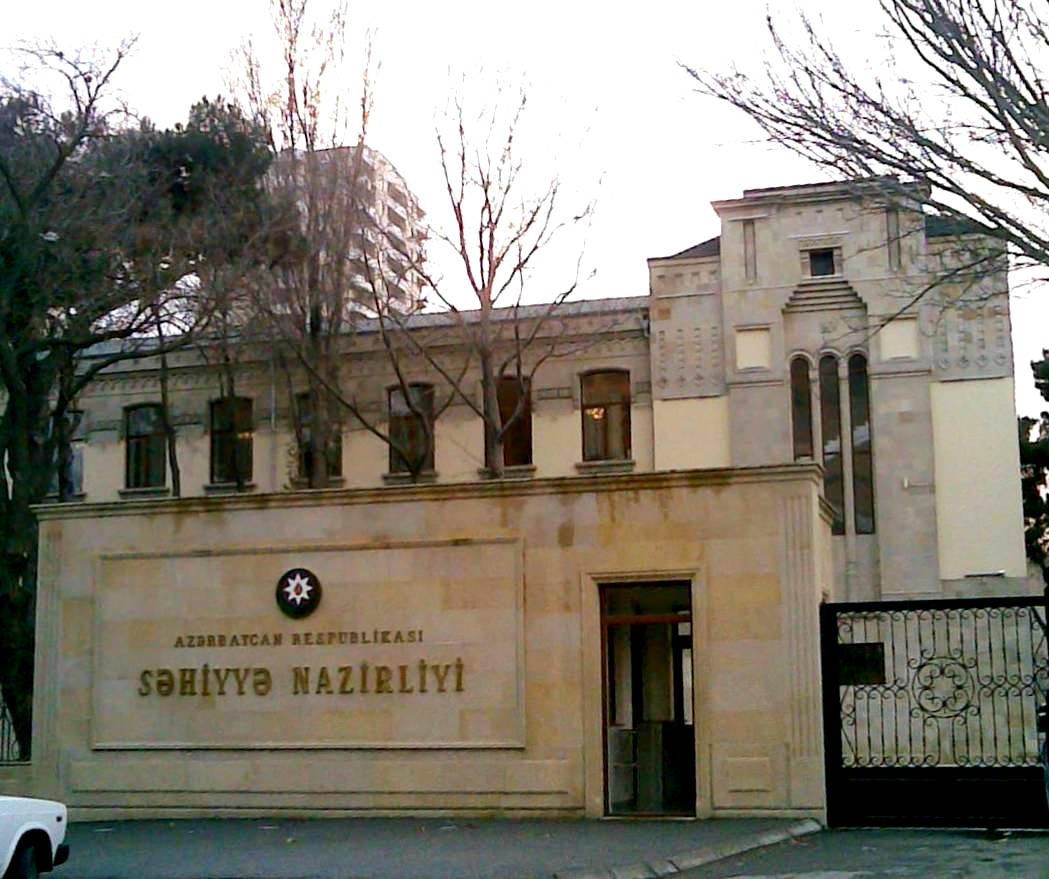
Ministry of Health of Azerbaijan Republic

The Ministry of Healthcare of Azerbaijan Republic, also known as the Ministry of Health of Azerbaijan Republic (Azerbaijani: Azərbaycan Respublikasının Səhiyyə Nazirliyi) is a governmental agency within the Cabinet of Azerbaijan in charge of regulating the healthcare system in Azerbaijan Republic. The ministry is headed by Teymur Musayev (interim).

== History ==
The Ministry of Healthcare was established on June 17, 1918, by the decree of Council of Ministers of Azerbaijan Democratic Republic led by Fatali Khan Khoyski. The first appointed minister was Khudadat Rafibeyli, who had graduated from Kharkov University in 1903 and was the most experienced surgeon in the country at the time. The ministry consisted of five departments, including the city healthcare department, healthcare statistics, therapy, rural healthcare, and veterinary offices. The medical care was provided to the population free of charge while the authorities built new hospitals, laboratories, medicine warehouses, and purchased medical equipment. Throughout the 23-month-long existence of Azerbaijan Democratic Republic, 33 hospitals operated in Azerbaijani provinces, with each having 1 doctor, 2 paramedics, 1 gynecologist, and one nurse conducting vaccinations. According to statistics, there was only one doctor per every 75,000 citizens. Due to the shortage, the Azerbaijani parliament included building of 35 new hospitals and 56 paramedical offices in the 1920 fiscal budget, committing AZN 43,321,950. During the Soviet rule of Azerbaijan, new hospitals and pharmacies were built. The State Pharmacy and Analytical Laboratories was established in Baku in order to prepare medicines, bacteriological drugs, syrups and investigate medical records during the issues relating to crime. In the 1960s-70s, the medical sector was enhanced, and new ambulance services opened for the public. The ministry today operates under a statute signed by President Heydar Aliyev on December 29, 1998.

== The statute of the Ministry of Health ==
The presidential decree was signed on May 25, 2006, by Azerbaijani president Ilham Aliyev and covers issues such as the structure and other issues relating with the Ministry of Health of Azerbaijan. The other two statutes accepted in 1998 and 2005 were invalidated after the acceptance of new statute numbered 413. In accordance with the statute, the structure of the ministry was submitted, and the staff of the chairmanship was defined as 87 people.

== Structure ==
Main functions of the ministry are organization and regulation of the healthcare system in the country to provide sufficient medical care to the population; preparation and implementation of state healthcare programs; conduct activities for improvement of services by medical companies in both the state and private sectors; regulation of sanitary-epidemiology stations in the country; preparation of programs on parenthood and family planning; provision of medical drugs, bacteriological and antivirus products to hospitals; regulations and development of pharmacy office networks; research and development of medical equipment manufacturing; prevention of dangerous diseases in the country; and so forth.

== International relations ==
In order of improvement of healthcare in the country, Ministry of Healthcare of Azerbaijan cooperates with a number of international organizations and shares experiences with foreign countries.

=== Rostrapovich-Vishnevskaya Foundation ===
During the years of 2010-2012, the Ministry of Healthcare of Azerbaijan cooperated with the Rostrapovich-Vishnevskaya Foundation. Parties signed an agreement on “Diagnosis of pregnant women against HepB and HIV viruses and prevention of newborn against HepB.” At the same time, the ministry organized an immunization campaign and vaccine program with the support of the foundation. As a result, indications of the diseases such as measles, mumps and parotid decreased in the country.

=== World Health Organization ===
Since 2006, the Ministry of Healthcare of Azerbaijan has been represented on the European Region’s Standing Committee of the Regional Committee and twice on WHO’s Executive Board. The 61st session of the WHO Regional Committee for Europe was held in Azerbaijan in 2011. During the meeting, public health experts and ministers of health from 53 countries signed an agreement relating to the public health problems and current health threats in European region. At the same time, Health 2020—a new European Health Policy Framework—was also discussed during the session and accepted as the Sustainable Development Agenda 2030. The country office of the World Health Organization in Azerbaijan was established in June 1994 in Baku. The office carries out implementation of WHO programs in the country with a staff consisting of six people.

Since 2006, Azerbaijan has started HIV treatment services in the country with the support of WHO. Current prior programs are carried out in the field of healthcare, such as, noncommunicable diseases, maternal and child health, health system strengthening, tuberculosis, immunization, and tobacco control.

=== Organization of Islamic Cooperation ===
The Ministry of Healthcare of Azerbaijan cooperates with the member countries of OIC and participates in sessions of ministries of health. The third Islamic Conference of Ministries of Health was held in Kazakhstan on September 29, 2011. The minister of healthcare, Oktay Shiraliyev, also participated in the three-day last session. Ministers of health from 53 member countries and representatives from international organizations participated in the meeting. During the session discussions were carried out relating to the developments and cooperative works between member countries, prevention of infectious and non-infectious diseases, and improving the potential of health workers and equipment.

== See also ==
- Cabinet of Azerbaijan
- Healthcare in Azerbaijan
- Azerbaijan State Medical University
- Institute of Cardiology of the Ministry of Health of Azerbaijan
