= List of universities in Azerbaijan =

This is a list of universities in Azerbaijan.

== Public ==
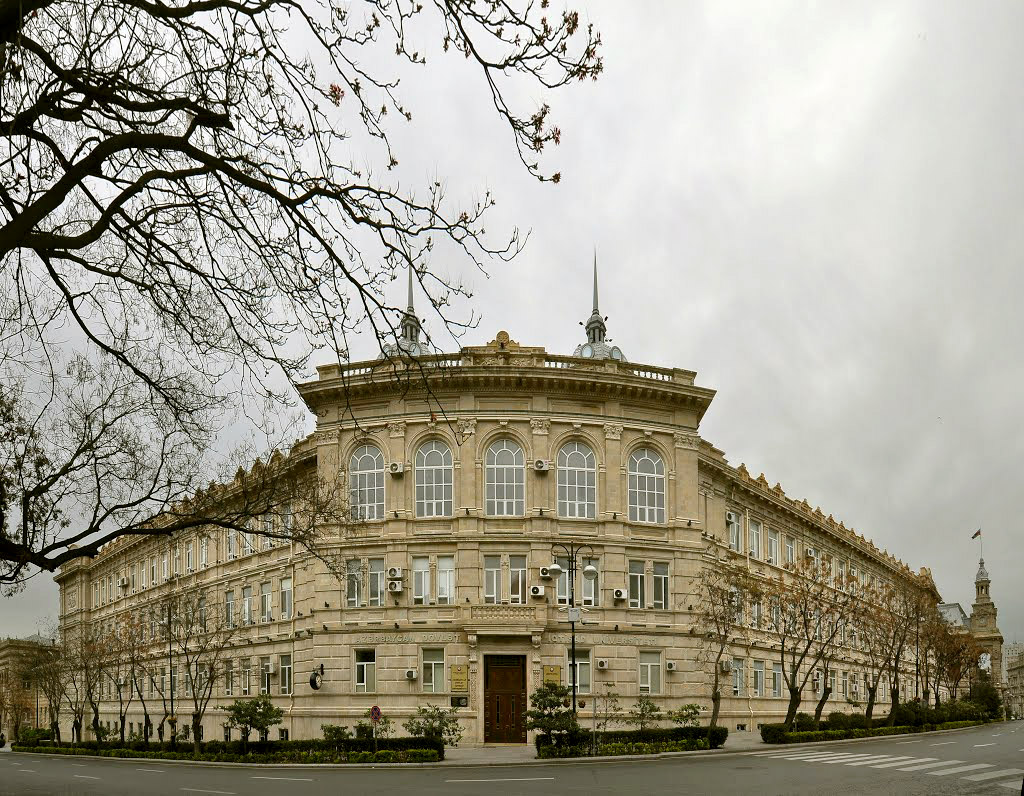
Building of Azerbaijan State Economic University in Istiglaliyyat Street

Building on the campus of Nakhchivan State University

Public universities under the Ministry of Science and Education
Universities	Established
Baku State University	1919
Azerbaijan State Oil and Industry University	1920
Azerbaijan Technical University	1950
Azerbaijan State Economic University	1930
Azerbaijan State Pedagogical University	1921
Azerbaijan Architecture and Construction University	1975
Baku Slavic University	1946
Azerbaijan University of Languages	1937
Baku Engineering University	2016
Baku Academy of Music	1920
Azerbaijan State University of Culture and Arts	1923
Sumqayit State University	1961
Lankaran State University	1991
Ganja State University	1938
Azerbaijan Technological University	1970
Karabakh University	2023
Mingachevir State University	2015
Nakhchivan State University	1967
Azerbaijan State Academy of Fine Arts	2002
National Conservatory of Azerbaijan	2000

Joint Universities in Azerbaijan
Universities	Established
French-Azerbaijani University	2016
Italy-Azerbaijan University	2022
Türkiye-Azerbaijan University	2024

Public universities under other state institutions
Universities	Established
Azerbaijan Medical University	1930
Azerbaijan State Physical Culture and Sports Academy	1930
Azerbaijan State Agricultural University	1929
Academy of Public Administration	1999
Azerbaijan State Marine Academy	1996
National Aviation Academy (Azerbaijan)	1992
ADA University	2006
Baku Higher Oil School	2011
Azerbaijan Tourism and Management University	2006
Baku Branch of Moscow State University named after M.V. Lomonosov	2008
Baku Branch of the First Moscow State Medical University named after I.M. Sechenov	2015
Baku Choreography Academy	2014
Theology Institute of Azerbaijan	2018

Special purpose higher educational institutions
Universities	Established
Azerbaijan Higher Military Academy	1939
Academy of the State Security Service	1998
Police Academy of the Ministry of Internal Affairs	1992
Higher Military School of the Internal Troops of the Ministry of Internal Affairs	1994
Academy of the State Border Service	2007
Academy of the Ministry of Emergency Situations	2008
Academy of the State Customs Committee	2012

== Private ==
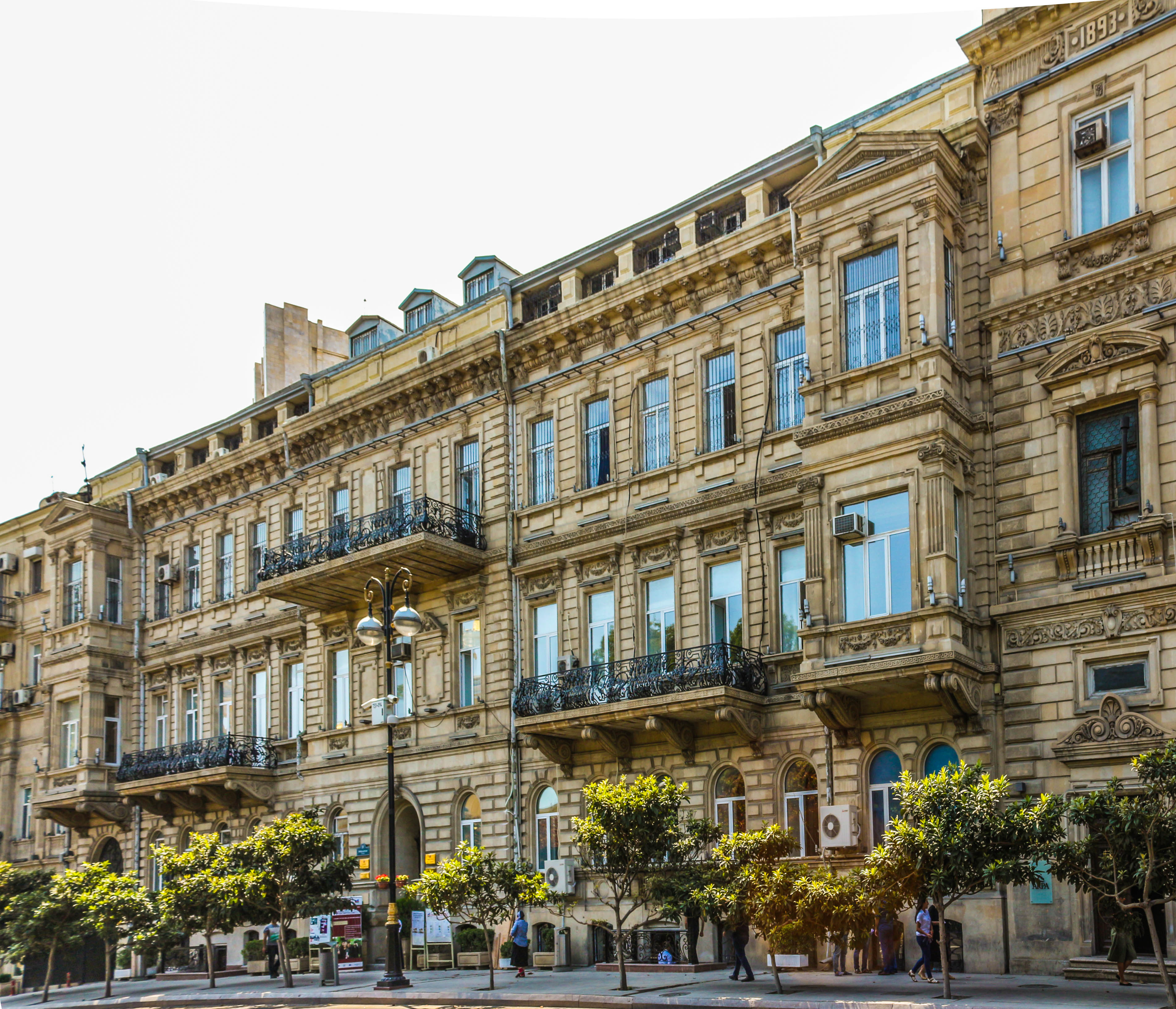
Western Caspian University in Baku

Private Universities
Universities	Established
Western Caspian University	1991
Azerbaijan University	1991
Khazar University	1991
Odlar Yurdu University	1995
Baku Eurasian University	1992
Baku Girls University	1992
Azerbaijan Cooperation University	1964
Baku Business University	1993
Nakhchivan University	1999
Azerbaijan Academy of Labor and Social Relations	2006

== See also ==
- Education in Azerbaijan
- Education in the Soviet Union (historical)
- List of universities in Baku
