= Black Sea Universities Network =

The Black Sea Universities Network (BSUN) began in 1998 as part of the Organization of the Black Sea Economic Cooperation. The goal of this merger is the mutual exchange of experience in research and teaching and mutual recognition of qualifications, promotion of the mobility of teachers and students and the utilisation of international programmes to promote student exchanges. The organisation is based in Constanța in Romania (2018). Pericles A. Mitkas has been President of BSUN since 2018. A current goal is to increase cooperation with the Balkan Universities Network.

== Presidents ==
Adrian Bavaru (Bucharest; 1998–2000), Suha Sevük (Ankara; 2000–2002), Abel Maharramov (Baku; 2002–2004), Ioan Bostan (Chișinău; 2004–2006), Stefan Barudov (Varna; 2006–2008), Mychailo Zgurovsky (Ukraine; 2008–2010), Dmitry Livanov (Moscow; 2010–2012), Jorgaq Kacani (Tirana; 2012–2014), Vladimir Bumbasirevic (Belgrade; 2014–2016) Giga Zedania (Tbilisi; 2016–2018), Pericles A. Mitkas (Thessaloniki; 2018–2020).

== Member universities ==
=== Albania ===
- University of Tirana
- Polytechnic University of Tirana
- Ismail Qemal Vlora Technological University

=== Armenia ===
- American University of Armenia
- National Polytechnic University of Armenia
- Yerevan State Medical University
- Yerevan Brusov State University of Languages and Social Sciences

=== Azerbaijan ===
- Azerbaijan Medical University
- Azerbaijan State Academy Of Physical Education And Sport
- Azerbaijan State Pedagogical University
- Azerbaijan State Agricultural University
- Azerbaidjan Institute of Technology
- Azerbaijan State Oil and Industry University
- Azerbaijan State University of Culture and Arts
- Baku State University
- Baku Engineering University
- Baku Academy of Music
- Baku Higher Oil School
- Baku Academy of Music
- Baku Eurasian University
- Nakhchivan State University
- Western Caspian University
- Qafqaz University

=== Bulgaria ===
- Assen-Slatarow-University Burgas
- Varna Free University
- Shumen University
- Medical University of Varna
- Technical University of Varna
- University of National and World Economy
- Sofia University
- Veliko Tarnovo University

=== Georgia ===
- Gori State Teaching University
- Tbilisi State University
- Georgian Technical University
- Ilia-Tschawtschawadse State Universität
- Tbilisi Public University Metekhi

=== Greece ===
- Aristotle University of Thessaloniki
- National and Kapodistrian University of Athens
- Athens University of Economics and Business
- University of Macedonia
- University of Ioannina
- Democritus University of Thrace
- University of Thessaly
- University of Patras

=== Moldova ===
- Comrat State University
- Technical University Moldova
- Moldova Akademy of Economics

=== Romania ===
- Gheorghe Asachi Technical University of Iași
- Lucian Blaga University of Sibiu
- Ovidius University
- University of Bacău
- Andrei Saguna University
- Mircea cel Bătrân Naval Academy
- Maritime University
- University of Galați
- Oil & Gas University of Ploiești
- Politehnica University of Bucharest
- Spiru Haret University
- Technical University of Cluj-Napoca
- University of Agricultural Sciences and Veterinary Medicine of Cluj-Napoca

=== Russia ===
- Kuban State University
- Kuban State Technological University
- National University of Science and Technology MISiS (Russia)
- South Russian State Polytechnical Institute
- Saratov State University
- Southern Federal University
- Astrakhan State University
- Peoples' Friendship University of Russia

=== Serbia ===
- University of Belgrade

=== Turkey ===
- Trakya University
- Dokuz Eylül University
- Galatasaray University
- Istanbul University
- Tekirdağ Namık Kemal University
- Fırat University
- Süleyman Demirel University
- Atatürk University
- Yozgat Bozok University
- Kırklareli University
- Çanakkale Onsekiz Mart University

=== Ukraine ===
- Alfred Nobel University
- Cherkasy National University
- Dnipro National University of Rail Transport
- Odesa National Academy of Food Technologies
- Odesa Maritime Academy
- K. D. Ushynsky South Ukrainian National Pedagogical University
- Poltava National Technical University
- Central Ukrainian Volodymyr Vynnychenko State Pedagogical University
- Prydniprovska State Academy of Civil Engineering and Architecture
- Ukrainian Academy of Banking of the National Bank of Ukraine
- National University of Kyiv-Mohyla Academy
- Kyiv National University of Trade and Economics
- Vinnytsia State Agrarian University
- Zaporizhzhia Polytechnic National University
- Zhytomyr State Technological University
- Dnipro State University of Internal Affairs
- Dnipro Polytechnic
- Kyiv National University of Technologies and Design
- National University of Food Technologies
