= List of universities in Baku =

This is a list of colleges and universities in Baku, Azerbaijan.

== List of the public and private higher education enterprises in Baku ==
Institute	Type	Official website	Year established	Student population (2011-2019)
Baku State University	Public	http://www.bsu.edu.az	1919	17,367
Azerbaijan State Economic University	Public	https://web.archive.org/web/20020109143211/http://www.aseu.ab.az/	1934	18,337
Azerbaijan State Oil Academy	Public	https://web.archive.org/web/20100310025134/http://adna.baku.az/	1920	7,051
Azerbaijan Medical University	Public	http://www.amu.edu.az	1930	5,428
Azerbaijan University of Languages	Public	http://www.adu.edu.az	1973	4,568
Academy of Public Administration	Public	http://www.dia.edu.az	1999	994
ADA University	Public	http://www.ada.edu.az	2006	2,324
Azerbaijan Tourism Institute	Public	http://www.tourism.edu.az	2006	1,442
Azerbaijan State Pedagogical University	Public	https://adpu.edu.az/	1921	8,757
Azerbaijan Technical University	Public	http://www.aztu.edu.az	1950	7,068
Azerbaijan Architecture and Construction University	Public		1975	5,187
Baku Slavic University	Public	http://bsu.edu.az/	1946	3,403
Azerbaijan Teachers' Institute	Public		-	1,344
Azerbaijan State University of Culture and Art	Public	http://www.admin.edu.az%5B%5D	1945	2,070
National Aviation Academy	Public		1992	2,276
Azerbaijan State Marine Academy	Public	https://web.archive.org/web/20100901103331/http://www.caspianagma.com/	1996	892
Azerbaijan State Academy of Physical Training and Sport	Public		-	3,654
Azerbaijan State Painting Academy	Public		-	828
Baku Music Academy	Public		1920	506
Theology Institute of Azerbaijan	Public		2018	
Azerbaijan National Conservatory	Public	http://www.conservatory.az	1921	246
Baku Engineering University	Public	http://beu.edu.az	2016	4,702
Khazar University	Private	http://www.khazar.org	1991	1,546
Western University	Private	http://www.wu.edu.az	1991	1,239
Odlar Yurdu University	Private	http://www.oyu.edu.az	1995	2,109
Azerbaijan University	Private	http://www.au.edu.az	1991	1,107
Azerbaijan Cooperation University	Private	https://web.archive.org/web/20030623215708/http://aku.gen.az/	1992	3,654
Baku Higher Oil School	Private	http://www.bhos.edu.az	2011	
Science and Education Center - Tafakkur University	Private		1995	1,077
Baku Girls University	Private	https://web.archive.org/web/20101103223807/http://www.bgu.az/	1992	762
Baku Business University	Private	http://www.bbu.edu.az	1993	1,174
Baku Eurasia University	Private	https://web.archive.org/web/20100915033602/http://baau.az/	1992	530
Baku Asia University	Private		-	271
Azerbaijan Public and Political University	Private		1991	614
Azerbaijan Academy of Labor and Social Relations	Private		-	661
Baku Islamic University	Private		-	1,286

== See also ==
- List of universities in Azerbaijan
- Education in Azerbaijan
- Education in the Soviet Union (Historical)
