= Education in Azerbaijan =

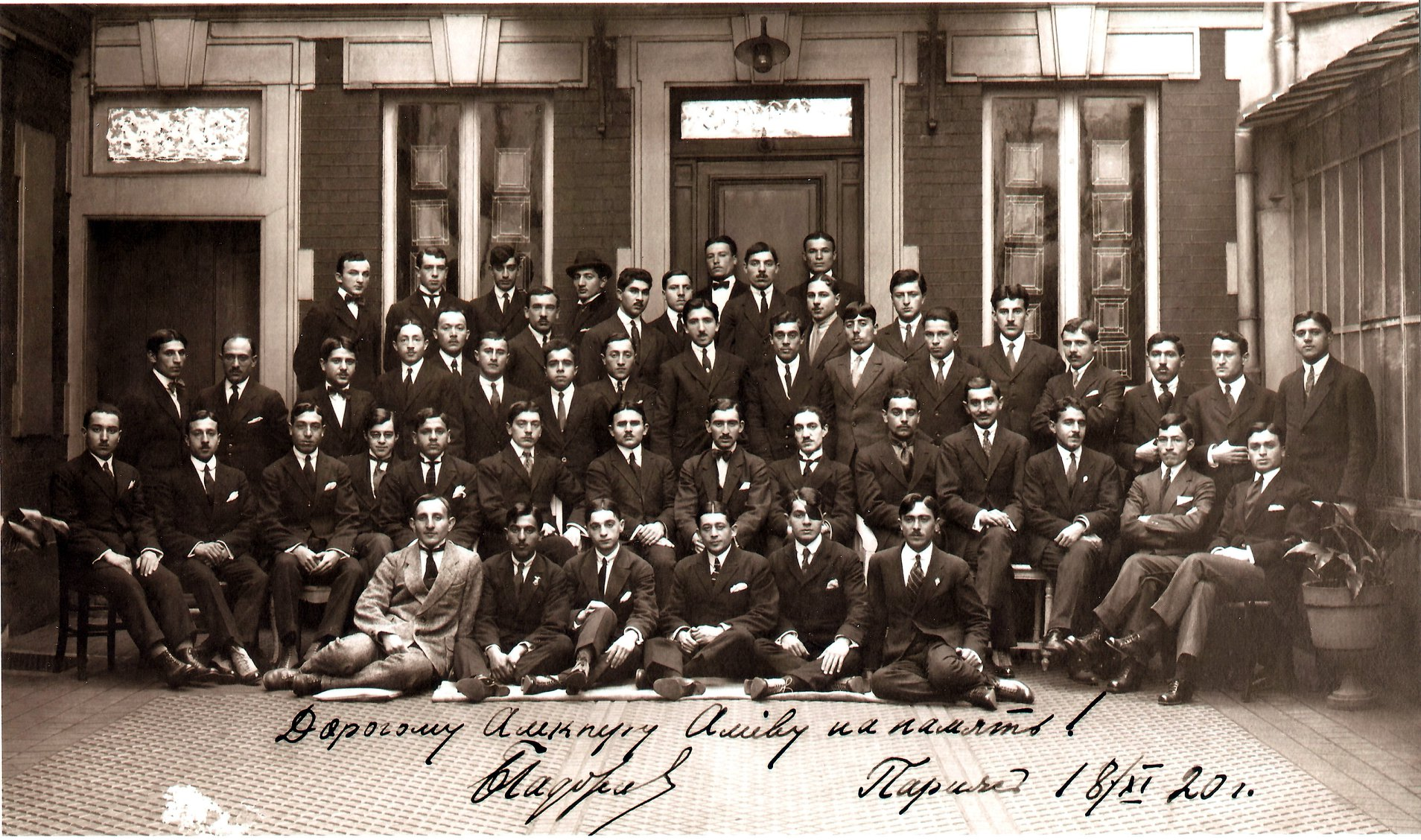
Azerbaijani students studying in Paris in 1920

Building of Baku Business University

Education in Azerbaijan is regulated by the Ministry of Science and Education of Azerbaijan.

The Human Rights Measurement Initiative (HRMI) finds that Azerbaijan is fulfilling only 85.6% of what it should be fulfilling for the right to education based on the country's level of income. HRMI breaks down the right to education by looking at the rights to both primary education and secondary education. While taking into consideration Azerbaijan's income level, the nation is achieving 81.0% of what should be possible based on its resources (income) for primary education and 90.3% for secondary education.

== History ==
In the pre-Soviet period, Azerbaijani education included Islamic religious training that commenced in early childhood. Beginning at roughly age five and sometimes continuing until age twenty, children attended madrasahs, education institutions affiliated with mosques. In the seventeenth and eighteenth centuries, madrasahs were established as separate education institutions in major cities, but the religious component of education remained significant. In 1865, the first technical high school and the first women's high school were opened in Baku. In the late nineteenth century, secular elementary schools for Azerbaijanis began to appear (schools for ethnic Russians had been established earlier), but institutions of higher education and the use of the Azerbaijani language in secondary schools were forbidden in Transcaucasia throughout the tsarist period. The majority of ethnic Azerbaijani children received no education in this period, and the Azerbaijani literacy rate remained very low, especially among women. Few women were allowed to attend school.

In the Soviet era, literacy and average education levels rose dramatically from their very low starting point, despite two changes in the script, from Arabic to Latin in the 1920s and from Latin to Cyrillic in the 1930s. According to Soviet data, 100 percent of males and females (ages nine to forty-nine) were literate in 1970. According to the United Nations Development Program Report 2009, the literacy rate in Azerbaijan is 99.5 percent.

During the Soviet period, the Azerbaijani education system was based on the standard model imposed by Moscow, which featured state control of all education institutions and heavy doses of Marxist–Leninist ideology at all levels.

Since independence, one of the first laws that Azerbaijan's Parliament passed was to adopt a modified-Latin alphabet to replace Cyrillic. Other than that, the Azerbaijani system has undergone little structural change. Initial alterations have included the reestablishment of religious education (banned during the Soviet period) and curriculum changes that have reemphasized the use of the Azerbaijani language and have eliminated ideological content. In addition to elementary schools, the education institutions include thousands of preschools, general secondary schools, and vocational schools, including specialized secondary schools and technical schools. Education through the ninth grade is compulsory. At the end of the Soviet period, about 18 percent of instruction was in Russian, but the use of Russian began a steady decline beginning in 1988. Today English and Russian are taught as second or third languages.

== Education system in the Republic of Azerbaijan ==
Education in Azerbaijan is regarded as an area of activity that constitutes the basis for the development of the society and the state, which has a strategic precaution and superiority. In the Republic of Azerbaijan, the educational system has a democratic, secular character and its basis is national and international values. All citizens are entitled to 9 years of compulsory general education. The right to education is the fundamental right of citizens of the Republic of Azerbaijan. This was established in the Constitution of the Republic of Azerbaijan and in the Education Law of the Republic of Azerbaijan.

Article 42 of the Constitution of the Republic of Azerbaijan states that the right of citizens to be educated is determined as follows:

- Every citizen has the right to education;
- The state grants free compulsory general secondary education;
- The state controls the education system;
- The State guarantees the education of talented persons without regard to their material condition;
- The government sets minimum educational standards;
- Everyone has the right to education in the framework of the state standard;
- It is guaranteed that all citizens have the right to education in Azerbaijan irrespective of differences such as nationality, religion, race, language, sex, age, health and social status, activity area, place of residence and political views.

Education is free and compulsory for children between the ages of six and fifteen. Basic schooling is divided into three: primary education, general secondary and full secondary education.

=== Language ===
Azerbaijani is the main language of education in the schools of the Republic of Azerbaijan, and Azerbaijani is the official language of the country. There are, however, many schools that offer the whole 9 years of general education, 3 years of higher education, and a bachelor's degree in Russian. The languages offered are not limited to Russian only: there are branches of well-known schools and foundations, e.g. British School, EF English First, which offer the English language-based education for both foreigners and expats in the country and the local people, for 9–11 years of the general education, although the majority of these schools have higher than average tuition costs in comparison with the local educational establishments mainly due to being private organizations and schools.

For bachelor's degree, the choice gets wider: the three major languages (Azerbaijani, Russian and English) as a medium of instruction are still there, however, for those who plan to take regional studies courses, the classes are offered in languages corresponding to their study of the country e.g. Japanese studies and culture students must take Japanese language course without exception for some classes, summer schools and internships may require higher knowledge of the language.

Undergraduate courses tend to be taught in English, especially at newly founded or popular universities, e.g. ADA University, Baku Higher Oil School, Baku Engineering University (former Baku Engineering University). Along with this, traditional and old universities, e.g. Baku State University, Azerbaijan University of Languages and other establishments offer not only arts and humanities but also social science courses, mainly in English.

== Pillars of Education ==
=== Primary Education ===
Primary education starts with one year of pre-primary school training. Before pre-school training the majority of children already know the basics of understanding from their kindergarten experience. So pre-school training is mainly to develop kids' comprehension, nature, taste and understanding of surrounding elements. Some children acquire writing and reading skills during this period as well. However, it differs from child to child and their skills, mainly.

Primary school itself starts at the age of six and lasts four years, 1–4 classes. At the age of 10, students take an exam and pass to what is called in the western system "middle school". The majority of the population attend public schools for primary education. However, there are many private schools to choose from and attend, too.

=== General Secondary Education ===
This stage of education is equal to the western system of middle school and covers 5-9th grades. General secondary education is also free in public schools. In this period, students get deeper knowledge about literature, math, languages, history, culture, sports, science, arts etc. At the end of general secondary education, they take an exam to get the full secondary education.

=== Full Secondary Education ===
Full secondary education covers 10th, and 11th grades and is also free in public schools Azerbaijan offers. At this stage, students already choose their choice of future profession and prepare for entrance exams that take place every year in summer. This is considered to be the most vulnerable period of studentship, mainly due to the stress level caused by the entrance exam competition to score higher and to get full scholarships from the government to pay for their tuition fees among students.

== Entrance exam ==
The entrance exam is the official governmental exam entrants take to get into universities every summer in different regions of Azerbaijan. The exam was administered once a year until 2017. Now, the exam is offered twice a year. The first exam is always free to all students who wish to take the exam, but the second exam costs 40₼ ($23.5 as of October 5, 2020). The maximum score is 700. Students are required to answer 30 questions from each subject according to the group they choose, making it overall 3 subjects for each profession group. There are overall 4 main groups of profession and one extra (5th group) for those who plan to attend fields that require a certain skill. The government exempts those who score higher from tuition fees.

== Diplomas and Certificates ==
Graduates who have completed their education and have successfully completed the examinations and diplomas are presented with a uniform state document certifying their profession and their degree. The training document is the basis for starting work and moving to the new step. Documents related to the education presented are certificate scholarship, diploma, professional master diploma, diploma, bachelor's, master's and doctoral diploma over the "junior expert" category, a certificate for increasing specialization, diploma related to re-training.

=== Education programs ===
In Azerbaijan, the education system consists of graduated educational programs, educational institution networks, the governing bodies of the education system, and other institutions dealing with education and training. Management, as part of the function of an excellent system with various characteristics, ensures that some of its structures are preserved, the regime of operation, the program, and its objectives are carried out successfully. A system of government agencies and community self-governing bodies is being established to manage education. These organizations operate within the framework of competence set out in the education legislation and are in undertakings with non-binding laws. Educational administration The Education Act is balanced by the rules and programs of appropriate legislation and educational institutions and is based on international experience. The Government of the Republic of Azerbaijan, the Ministry of Education, and the local educational institutions are the main subjects of the administration of the education system. Local government agencies, related scientific-pedagogical communities, professional-creativity associations, societies, socio-political institutions, and societies participate in the management of educational institutions. In the management process, the Ministry of Education's mission can be generalized to the following aspects: Identification of the most important problems in the education system, as well as the degree of importance of their resolution, as well as the assessment of the environment surrounding them for analysis and prediction; ensuring that the system is legally documented so that the process is carried out regularly and the quality is improved; The analysis and estimation is carried out, the results are presented to the group of officers who receive the decision; The preparation and realization of the national strategic program related to education and the organization of national education standards; Statistical and forecasting and monitoring of included indicators; to make methodical services, to ensure that everyone enjoys them; Establishment and development of continuous relations with other sectors and states;

Introducing all kinds of assistance to local education branches and educational institutions, new ideas and proposals put forward about their education plans and programs, textbooks, and the strategy of educational materials; Making innovation experiences and ensuring positive results, their support, and wide-ranging implementation; Gathering information about the entire system, setting up private data banks, identifying deviations and eliminating them in the short run; provision of financing of the education sector (private and state); Taking effective measures to make investments in the system; social defense of the education system associates; Citizens are crammed for uninterrupted education, the elderly are being educated, the right to educate everyone; the application of principles and procedures and other contemporary mechanisms of decentralization in the administration; Continual improvement of the infrastructure of educational institutions, meeting all kinds of needs. Studies conducted in the ministry serve the following purposes: The responsibilities and objectives of the Ministry of Education, local education branches, educational institutions, parents, community, private sector, government, and non-governmental organizations (within the scope of the priority of the country's education system in the area of stock and production objects) Supported; Establishing a mutual relationship between the participants of the various stages of the education system and raising the level of participation according to them, improving the qualifications and improving the relations between the prospective officers and their overseas colleagues; Providing appropriate management, infrastructure, and technical facilities for the fulfillment of essential tasks in the education system; censorship of various colleagues from foreign countries for the implementation of recent innovations and the resulting developed experience; continuous assistance to the development of the education system through the strengthening of the knowledge base, analysis systems, liaison channels and development mechanism; Establishment of supportive opportunities and learning of developmental problems; Mobilization of all possibilities to reach the ultimate goals. The ministry's advisory bodies - the executive board of the Ministry, the Rectors' Council, and the pedagogical publications participate in the management of the education system. Scientific-Methodical Central Responsible for the Ministry's Educational Problems Provides educational and methodological guarantees of the central schools. Azerbaijan Scientific Research Institute of Pedagogical Sciences is operating. This institute plays a major role in the field of education improvement, renovation, and is doing basic research in the field of pedagogical sciences. There are "Education Councils" at local educational institutions and branches and scientific and pedagogical councils at educational institutions.

== Schools ==
There are currently 61 higher education institutions including universities in Baku and in the regions.

=== Public Schools ===
Public schools offer 11 years of education including primary, general secondary, and full secondary education starting from the age of 6 to 17 (sometimes 18). The government of Azerbaijan provides all public schools with the necessary textbooks, all free of charge. The medium of instruction is Azerbaijani, however, due to Soviet influence, there are still many public schools offering Russian as a medium of instruction.

=== Private Schools ===
There is a wide choice for both expats and locals if they would like their children to attend private schools: Turkish lyceums and international schools are the most opt among all private institutions. Turkish lyceums have been the most favored private schools since Azerbaijan gained independence in 1991, however, recently due to some organizational issues the number of Turkish lyceums has decreased significantly, or they operate under different names. There are, however, still a lot of Turkish schools operating in Baku and the regions.

Unfortunately, due to language barriers, expats are not able to benefit from public schools Azerbaijan offers. However, there is a wide choice of branches of international schools that can be attended in Baku and the regions.

=== Vocational Schools ===
Vocational schools can start from the 9th and 11th grade and last three to four years. These schools teach skills to students.

== Universities ==
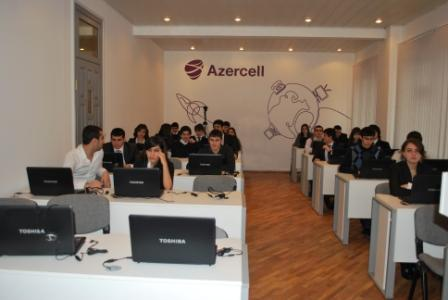
E-Learning Room at Khazar University

There are 38 state-run and 11 private universities in Azerbaijan. The ministry-released reports state that in 2016, 34224 students entered the universities. Universities employ 11,566 professors and 12,616 faculty members in the country. Because Azerbaijani culture has always included great respect for secular learning, the country traditionally has been an education center for the Muslim peoples of the former Soviet Union. For that reason and because of the role of the oil industry in Azerbaijan's economy, a relatively high percentage of Azerbaijanis have obtained some form of higher education, most notably in scientific and technical subjects. Several vocational institutes train technicians for the oil industry and other primary industries.

The most popular institutions of higher education are the ADA University, Baku State University, Azerbaijan State Oil Academy (ASOA), Baku Higher Oil School, Baku Engineering University, (former Qafqaz University), Khazar University, Azerbaijan Tourism and Management University, Azerbaijan Technical University, Azerbaijan State Pedagogical University, Azerbaijan University of Languages, Azerbaijan Medical University, Uzeyir Hajibayov Baku Academy of Music. Much scientific research, which during the Soviet period dealt mainly with enhancing oil production and refining, is carried out by Azerbaijan National Academy of Sciences, which was established in 1945.

Baku State University (the University of Azerbaijan, established in 1919) includes more than a dozen departments, ranging from physics to Oriental studies, and has the largest library in Azerbaijan. The student population numbers more than 11,000, and the faculty over 600. The Institute of Petroleum and Chemistry, established in 1920, has more than 15,000 students and a faculty of about 1,000. The institute trains engineers and scientists in the petrochemical industry, geology, and related areas.

Additionally, there is scientific research about the determinants of academic performance (measured in GPA) of Azerbaijanis students, which implies that the gender factor is crucial as a determinant of academic achievements such that the female students significantly overshadow male ones in terms of grading scores.

== Educational reforms ==
Since gaining independence, Azerbaijan has worked on the restoration, improvement, and development of general education. A number of programmes and projects have been implemented to make educational reforms. In this regard, a joint project was planned with the World Bank - Second Education Sector Development Project (2009-2016) which includes supporting the implementation of the general education curriculum and further curriculum reforms to successfully engage teachers, students, and education managers in the realization of the new general education curriculum, and to develop new learning materials and school libraries, modernizing in-service teacher training to support the education reform, building on the institutional framework supported by APL 1, using student assessment for education quality improvement to build up a new evaluation and assessment culture in Azerbaijan.

In order to allow the schools to select and order the books that they need, 1200 issues of the catalogue of available learning and reading materials were printed and sent to 500 schools. 31 organizations provided the 452 titles of books, totaling 549,000 issues. They are being delivered to 500 school libraries in accordance with the submitted orders. In addition, catalogue covers yearly cards (total 784 cards for “Azerbaijani language”, “Computer sciences”, “Mathematics”, “Life skill” subjects) for fee-based website www.e-tehsil.com which were delivered to 196 general schools having access to internet.

Trainers were trained by the support of the UNICEF on the implementation of general education curriculum, including:

- implementation of the new primary education curriculum involved 148 trainers for the training of primary grade teachers

- general education curriculum reforms and management involved 150 trainers for the training of education managers

- implementation of the new general secondary education curriculum involved 925 trainers for the training of subject teachers.

Daily information and photos regarding the educational issues became available at a website of the MoE. In addition, regular interviews were arranged in TV channels. Besides, periodical articles were published in the “Azərbaycan Müəllimi” (teacher of Azerbaijan) newspaper. In terms of reforms under SESDP, 14 enlightening commercial films were prepared and broadcast on “Ictimai” TV. The ongoing reforms were discussed in most releases of Open Lesson talk show.

UNICEF's support to Azerbaijan in the implementation of educational reforms was reflected in a UNICEF's annual report on Azerbaijan (2015). According to the report, UNICEF assisted the Azerbaijani government to launch the first inclusive school. Professionals and teachers were trained on a model of special education. In this manner, the German model of inclusive education was started to be applied in accordance with the offer of the UNICEF.

In addition, the Teacher Training Institute introduced an innovative training programme for teachers called TEMEL (Foundation). This institute supported the implementation of a strategy on developing the teaching capacity of primary teachers from 352 schools. In 2015, the government launched structural reforms to efficiently involve children with disabilities in education.

A five-year plan was made to establish an education system meeting education and development needs of all children.

The following reforms implemented by the Azerbaijani government in 2016 in different fields of education must be particularly noted:

- More than 76,000 children were involved in the pre-school education groups in Azerbaijan in 2016-2017
- Trainings were organized for directors of the general schools and pedagogical staff members who aim to work as directors in the future. The trainings were held for the pedagogical staff of the general schools in Ganja, Goygol, Samukh, Goranboy and Dashkesen. The trainings aimed to educate and improve the school directors who have modern management knowledge and skills, are familiar with information technologies and can contribute to the educational and social development of the country.
- Last year 29 new schools were put into use in Azerbaijan, as well as 7 schools. 101 schools were fully renovated and 384 are currently renovated. Construction of 10 educational institutions is in progress.
- The public opinion was studied on fully improved 1st and 5th-grade textbooks which were started in February 2016, as well as newly established 9th grade textbook projects. The opinions and suggestions on the textbook projects were received through the e-resurs.edu.az website of the MoE and derslik@edu.gov.az email address. Generally, 77 textbook projects were uploaded to the website. 1544 opinions and suggestions were obtained. 91% of opinions pertain to 9th grade, 6% to 5th grade, and 3% to 1st-grade textbooks.
- The number of newly prepared e-books reached 156 from 143 in the www.e-derslik.edu.az e-textbook portal.
- The French-Azerbaijani University (UFAZ) started an academic year. 303 students, who scored 500 and over 500 in a university entrance exam of 1st groups, registered at the Azerbaijan State Oil and Industrial University. 120 of them were admitted with the state order and 40 paid their tuition fees at the UFAZ.

== Bologna Process ==
The Bologna Process which has been created by the European Higher Education Area under the Lisbon Recognition Convention is based on cooperation between public authorities, universities, teachers, students, and staff from 46 countries.

Azerbaijan is a full member of the Bologna Process/European higher education area since 2005. Joining the Bologna process, Azerbaijan began education reforms in order to get higher education meeting the common European standards. In 2005, an Action Plan covering the period 2006-2010 was approved for the implementation of the Bologna Declaration. The process began to be implemented on certain specialties in several higher educational institutions since 2006. But now the process is implemented in all higher education institutions in Azerbaijan.

The main requirement of the Bologna Process is to organize the educational process in accordance with the European credit transfer system. This system also allows students to continue their education at other institutions of higher learning, and thus allows students to increase competitiveness on a labor market.

In order to accelerate the integration of the higher education system in the European Space of the Higher Education, ensure mutual recognition of diplomas, and developments of student's and teaching mobility, the Cabinet of Ministries of Azerbaijan approved a resolution dated December 24, 2013, No348 on "Rules of the organization of educating on credit system at levels of a bachelor degree and a magistracy of higher educational institutions".

According to the rules, students are not excluded from the university for academic failure. If the student does not collect the required number of credits through its specialty for a specific period of time, then in subsequent years to collecting these loans, it makes no annual fee.

At an assessment of knowledge of students, the minimum acceptable indicator of the points gained at examination is 17 points, as a whole by a subject of 51 points.

As a result of the reforms which have been carried out in the field of higher education, all higher educational institutions received financial autonomy.

On July 3–4, 2013 an international conference organized by the Azerbaijan Student Youth Organizations' Union (ASYOU) on “Bologna process and Azerbaijan” was held in Baku. The conference that was attended by the delegations from Lithuania, Serbia, Ukraine Luxemburg and Belgium, focused on Azerbaijan's achievements in the educational system and prospects for further development.

== Chevening Scholarship ==
UK government's global scholarship program Chevening Scholarship is funded by the Foreign and Commonwealth Office (FCO) and partner organizations.

Every year, the Ministry of Foreign Affairs of Great Britain creates a unique opportunity for candidates from all over the world to get a master's degree in the UK. All students from all nationalities except those from the EU and USA may apply for the Chevening Scholarship.

Chevening awards include full overseas tuition fees, stipend for living costs, air-fares, and a variety of other study-related expenses. The Scholarship also offers the opportunity of becoming part of the highly regarded and influential Chevening global network.

Azerbaijani students benefit Chevening program since 1994–1995. In the academic years of 2016-2017, this program allocated scholarship to three representatives from Azerbaijan. Each year this number increases depending on the budget.

== Fulbright Scholar Program ==
Through the Fulbright Scholar Program, Azerbaijani students get an opportunity to continue their education via master's degree studies in the US universities.

Under this program, all disciplines and academic fields of study are available. Applicants should be of Azerbaijani citizenship, have a university degree and English language proficiency (minimum 85 IBT TOEFL/7 IELTS score), availability of military service certificate, or proof of military service deferment for actual inductees.

== See also ==
- Ministry of Education of Azerbaijan Republic
- List of universities in Azerbaijan
  - List of universities in Baku
- Khazar university
- Education in the Soviet Union (Historical)
