= Vugar Iskandarov =

Azerbaijani politician

Member of the 7th National Assembly of Azerbaijan

Personal details
- Born: December 30, 1972 (age 53) Azerbaijan Shaki
- Party: New Azerbaijan Party
- Education: Azerbaijan State Agricultural University

Vugar Iskandarov (Azerbaijani: İskəndərov Vüqar Yapon oğlu, born 30 December 1972) is a deputy of the 7th convocation of the National Assembly of the Republic of Azerbaijan.

== Early life and career ==
Vugar Iskandarov was born on December 30, 1972, in Shaki, Republic of Azerbaijan. In 1996, he began his studies at the Faculty of Law of the Georgian Scientific and Educational Institute, graduating in 2001 with a qualification in law.

He was elected to the 7th convocation of the Milli Majlis on 1 September, representing the Shaki Urban Constituency No. 114. He is a member of the New Azerbaijan Party.

Iskandarov is married and has two children.

== See also ==
- Mushfiq Mammadli
- Eldar Guliyev
