= Xpert =

Azerbaijani musician

- Also known as: XXXpert
- Born: Shahriyar Atababayev; 30 September 1990 (age 35); Baku, Azerbaijan SSR, Soviet Union
- Origin: Azerbaijani
- Genres: Hip hop
- Occupations: Rapper, songwriter, poet
- Years active: 2009–present
- Labels: Synaps Production; 101 Moon Ave

Shahriyar Atababayev (Azerbaijani: Şəhriyar Zahid oğlu Atababayev), better known by his stage name Xpert, is an Azerbaijani rapper, songwriter, and poet.

== Life ==
Shahriyar Zahid Oglu Atababayev was born on 30 September 1990 in Baku. In 1996 he entered secondary school No. 292 and graduated from the school in 2007. In 2007 he entered the Faculty of Turkish language and literature of Qafqaz University, and in 2012 he entered the magistracy and graduated from it. He is married and has a daughter named Mary.

== Biography ==
Shahriyar Atababayev was born in September 1990 in Baku, Azerbaijan.

He graduated from the Faculty of Turkish Language and Literature (Qafqaz University) in 2011 with a bachelor's degree and in 2014 with a master's degree.

Shahriyar met the rapper and producer nicknamed A4 and started his rap career in 2009.

Xpert is one of the founders of Synaps Production. Azerbaijan's most famous rap company.

He worked with many local and foreign artists as a musician, producer and director.

He is currently the CEO of the record label "101".

== Discography ==
=== Singles ===
- Sudan (2014)
- Və bir də (2015)
- Xənnas (2017)
- MALCOM (2017)
- RAFAEL AGAYEV (2018)
- ESHELEME (2018
- PHENOM (2019)
- Limuzin (2019)
- XXX (2020)
- 100K (2020)
- AYDIN (2020)
- CHEKDERD (2020)
- TAPOR (2020)
- TRASHMAN (2020)
- NARSOCU (2020)
- SKUSKU RAAT (2020)
- A4TB (2020)
- LOREM IPSUM (2020)
- ROLEX (2020)
- MAUPASSANT (2020)
- HEAVEN (2020)
- Just Business (2020)
- FAKFREYMZ (2020)
- MNML (2021)
- GZLN (2021)
- COSMO (2021)
- CAPUNA (2021)
- HUEMAY (2021)

=== Albums ===
==== Solo albums ====
- Makar10 (2011)
- Akula (2013)
- Qassab (2016)

==== Compilation albums ====
- Qanun Beatz "Maddə 1 The Mixtape"
- Rapsychology bootleg

==== EPs ====
- Sarkoma
- La Poax(2013)
- 7EDDI
