= Nino Doborjginidze =

Georgian philologist and academic (born 1960)

- ნინო დობორჯგინიძე

Rector of the Ilia State University
- Incumbent
- Assumed office 24 March 2022
- Preceded by: Giga Zedania

Personal details
- Born: 21 March 1960 (age 66)
- Education: Tbilisi State University

Nino Doborjginidze (Georgian: ნინო დობორჯგინიძე; born 21 March 1960) is a Georgian philogist and academic. She has been rector of the Ilia State University since 2022.

== Early life and education ==
Doborjginidze was born on 21 March 1960. She graduated in 1982 with a degree in classical philology from Tbilisi State University and obtained her PhD in linguistics in 1988.

== Career ==
Between 1982 and 2006, she worked at the Orion Manuscripts research laboratory of the Department of Ancient Georgian Language at Tbilisi State University, and between 1996 and 2000, she was a visiting researcher at the University of Göttingen and the Academy of Sciences of Göttingen. For several years between 2000 and 2015, Doborjginidze was a member of the Alexander von Humboldt Foundation and worked at the universities of Göttingen and Oldenburg.

Doborjginidze began working at Ilia State University in 2006, serving as an associate professor of language and literature until 2010 and as a full professor since that year. Between 2017 and 2021, she was the university's Vice-Rector. She also heads the Institute of Linguistic Studies and, until 2022, served as the Rector’s Advisor for Research and Teaching.

On 11 March 2022, the Academic Council of Ilia State University unanimously elected Doborjginidze as the university’s new rector, and she took up her post on 24 March. In October 2025, she criticised Prime Minister Irakli Kobakhidze’s proposal for university reform, which involves a change in the funding model and a reduction in the number of faculties, stating that “A university is not just buildings, especially buildings that can be sold for profit. A university is the most important place of memory“. In December of that year, Doborjginidze criticised the ‘one city, one faculty’ model, pointing out that it would lead to a "catastrophic" rise in the cost of living for students and would result in the abolition of duplicate educational programmes and competition. She was re-elected on 2 February 2026.

== Books ==
- Figurative Discourse on Translation in Medieval Georgia: A Sociocultural Perspective (2026)
- Establishing Guidelines for MLU Measurement in an Agglutinating Language: An Illustration of Georgian (2024)
- Medieval Translation in the Light of the Polysystem and Rewriting Theories the Georgian Case (2021)
- The Epigraphic Corpus of Georgia (2017)
