= Türkiye-Azerbaijan University =

University in Baku

- Type: Joint university
- Established: 2024
- Parent institution: Azerbaijan Technical University; Middle East Technical University; Istanbul Technical University; Hacettepe University
- Rector: Vilayet Valiyev
- Location: Baku, Azerbaijan; 40.38010°N 49.87257°E
- Campus: Urban
- Location in Baku, Azerbaijan Türkiye-Azerbaijan University (Azerbaijan) Türkiye-Azerbaijan University (Caucasus Mountains)

Türkiye-Azerbaijan University is a higher education institution established in 2024 through a partnership between Azerbaijan Technical University and Turkish institutions, including Middle East Technical University, Istanbul Technical University, and Hacettepe University.

== History ==
The establishment of Turkiye-Azerbaijan University was formalized on February 19, 2024, in Ankara, through a Memorandum of Understanding signed by Azerbaijan’s Ministry of Science and Education and Türkiye's Higher Education Council (YÖK), with Presidents Recep Tayyip Erdoğan and Ilham Aliyev overseeing the agreement.

TAÜ's first cohort consisted of 86 students enrolled in programs such as computer engineering (supported by Middle East Technical University), industrial engineering (supported by Istanbul Technical University), and food engineering (supported by Hacettepe University). The university aims to prepare professionals in strategic fields by leveraging the scientific expertise of both Azerbaijan and Turkey. It offers associate, undergraduate, and graduate programs in collaboration with notable Turkish institutions, with a focus on attracting international students.

== Education ==
Turkiye-Azerbaijan University (TAÜ) operates from the Baku Higher Oil School (BHOS) building, located on Khojaly Avenue in the Khatai district of Baku. The building formerly housed BHOS before the university's establishment. The university's administrative and financial matters are overseen by Azerbaijan, while academic affairs are managed by Turkey. A budget of 10 million manat has been allocated to support the university’s operations.

Initially, the university’s educational offerings are focused on Azerbaijani citizens, with plans to admit 90 students for the first academic year. Future enrollment is expected to increase by 100–200 students annually. Education at TAÜ is provided free of charge, with teaching conducted in English and Turkish. The university operates in partnership with Azerbaijan Technical University and engages faculty members from Istanbul Technical University, Middle East Technical University, and Hacettepe University, who visit regularly to conduct classes.

== Programs ==
- Food engineering
- Industrial engineering
- Computer engineering

== See also ==
- Azerbaijan Technical University
- Azerbaijan–Turkey relations
