= Ilham Madatov =

Azerbaijani politician (born 1952)

Ilham Isa Madatov
- Born: November 13, 1952 (age 73); Yevlakh, Azerbaijan
- Known for: Politician

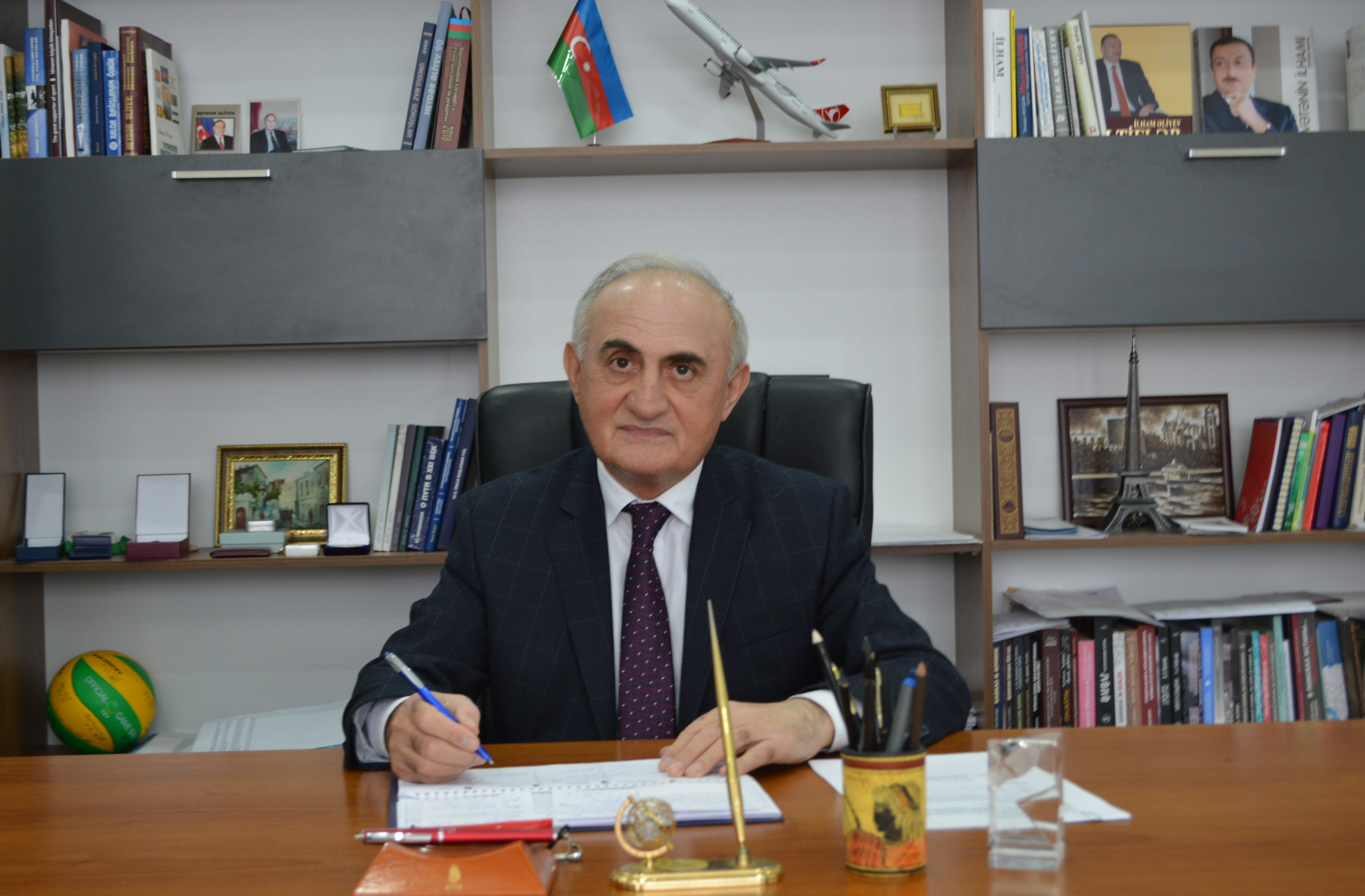
Ilham Madatov

Ilham Isa oglu Madatov (Azerbaijani: İlham İsa oğlu Mədətov, born 13 November 1952) currently serving as Rector of Azerbaijan Tourism and Management University.

== Early life and educational background ==
Ilham Madatov was born on November 13, 1952, in Yevlakh, Azerbaijan. Ilham Madatov finished secondary school №4 with a gold medal in Yevlakh City, in 1970. He graduated from the Faculty of Orientalism as an interpreter (translator) of the Arabic language from the Azerbaijan State University in 1976. From July 1974 until July 1975, he worked as the translator of Arabic and Russian in Arab Republic of Egypt under the auspices of the Ministry of Special Construction of the USSR. From August 1976 until October 1976, Ilham Madatov worked as a teacher at a secondary school in Varvara village of Yevlakh Region. In 1976 -1980, he held several managerial positions such as organizer, head of department and secretary within the Yevlakh City Komsomol Committee. From 1980 until 1984, he was sent to Libya as an Arabic - Russian translator by the Ministry of Defense of the USSR. From 1984 to 1988, Madatov worked as a consultant and department head in Yevlakh City Communist Party Committee. From 1988 to 1991, he studied the World Politics and International Relations at Moscow Social Sciences Academy in Russia and in 1991, he successfully completed that course. Ilham Madatov holds Ph.D. of Historical Sciences since 1991. From 1991 until 1995, he was Deputy Head of the Executive Power (Mayor) of the Yevlakh City. From 1995 until 2017, Madatov was Head of the International Relation Department of the Ministry of Youth and Sport of the Republic of Azerbaijan. From 2005 until 2011, Ilham Madatov was Bureau Member of the Sport Development Committee of the Council of Europe. He is the Member of National Olympic Committee of Azerbaijan since 2001. Three times he was the Chef de Mission of Azerbaijan Olympic Team in the Summer Olympic Games in Beijing 2008 XXIX, London 2012 XXX, Rio 2016 XXXI. Ilham Madatov was the Coordinator for the organizing the 18th Council of Europe Conference of Ministers responsible for Sport, which was held in Baku. Madatov was Secretary of the Organizing Committee of Baku – 2015 1st European Games. He was Secretary of the Bidding Committee of Summer and Paralympic Olympic Games 2016 in Baku. Ilham Madatov was appointed the rector of Azerbaijan Tourism and Management University in 2017 by the declaration of the President of the Republic of Azerbaijan.

=== Marital status ===
Married, has two children and four grandchildren.

== Awards and Medals ==
He was awarded with the “Taraggi” medal for contributing of the development of Azerbaijani sports and the effective functioning of the civil service in 2009. On the occasion of the 20th anniversary of the establishment of the National Olympic Committee of the Republic of Azerbaijan and services for development of sport, he was awarded with the 3rd degree order of “Vetene Xidmete gore” in 2012.

== Participating at the international events ==
- Annual Meetings and Seminars of the Committee of the Sports Development of the Council of Europe
- Meetings of the Council of Europe Inter-Governmental Youth Committee
- Conferences of Ministers of Sport Ministers and Youth Ministers of the Council of Europe
- Annual Meetings of the Council of Europe Enlarged Partial Agreement on Sport
- International conferences of UNESCO's Physical Education and sports ministers and senior officials (MINEPS)
- Conferences and meetings of the Organization of Islamic Cooperation on Sport and Youth
- General Assemblies and Workshops of the National Olympic Committees Association and the European Olympic Committees
