= The House of Haji Zulgadar Zulfugarov =

- Interactive map of The House of Haji Zulgadar Zulfugarov
- Location: 21 Ganjlar Street
- Area: Shaki, Azerbaijan
- Built: XIX century

The House of Haji Zulgadar Zulfugarov— a historical and architectural monument from the 19th century located in the city of Shaki.

The building was included in the list of immovable historical and cultural monuments of local significance by Decision No. 338 of the Cabinet of Azerbaijan dated November 3, 2021.

== About ==
The building was constructed in 1897 by Haji Zulgadar Zulfugarov, a silk merchant residing in Shaki, in the southwestern part of the Shaki fortress walls. The exact construction date is not inscribed on the building. The mansion, built in the Azerbaijani architectural style characteristic of Shaki, has three floors and consists of 28 rooms. Since the house was built on sloped terrain, it appears as three stories on the front facade and two on the rear. The door opening to the street features six carved decorative panels. Stone and baked brick were used in the construction of the building.

After Azerbaijan was occupied by the Bolsheviks, the Zulfuqarov family's properties were confiscated between 1926 and 1928. Following the confiscation of Zulgadar Zulfuqarov's house, it was first used as a girls’ seminary and a theater building by the decision of the Presidium of the Shaki Executive Committee. In October 1930, by order of the People's Commissariat for Education, the No. 2 Nukhа Orphanage was established in the building. Badiseba Khanum Kocharli was appointed as the director of the orphanage. She remained the head of this orphanage until the end of her life.

After Azerbaijan regained its independence, the orphanage continued to operate in the building until 2018. The building was included in the list of immovable historical and cultural monuments of local significance by Decision No. 338 of the Cabinet of Azerbaijan dated November 3, 2021.

In 2023, within the framework of the Italy-Azerbaijan University project, the opening of the Faculty of "Design and Architecture" was announced in Zulfuqarov's house in Shaki, in collaboration with ADA University and the Polytechnic University of Milan.

== See also ==
- Zulfugarov's madrasa
