= Institute of Applied Physics at the Ilia State University =

- გამოყენებითი ფიზიკის ინსტიტუტი
- Location: Tbilisi, Georgia
- Website: iliauni.edu.ge/en/

The Institute of Applied Physics at the Ilia State University (ISU)-head Ivane G. Murusidze

== Research ==
Research areas include:

- Structural and electronic properties of low-dimensional systems, atomic clusters and nanostructures;
- Biophysics of bacteria-metal interactions; microbial production of noble and semimetal nanoparticles;
- Intense laser interactions with plasmas, advanced plasma-based acceleration concepts, new radiation sources; relativistic nonlinear optics;
- Development and application of numerical techniques for the computer simulations of complex nonlinear systems.

Current research is focused on:

- Computer modeling and simulations of boron nitride nanostructures, their electronic and size-dependent structural properties.
- Biophysics of microbial synthesis of gold and silver nanoparticles by extremophilic archaeal strains.
- Theoretical modeling and computer simulations of intense laser-plasma interactions, relativistic nonlinear optics of ultrashort, ultraintense laser pulses in plasmas.

== Teaching & Education ==
The Institute of Applied Physics provides high-quality introductory, intermediate, and advanced-level courses in physics, statistics, computer modeling and applied mathematics to the School of Engineering and the School of Arts and Sciences at the Ilia State University. There are four Schools in the university, each offering undergraduate, graduate and post-graduate programs:
