= Zulfugarov's madrasa =

Coordinates: 41°12′05″N 47°11′37″E

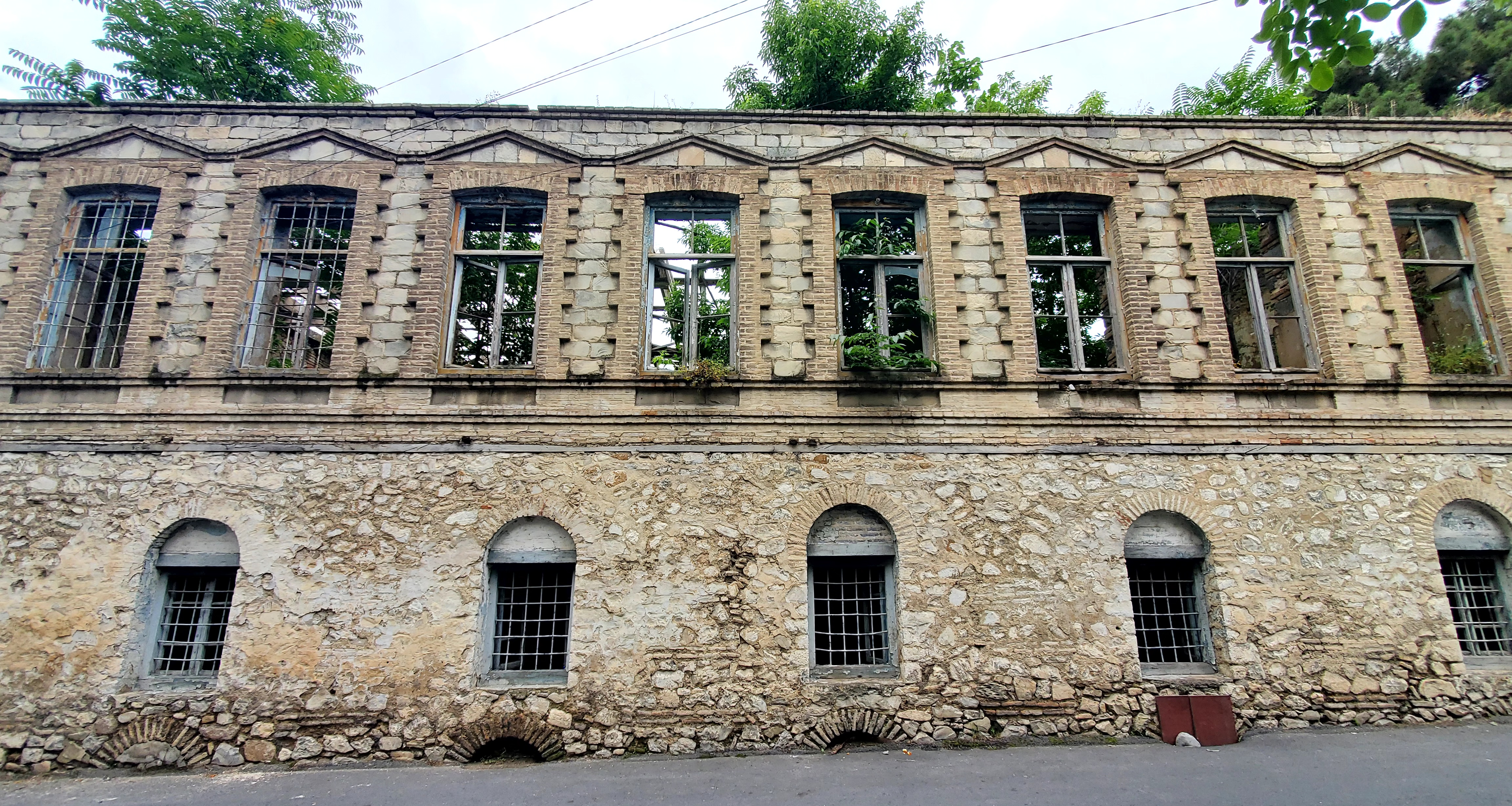
- Location: F. Khoyski Street, 7
- Area: Shaki, Azerbaijan
- Built: 1911

Zulfugarov's madrasa or Zulfuqarov's Mollakhana is a former madrasa and a historical and architectural monument located in the city of Shaki, Azerbaijan.

The building was included in the list of immovable historical and cultural monuments of local significance by Decision No. 338 of the Cabinet of Azerbaijan dated November 3, 2021.

== History ==
Zulfuqarov's madrasa was built in 1911 by the merchant Zulfuqarov. The construction date of the madrasa is inscribed in both the Hijri and Gregorian calendars on stone plaques located to the right and left of the building's main entrance door.

After Azerbaijan was occupied by the Bolsheviks, the Zulfuqarov family's properties were confiscated. In the following years, the madrasa building was used as a bank, as well as for sports, vocational, and music schools, and as a House of Intellectuals.

After Azerbaijan regained its independence, the building was returned to private ownership. It is currently in a dilapidated condition.

In 2001, the historic part of Shaki, where the building is located, was nominated for inclusion in the UNESCO World Heritage List. On July 7, 2019, "The Historic Centre of Shaki with the Khan’s Palace" was inscribed on the UNESCO World Heritage List. The decision was adopted at the 43rd session of the UNESCO World Heritage Committee held at the Baku Congress Center.

The building was included in the list of immovable historical and cultural monuments of local significance by Decision No. 338 of the Cabinet of Ministers of the Republic of Azerbaijan dated November 3, 2021.

== Architectural features ==
The madrasa was built in the traditional style of the Shaki school of architecture. Due to its construction on sloped terrain, the building appears as three stories on the front facade and two stories on the rear facade. To prevent direct access to the building from the street, the main entrance is located at the intersection of the north and west facades, at the level of the second floor due to the sloping relief. The building's facade features decorative elements made of Shaki-style stained glass (shebeke) and carved patterns. The motifs used in the facade decorations reflect both religious and secular themes. The interior of the building is also designed in the traditional style of the Shaki architectural school. The rooms are spacious and well-lit. The ceilings are wooden, and the walls are plastered with lime. Some rooms contain wall paintings and ornamental designs. The layout is simple and functional. The 485-square-meter madrasa building is organized with rooms arranged in two rows and a central corridor. The floor plans of the first and second stories are nearly identical. On the third floor, part of the corridor wall was removed to create a large hall, and some changes were made to the layout.

== See also ==
- The House of Haji Zulgadar Zulfugarov

== Sources ==
=== Literature ===
- Mirzəliyeva, Sevil (2025). Tarixin izlərini günümüzə daşıyan memarlıq inciləri (Zülfüqarovların mülkləri) (PDF) (in Azerbaijani). Bakı: SCIENTIFIC WORK International Scientific Journal. p. 181. ISSN 2663-4619.
