= Azerbaijan Tourism and Management University =

Coordinates: 40°23′53″N 49°51′26″E

Azerbaijan Tourism and Management University (abbr. ATMU) trained cadres in tourism in Azerbaijan, established under the Ministry of Culture and Tourism of the Republic Azerbaijan. The professional goals of the university include improvement of the tourism industry, training personnel to meet the needs for qualified personnel in the field of travel and leisure and hospitality.

In 2014, the institute became the university of tourism and management (Azerbaijan Tourism and Management University). Azerbaijan Tourism and Management University cooperates with many local and international organizations. Within the framework of cooperation, several research and development projects, teacher / student exchanges have been implemented.

== Faculty ==
There are three faculties in ATMU :

- Tourism and Hospitality
- Service engineering
- Business administration

=== Faculty of Tourism and Hospitality ===
Qualifications:

- Tourism and hotel management;
- Tourism and management (In English)
- Linguistics

Students: 585 students in full-time, 75 students in part-time

Academic staff: 1 professor, 12 senior lecturers, 2 senior teachers, 58 teachers

Clubs and organizations: the Student Youth Organizations, Student Scientific Society, and Career center

=== Faculty of Service engineering ===
Qualifications:

- Social work
- International relations
- Regional studies
- Museology and observation monuments and archival work
- Transport service
- Food engineering

Students: 452 students in full-time, 21 people in part-time

Academic staff: 2 professors, 21 senior lecturers, 12 senior teachers, 23 teachers

Club and organizations: Student Scientific Society, Student Youth Organizations Union,"Students" club, "Debate" club, "Dance" group, "Career center"

=== Faculty of Business administration ===
Qualifications:

- Management
- Marketing
- Business administration (bachelor)
- Finance (bachelor)
- Organization and management of business

Students: 418 students in bachelor's degree: 38 students in master's degree, 17 students in a doctorate degree

Academic staff: 2 professors, 6 senior lecturers, 13 senior teachers, 15 teachers

Club and organizations: Faculty Research Council, Student Scientific Society, Student Youth Organizations, Career Center

== Exchange programs ==
The university has many relations with other universities in the world. The following programs are with Austria, Turkey and Germany.

=== Jade University of Applied Science ===
Azerbaijan University of Tourism and Management and Jade University of Applied Sciences (Germany) began to work as the partner universities in agreement with the cooperation signed in 2008. The main direction of cooperation is aimed at the exchange of students. In agreement with the cooperation of exchange program are settled for qualification as tourism and hospitality, management and marketing in agreement with the cooperation for the exchange of students.

=== Mevlana program ===
Mevlana program is an exchange program that established and financed by the Republic of Turkey and Council of Higher Education (CoHE).The main goal of the program is to ensure the improvement of intercultural dialogue, realize the exchange program (teacher-student) among the universities in Turkey and in the world.

The following Turkish universities included in Mevlana Exchange Program:

- Gazi University;
- Kars Caucasus University;
- Canik Basharan University;
- Ardahan University;
- Sinop University;
- Kastamonu University;
- Mush Arp Arslan University;
- Amasya University;
- Mediterranean University;
- University of the Ege;
- Kocaeli University.

=== The AATP programme ===
The IMC University of Applied Sciences Krems and the ATMU implemented an Austrian bachelor's degree programme in "Tourism and Leisure Management" in Baku in 2007. At that time, this was the first and only double degree programme in Azerbaijan's Education System.

English is the language of instruction on the Azerbaijan-Austrian Tourism Programme, with teaching by faculty from the ATMU and the IMC, as well as industry experts from Austria and other countries.

After the successful completion of a foundation year, ATMU students can apply for joining the IMC BA programme (3 years). Upon graduation, students obtain two degrees: The local degree from the ATMU and the Austrian (European Union) Bachelor's degree, with the latter giving students the opportunity to apply for further education in Europe.

== See also ==
- Education in Azerbaijan
- Tourism in Azerbaijan
