= Emin Amrullayev =

Azerbaijani politician

- Emin Əmrullayev
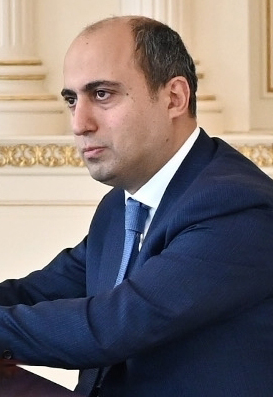
- Amrullayev in 2022

Minister of Science and Education
- Incumbent
- Assumed office 28 July 2022
- President: Ilham Aliyev
- Prime Minister: Ali Asadov
- Preceded by: Post has been established

Minister of Education
- In office 27 July 2020 – 28 July 2022
- President: Ilham Aliyev
- Prime Minister: Ali Asadov
- Preceded by: Jeyhun Bayramov
- Succeeded by: Emin Amrullayev (post has been cancelled)

Personal details
- Born: 30 December 1982 (age 43) Baku, Azerbaijan Azerbaijan SSR, Soviet Union (now Azerbaijan)
- Education: The Academy of Public Administration under the President of the Republic of Azerbaijan; Central European University; Columbia University, the USA

Emin Eldar oglu Amrullayev (Azerbaijani: Emin Eldar oğlu Əmrullayev; born 30 December 1982), is serving as the minister of education of the Republic of Azerbaijan since July 2020 and President of the Azerbaijan Basketball Federation since 2021. He served as director of the Institute of Education of the Republic of Azerbaijan from January 2020 to July 2020 and as Head of the Education Programs Development Department at the Ministry of Education of Azerbaijan from March 2015 to January 2020.

== Biography ==
From 1999 to 2003, he studied at the Academy of Public Administration under the President of the Republic of Azerbaijan, graduated from the faculty of Public Administration and obtained Bachelor's degree with honors. From 2003 to 2004, he studied at the Central European University, graduated from the department of political science and obtained Master's degree. From 2010 to 2012, within the "State Program for the Education of Azerbaijani Youth Abroad in 2007-2015" and the Fulbright programs, he obtained a Master's degree in Public (Administrative) Management at Columbia University.

He served as the Minister of Education of the Republic of Azerbaijan from 2020 to 2022, Director of the Institute of Education from January to July 2020 and Head of the department of Educational Development Programs at the Ministry of Education from March 2015 to January 2020.
