= Mushfiq Mammadli =

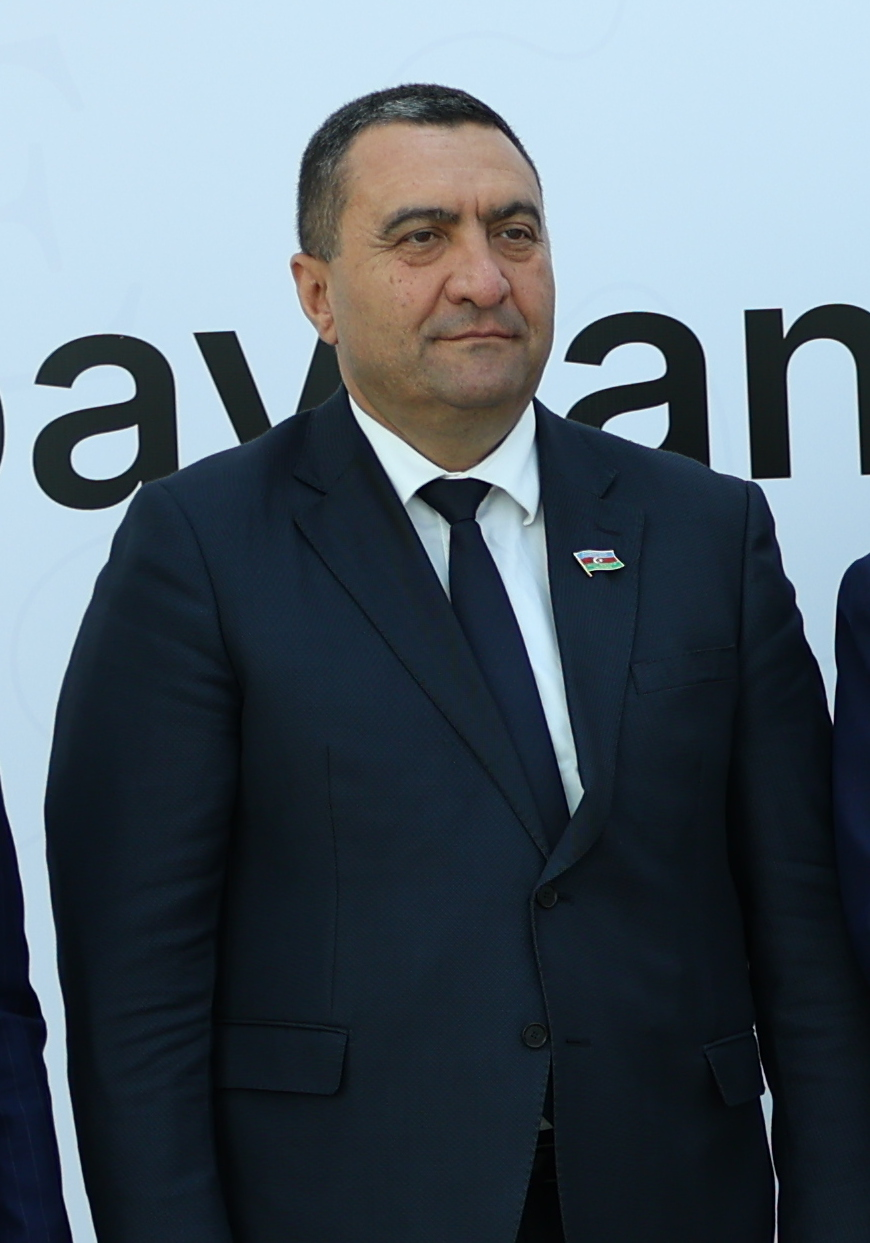

Member of the 6th National Assembly of Azerbaijan

Personal details
- Born: August 1, 1972 (age 54) Azerbaijan Sumgait
- Party: New Azerbaijan Party
- Education: Azerbaijan Medical University

Müşfiq Məmmədli Fazil Oğlu (born August 1, 1972, in Sumgayit) is a deputy of the 6th convocation of the National Assembly of the Republic of Azerbaijan.

== Biography ==
- In 1989, he graduated from secondary school number 25 in the city of Sumgayit. From 1989 to 1990 he worked as a paramedic at Clinical Medical Center No. 1 (Semashko). He studied at the Faculty of Pediatrics of Azerbaijan Medical University between 1990 and 1996.
- He did an internship at Sumgayit City Children's Hospital in 1996–1997, and worked as a doctor in the reception department in 1997–1999. He studied in Istanbul for 3 years in 2000.
- He worked as a doctor between 2004 and 2006, and then was the chief of the medical station of military unit No. N in the Tatar region. He worked as a doctor at the Emergency Medical Center between 2006 and 2014, and then at the Sumgayit Children's Hospital. He served as Head of Pediatrics Department at Children's Hospital in 2015–2016, and has been serving as the chief physician of the hospital since 2016. Between 2013 and 2015, Russia St. He also gained expertise in "Management of Health Organizations" within the framework of the MBA program at St. Petersburg University of Economics, School of Economics.
- He has been a member of the Russian Association of Pediatricians since 2016.
- He is married and has three children.

== Political activity ==
- He is a member of the New Azerbaijan Party.
- He is the chairman of the Azerbaijan-Brazil interparliamentary relations working group.

== See also ==
- Vugar Iskandarov
