= Theology Institute of Azerbaijan =

University in Baku, Azerbaijan

Coordinates: 40°23′01″N 49°49′36″E

Azerbaijan Institute of Theology
- Azərbaycan İlahiyyat İnstitutu
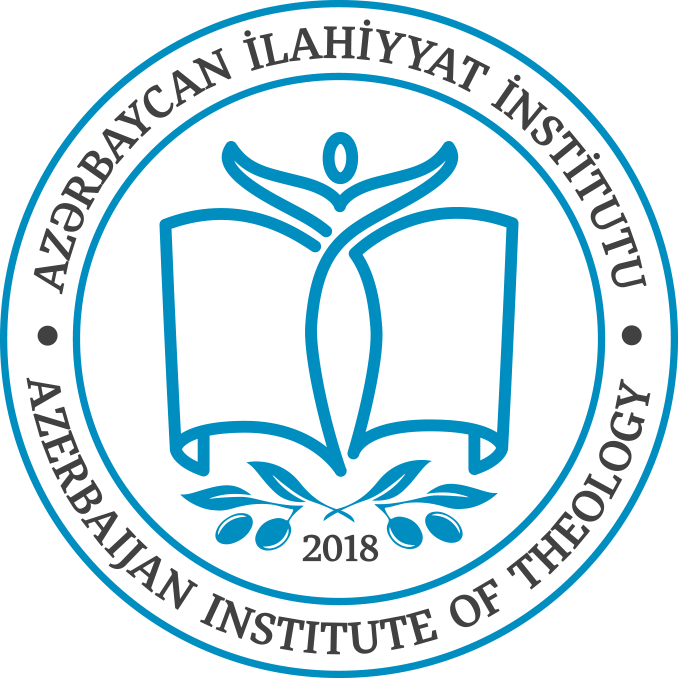
- Established: February 9, 2018
- Rector: Agil Shirinov
- Location: Baku, Azerbaijan

The Azerbaijan Institute of Theology (Azerbaijani: Azərbaycan İlahiyyat İnstitutu) is an Azerbaijani higher education institution specializing in Islamic Theology and General Religious Studies. It operates under the direction of the State Committee for Work with Religious Organizations of the Republic of Azerbaijan. At present, three departments and one faculty comprise the institution. Education is carried out in Azerbaijani. The former rector of the Institute is Jeyhun Mammadov. The current rector of the Azerbaijan Institute of Theology is Agil Shirinov.

== History ==
A presidential decree authorized its creation on 9 February 2018. The decree ensured inclusion of the faculty of Theology of the Baku State University in the Institute of Theology.

The opening ceremony took place on September 17, 2018.

== Structure ==
The Institute has one faculty: Faculty of Theology, which has two departments: The Department of Islamic Studies and the Department of Religious Studies. The Department of Islamic Studies focuses on Islamic Theology, while the Department of Religious Studies focuses on studying all world religions and its program is based on the Religious Studies programs of universities like University of Oxford, University of Cambridge, Stanford University and California State University.

== Logo ==
The Institute announced a contest on 26 July 2018 to organize its logo. For this purpose, a commission was created, consisting of:

- Yagut Aliyeva, the Director of the Public Relations Department of the State Committee for Religious Organizations
- Eldar Mikayilzade, the People's Artist of Azerbaijan
- Zaur Orujov, the scientific worker of the Institute of Manuscripts of Azerbaijan
- Kevser Tagiyev, the teacher of the Azerbaijan Institute of Theology

106 different logos were presented. On August 8th, the submission of Konul Mammadzadeh was chosen. According to the unanimous opinion of the commission, the logo reflected the purpose and mission of the Institute. Specifically, the human symbol whose hands are turned toward the sky reflects how multiculturalism and tolerance communicate with God, the book represents the main source of knowledge, and the olive branch expresses peace and spirituality.

== Purpose ==
The purpose of the institute is to ensure the preservation and development of the religious and spiritual environment, based on the historical traditions of the Azerbaijani people. Philosophy, sociology, psychology, multiculturalism, informatics and other social and humanitarian sciences are to be taught along with religious sciences.

== Administration ==
Jeyhun Mammadov was appointed as the rector of the institute on May 31, 2018. The first Prorector of the Institute was appointed on 13 September 2018. Professor Mubariz Jamalov was appointed Prorector on educational work, while Agil Shirinov was appointed Prorector for Science and Innovation.

== See also ==
- List of universities in Azerbaijan
- List of universities in Baku
