= Pericles A. Mitkas =

Greek university lecturer

Pericles A. Mitkas (born 1962 in Florina, Greece) is a Greek university lecturer in electronic and computer engineering. He holds American as well as Greek nationality and is Rector of the Aristotle University of Thessaloniki (AUTH). He was elected as President of both the Black Sea Universities Network and the Balkan Universities Network from 2018 to 2020.

== Life and work ==
Mitkas studied at the AUTH and obtained a diploma as Elektroingenieur (electrical engineer) in 1985. In 1987 he obtained a master's degree in computer engineering at Syracuse University in the US state of New York, and a Ph.D. in 1990 at the same university with a dissertation titled "On Relational Database Operations Implemented in Optics".

Mitkas became assistant professor in 1990 and an associate professor in 1996 at Syracuse University and was at the same time was visiting professor at the AUTH. In 1999 he returned to the AUTH and took over the Department of Electrical and Computer Engineering as professor. He also took over a number administrative posts at this university and from 2010 until 2014 was a member of its Senate. He was elected its rector in 2014.

Mitkas is married to Sophia Mardiri and has two children.

In 2020, he was awarded the Bronze Cross of Merit by the President of the Republic of Poland, Andrzej Duda.

== Main works (selection) ==
- Parallel Computer Architecture for Large Data Volumes and their Analysis
- Software User and Multiple User Systems
- Data Gapture and Evaluation Systems
- Multi-User Systems for Ecological Management
- Parallel Evaluation Systems for Large Volumes of Biological Data
- Semantic Scientific Evaluation of Texts in the Internet

== Memberships (selection) ==
- Senior Member of IEEE and the IEEE Computer Society
- Optical Society of America (OSA)
- Society for Photooptical Instrumentation Engineering (SPIE)
- SPIE Working Group on Optical Processing & Computing and of the SPIE Working Group on Holography
- Association for Computing Machinery (ACM)
- Hellenic Society of Computational Biology and Bioinformatics
- Technical Chamber of Greece
