= Matin Karimli =

Azerbaijani politician and public figure

Matin Karimli Mətin Kərimli

Director of International Labour Organization Office for Pacific Island Countries
- Incumbent
- Assumed office January 2020

Deputy Minister of Labour and Social Protection of Population of the Republic of Azerbaijan
- In office 20 February 2014 – 29 December 2019
- President: Ilham Aliyev

Personal details
- Born: Mətin İmdad oğlu Kərimli; 6 June 1979 (age 47) Baku, Azerbaijan SSR, USSR

Matin Imdad oghlu Karimli (Azerbaijani: Mətin İmdad oğlu Kərimli; born 6 June 1979) is the Director of International Labour Organization Office for Pacific Island Countries since 2020, previously serving as Deputy Minister of Labour and Social Protection of Population of the Republic of Azerbaijan from 2014 to 2019.

== Biography ==
Matin Karimli was born on June 6, 1979, in Baku. He graduated from Baku State University in 1999 with a bachelor's degree in international relations. In 2000–2001 he received an interdisciplinary diploma in European sciences from the University of Strasbourg in France (Robert Schuman University), and in 2001–2002 he received his master's degree in European sciences. In May–July 2005, he attended the Leaders Program at the George C. Marshall European Center for Security Studies in Germany. In January–August 2006, he completed the senior course at NATO Defense College. In 2012, Matin Karimli received his master's degree in public administration from Harvard Kennedy School (United States) and a Mason Programs diploma in Public Policy and Management. In 2017–2018, he received a Master's certificate in project management organized by the Baku Higher Oil School in cooperation with George Washington University.

Matin Karimli worked as the vice-president of the National Assembly of Youth Organizations of the Republic of Azerbaijan in 1998–1999. He served in Azerbaijani Armed Forces in 2003–2004. From 2005 to 2008, Matin Karimli worked as a desk officer in the Department of Security Affairs of the Ministry of Foreign Affairs of the Republic of Azerbaijan. In 2008–2009, he served as a Partnership for Peace officer at the International Secretariat of NATO. In 2009–2011, he served as a second secretary at the Mission of Azerbaijan to NATO, and in March–June 2011, he was the second secretary of the Security Affairs Department of the Ministry of Foreign Affairs of the Republic of Azerbaijan.

From June 2012 to February 2014, Matin Karimli worked as the Head of the International Relations Department of the Ministry of Taxes of the Republic of Azerbaijan. On February 24, 2014, he was appointed Deputy Minister of Labour and Social Protection of Population of the Republic of Azerbaijan. He held this position until December 29, 2019.

Since January 2020, Matin Karimli has been the Director of the International Labour Organization's (ILO) Office for Pacific Island Countries. Matin Karimli is responsible for 22 Pacific countries, including 11 member countries.

Matin Karimli speaks English, French, Russian and Spanish.

He is married and has 3 children.
