= Gigi Tevsadze =

Founding director of Ilia State University

Gigi Tevsadze (Georgian: გიგი თევზაძე) is a Georgian academic, researcher, and founding director of Ilia State University (2006–2013), one of Georgia' main institutions of higher education. He remains at this institution as a professor. Tevsadze also works as the director of the 4D research institute at Ilia State University.

Tevsadze is the author of multiple publications in Georgian and English. His books focus on philosophy and the role of religion in society. His Guide to Critical Thinking has also been published in English. Among his other publications is a widely cited analysis on Power Elites in Georgia (with Zurab Chiaberashvili). He has also written on a range of other topics, including wolf-human conflict in Georgia.

Tevsadze has also worked as a consultant for Georgian and international organizations, as head of the research department of the Parliament of Georgia, and as a manager of major reform projects. Tevzadze holds several degrees in philosophy from Ivane Javakhishvili Tbilisi State University, including doctoral and candidate degrees.

== Selected publications ==
- Why do you believe in God, Sulakauri Publishing, link, 2017
- Guide to Critical Thinking, Sulakauri Publishing, link
- The Birth of the Georgian Nation. Identity and Ideology. Politetal and Societal Identities. Nationality and Religiosity., link, 2009
- Der Salon als Instanz einer Vermittlung zwischen Staat und Gesellschaft: Eine Studie zur Geschichte literarischer Vermittlung, translated into German by Philipp Löser, in Europa - ein Salon?: Beiträge zur Internationalität des literarischen Salons, Wallstein Verlag, 1999
