= Ilia State University =

Public university in Tbilisi, Georgia

- ილიას სახელმწიფო უნივერსიტეტი
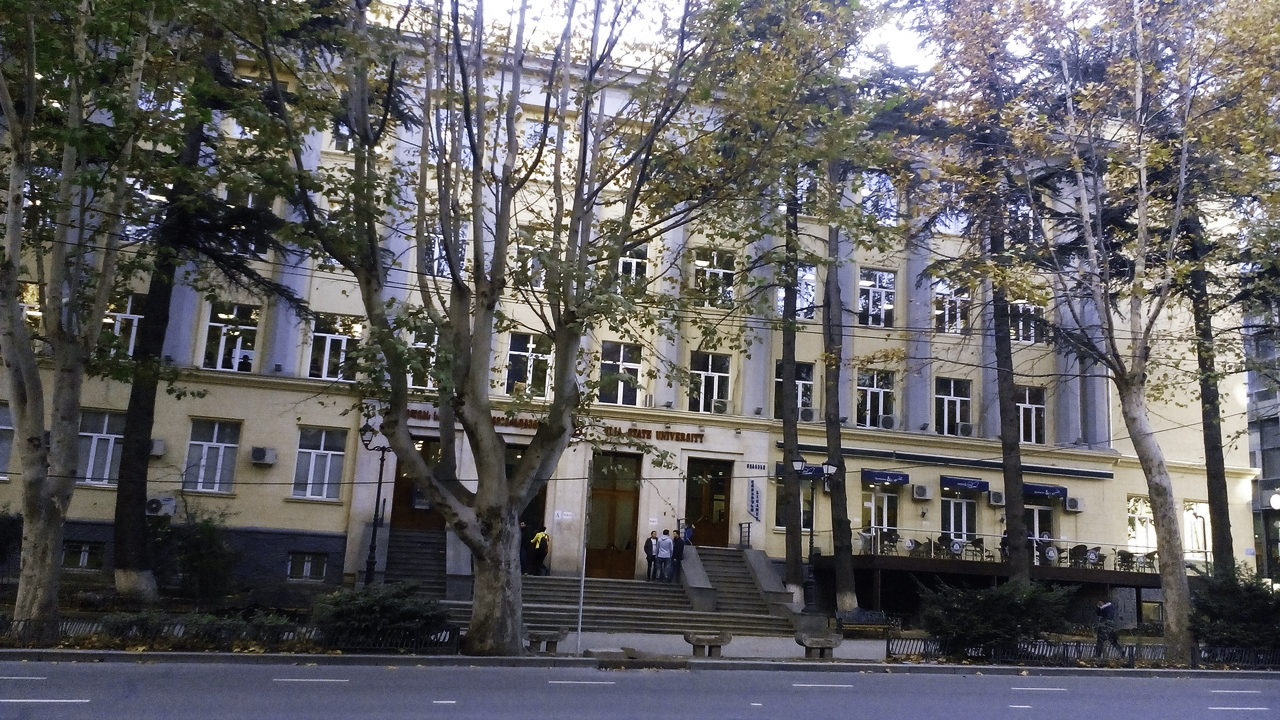
- Latin: Heliae Universitas Publica
- Type: Public
- Established: 2006; 20 years ago
- Chancellor: Ketevan Darakhvelidze
- Rector: Nino Doborjginidze
- Academic staff: 800
- Students: 16000
- Location: 45 Ilia Chavchavadze Ave, Tbilisi, 0179, Georgia
- Campus: 12
- Language: Georgian, English
- Website: www.iliauni.edu.ge

Ilia State University ISU (Georgian: ილიას სახელმწიფო უნივერსიტეტი) is a public university in Tbilisi, Georgia that was founded in 2006 as a result of a merger of six different academic institutions. Currently, ISU is one of the leading research and educational institutions in Georgia.

== History ==
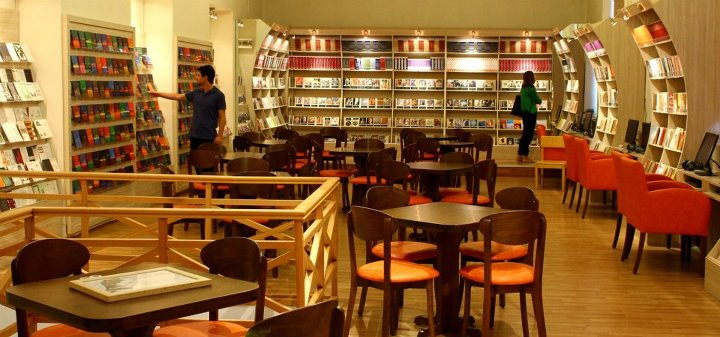
"Ligamus" book store at Iliauni

Ilia State University (ISU), located in Tbilisi, is a flagship public research and comprehensive higher education institution in the South Caucasus which focuses on scientific advancement and transferring top notch knowledge to facilitate societal development.

Established in 2006 as a merger of six different institutions, each having a long history and a diverse institutional profile, Ilia State University ranks as the top research university in the South Caucasus, according to its research output.

ISU's mission revolves around three main principles: academic freedom, freedom of conscience, and freedom of choice.

Its four faculties (Faculty of Arts and Sciences, Faculty of Natural Sciences and Medicine, Faculty of Business, Technology and Education, and School of Law) offer distinctive training in their respective directions and along with 30 large and small scale research institutes, centers and stations – create in-depth research opportunities in social sciences, humanities, business, law, life sciences, earth sciences, and hard sciences.

ISU has put a special focus on contribution to science popularization, boosting entrepreneurial ecosystem of the country and actively carrying out social responsibility projects. With the highest competition rate for PhD programs in the nation, extensive international ties, around 16,000 students, over 1,500 highly qualified academic and research staff, and with renovated research infrastructure in several Georgia's regions, ISU ranks highly in annual student choice.

Its previous rectors include Gigi Tevsadze and Giga Zedania. Since 2022, the university is led by Nino Doborjginidze, a linguist.

== Study ==
The four faculties of Ilia State University offer distinctive training in their respective directions and along with 30 large and small scale research institutes, centers and stations – create in-depth research opportunities in social sciences, humanities, business, law, life sciences, earth sciences, and hard sciences.

- Faculty of Arts and Sciences - Faculty of Arts and Sciences is one of the largest and oldest schools of ISU. The faculty offers academic programs on all 3 levels (Bachelor's, Master's, and Doctoral) including in Liberal Arts, Philosophy, Education, Political Science, International Relations, Psychology, Sociology, European Studies, History, Foreign Languages, Theatre Studies, Music, Religion Studies, Public Policy, Soviet Studies, Archeology, Art Studies, Medieval Studies, Social Work and other programs covering the fields of Social Sciences, Humanities and Arts.
- Faculty of Natural Sciences and Medicine - Faculty of Natural Sciences and Medicine is a research intensive school offering a wide diversity of top quality academic programs. It implements BA, MA and Ph.D. programs in Physics and Astronomy, Mathematics, Biology, Neurosciences and Biochemistry, Ecology and Genetics, Electrical and Computer Engineering, Nutrition Science, Sustainable Natural and Forest Resources Management, New Materials for Nanoengineering, Energy and Mineral Resources Management and Sustainable Development, Green Architecture and Software Engineering. In 2019 the faculty launched Medical Doctor (MD) Educational Program.The faculty holds top positions in Caucasus for its research in astronomy and astrophysics, neurobiology, ecology, genetics, and evolutionary studies. Basic and applied research is performed in a number of research laboratories and facilities located both on campus and in various regions of Georgia.
- Faculty of Business, Technology and Education - Faculty of Business, Technology and Education, restructured in 2019, unites over 7,000 students within its undergraduate and graduate programs. The Faculty unites the Business School, the School of Technology and the School of Education.United under the umbrella of the new faculty students are able to benefit from the synergy of the three increasingly interconnected academic fields, implement high-tech projects jointly at the university labs, as well as begin startups and acquire versatile knowledge and skills to become successful freelancers. The hands-on approach and entrepreneurial spirit is supported by engaging students in real-work environment in the modern labs, research activities and offering practical experience in cooperation with Georgian and international industries and educational institutions.
- School of Law - The law school runs the following degree programs: Bachelor of Laws (LLB), Master of Private (Business) Law (LLM), Master of Public Law and Policy and Master in Criminal Law.The faculty unites seasoned lawyers from all walks of life: judges adjudicating cases in common courts or the Constitutional Court of Georgia, successful in-house and litigation lawyers, human rights defenders, public prosecutors and women's right activists. The goal of the School of Law is to produce not only successful lawyers, but all-round professionals who are ready to pursue successful careers in different sectors.

== Research ==
The university operates 25 research institutes, centers and laboratories dispersed across the country.

- Institute of Botany
- Institute of Applied Physics
- Institute of Applied Psychology
- Institute of Earth Sciences
- Institute of Zoology
- Institute of Ecology
- Institute of Theoretical Physics
- International School for Caucasus Studies
- Center of Linguistic Research
- Institute for Modernity Studies
- Language Didactics Research Centre
- Dimitri Uznadze Institute of Psychology
- Research Centre for Semiotics
- Laboratory of Social Studies
- Institute for Fundamental and Interdisciplinary Mathematics Research
- Institute of Chemical Biology
- Institute of Comparative Literature
- Tengiz Oniani laboratory of Sleep-Wakefulness
- Institute of Medical Research
- Art Research Institute
- G. Tsereteli Institute of Oriental Studies
- Institute of Politology
- Savle Tsereteli Institute of Philosophy
- Institute of Biophysics
- 4D Research Institute

== International relations ==
Ilia State University is a member of the following networks and organizations:

- Association “Rondine Cittadella della Pace”
- International Association of Universities – IAU
- Association “Österreichisches Sprachdiplom Deutsch ”- ÖSD
- European Cooperation in the Field of Science and Technology - COST
- European Universities Association - EUA
- European Network of Occupational Therapy (ENOTHE)
- Francophone Universities Agency (AUF)

The University has established partnership relations with different education institutions abroad, some at university others at faculty or individual level. The list includes:

- University of Cambridge (UK),
- Berkley Laboratory (USA),
- International Centre for Theoretical Physics (Italy),
- University of Michigan (USA),
- Montpellier University (France),
- Pedagogical University of Italy (Italy),
- Suleiman Demirely University (Turkey),
- University of Austria (Australia),
- University of Bonn (Germany),
- University of Fribourg (Switzerland),
- Harvard University (USA),
