= Hasan Hasanli =

Azerbaijani politician (born 1991)

Deputy Minister of Science and Education
- Incumbent
- Assumed office January 28, 2023

Personal details
- Born: 1991 (age 34–35) Nakhchivan, Nakhchivan Autonomous Republic
- Citizenship: Azerbaijan
- Children: 2

Hasan Hasanli (Azerbaijani: Həsən Həbib oğlu Həsənli; born 1991) is the Deputy Minister of Science and Education of the Republic of Azerbaijan.

== Early life and education ==
Hasan Hasanli was born in 1991 in the city of Nakhchivan. In 2009-2013, he received bachelor's and master's degrees in public policy and political sciences at Bristol and Cambridge universities in Great Britain within the framework of the "2007-2015 State Program for the Education of Azerbaijani Youth in Foreign Countries".

In 2015-2016, he completed active military service in the Armed Forces of the Republic of Azerbaijan.

He speaks Russian, Azerbaijani and English.

He is married and has two children.

== Career ==
Hasan Hasanli started working in the Ministry of Science and Education as a sector manager when he was 23 years old in 2014. After military service he returned back to the ministry as an advisor to the minister at 26 years old in 2017, and later as a deputy chief of staff and chairman of the board of the Agency for Quality Assurance in Education. From June 2021 to January 30, 2023, he worked as the Chief of Staff of the Ministry of Science and Education.

By the Decree of the President of the Republic of Azerbaijan on January 28, 2023, he was appointed as the Deputy Minister of Science and Education.
