= Gafur Mammadov =

Soviet Azerbaijani seaman (1922–1942)

- Qafur Nəsir oğlu Məmmədov
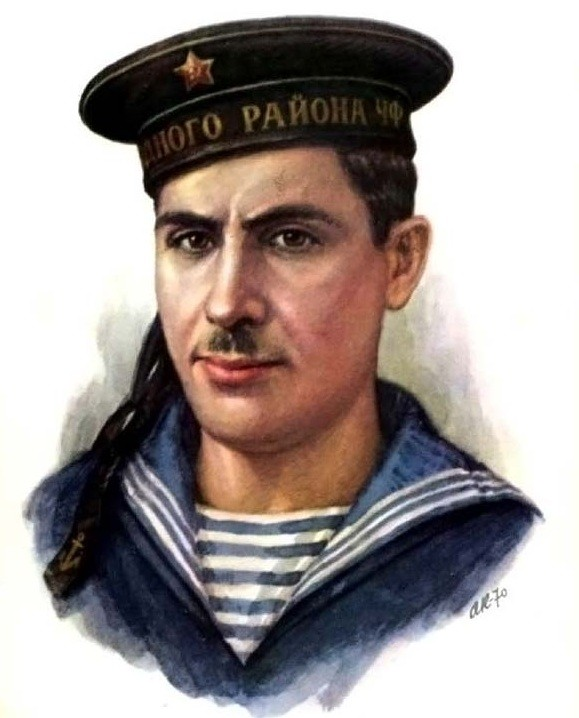
- Born: 5 March 1922; Baku, Azerbaijan SSR
- Died: 19 October 1942 (aged 20) northwest of Tuapse, Krasnodar Krai, RSFSR, Soviet Union
- Military career
- Allegiance: Soviet Union
- Branch: Soviet Navy
- Service years: 1941–42
- Rank: Matros
- Unit: 323rd Separate Naval Infantry Battalion
- Conflicts: World War II; Battle of the Caucasus
- Awards: Hero of the Soviet Union

Gafur Nasir oglu Mammadov (Azerbaijani: Qafur Nəsir oğlu Məmmədov; 5 March 1922 – 18 October 1942) was an Azerbaijani Soviet Navy Matros (ordinary seaman) and a posthumous Hero of the Soviet Union. Mammadov was posthumously awarded the title on 31 March 1943 for reportedly shielding his commander from fire with his body.

== Early life ==
Mammadov was born on 5 March 1922 in Baku in a working-class family. He graduated from primary school. Mammadov became a typesetter in the Printing House named after the 26 Baku Commissars.

== World War II ==
Mammadov was drafted into the Red Army in August 1941 following the German invasion of the Soviet Union. Mammadov became a naval infantryman in the Black Sea Fleet's 323rd Separate Naval Infantry Battalion. Mammadov fought in combat from September 1941. He fought in the Battle of the Caucasus. Mammadov fought in the defense of Tuapse. On 19 October 1942, during a battle northwest of Tuapse, the battalion's defenses were penetrated by German troops. The command post of Mammadov's company was surrounded by German troops. Mammadov and other soldiers reportedly repulsed German attacks. He reportedly killed thirteen German soldiers, before being killed shielding his commander from German fire. Mammadov was buried in Tuapse. On 31 March 1943, Mammadov was awarded the title Hero of the Soviet Union and the Order of Lenin for his actions.

== Legacy ==
Mammadov was permanently listed on the rolls of his unit. The Baku Marine College was named after him. A ship of the Ministry of the River Fleet of the USSR was named for him. A street in Baku was named after him, and a bust was placed there. A park in Baku also bears his name and contains a statue of him.
