= Ministry of Science and Education (Azerbaijan) =

Government ministry of Azerbaijan

Ministry of Science and Education of the Republic of Azerbaijan
- Azərbaycan Respublikasının Elm və Təhsil Nazirliyi
- Emblem of the Ministry of Science and Education

Agency overview
- Formed: May 28, 1918
- Jurisdiction: Government of Azerbaijan
- Headquarters: 49 Khatai Avenue, Baku, Azerbaijan Republic AZ1008
- Agency executives: Emin Amrullayev, Minister; Firudin Gurbanov, Deputy Minister; Idris Isayev, Deputy Minister; Hasan Hasanli, Deputy Minister; Kanan Karimzada, Deputy Minister; Matin Karimli, Chief of staff
- Website: www.edu.gov.az

The Ministry of Science and Education of the Republic of Azerbaijan (Azerbaijani: Azərbaycan Respublikasının Elm və Təhsil Nazirliyi) is a governmental agency within the Cabinet of Azerbaijan in charge of regulating the education system in Azerbaijan.

== History ==
The Education Ministry was one of the government agencies established on May 18, 1918, when the Azerbaijan Democratic Republic declared independence. The first agency, named the Ministry of Public Enlightenment, consisted of three departments: General Secondary Education, Higher and Secondary Specialized Education, Vocational Schools. The Council of Ministers of Azerbaijan approved the motion on June 30, 1920.

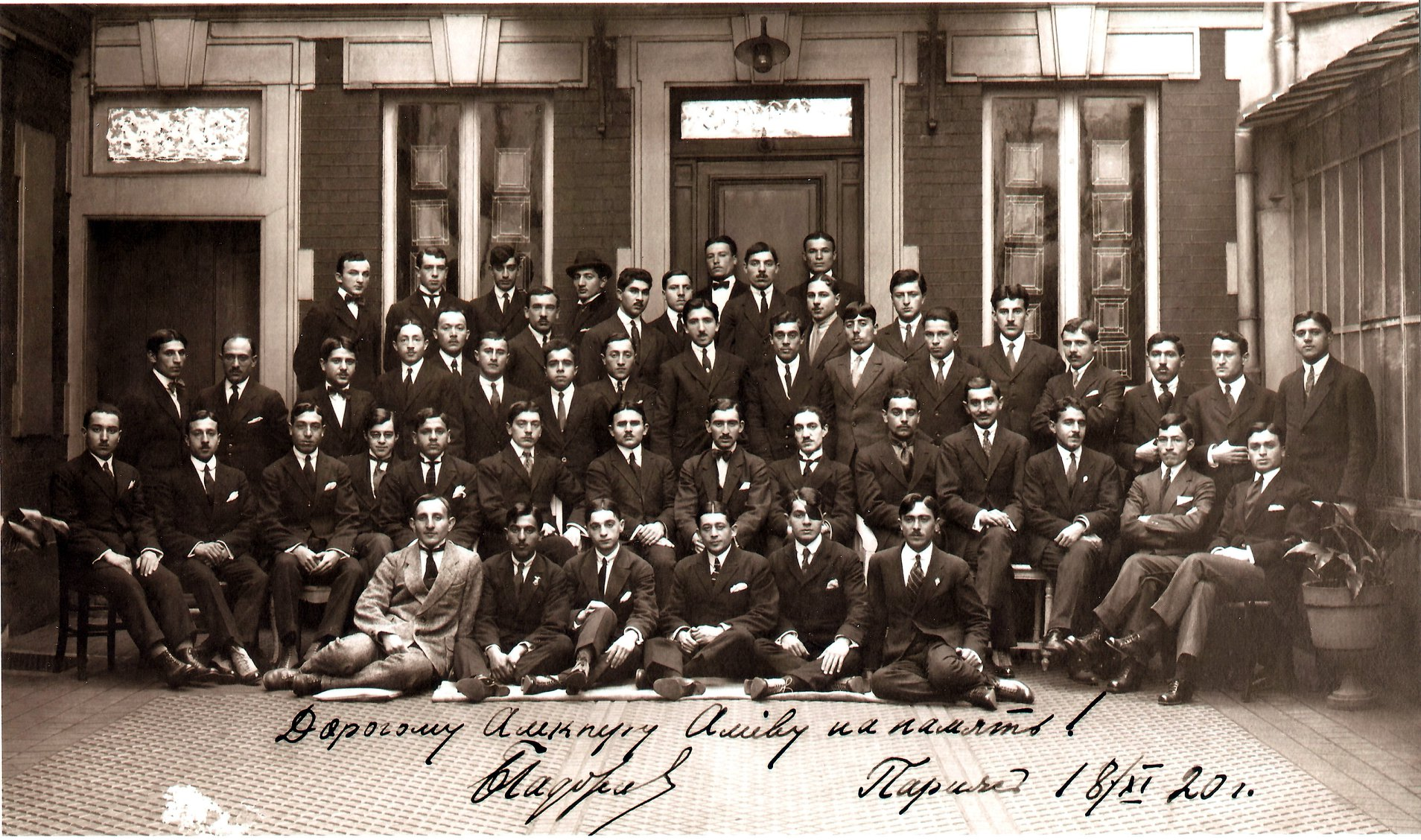
Group of Azerbaijani students studying in Paris in 1920

After Soviet rule was established in Azerbaijan on April 28, 1920, the ministry was transformed into the Commissariat of Public Enlightenment by Decree No. 1 of the Council of Ministers of Azerbaijan SSR, bringing all educational institutions in the republic under its direct supervision. In 1940, the Council of Ministers approved the creation of a separate government agency, the Department of Labour Reserves, which would oversee the activities of vocational institutions. In 1959, the authorities transformed the entity into the State Committee of Vocational Education, which functioned until 1988. In 1959, the Council of Ministers also approved the establishment of the Committee of Higher and Secondary Special Education, transferring all institutions of secondary and higher education under its control, which from 1964 until 1988 acted as an independent government agency. In 1988, all education agencies were abolished by decree of the Council of Ministers, and the Ministry of National Education was founded in their place. The ministry was reorganized into the Ministry of Education by presidential order on September 3, 1993. The ministry regulations were approved by presidential decree dated March 1, 2005. In 2013 Mikayil Cabbarov was appointed the minister of education.

According to the Decree of the President of the Republic of Azerbaijan, H.E. Ilham Aliyev "On some measures to improve the management in the field of science and education in the Republic of Azerbaijan" dated July 28, 2022 the Ministry of Education of the Republic of Azerbaijan was renamed to Ministry of Science and Education of the Republic of Azerbaijan in order to strengthen the science and education interaction and to improve management in these fields.

== Structure ==
The ministry is headed by the minister and three deputy ministers. There is also a separate Education Department for Baku. The functions of the ministry include but are not limited to enforcing government procedures and policies in the education sector, determining the development concepts of the education system of Azerbaijan and preparation of government programs for their realization; protection of rights of citizens to receive proper education, create conditions for equality in educational institutions; ensuring quality of the education given to citizens of the country; creation of economic and organizational models according to modern standards; enforce democratic mechanisms in the management; forecast the workforce demand markets in education of specialized professionals; increasing scientific and procedural potential in educational institutions; organization and development of international relations in the education sector and so forth. Currently there are 36 state-run and 15 private universities in Azerbaijan. The ministry-released reports state that in 2009 20,953 undergraduate students and 3,526 graduate students entered in universities nationwide. Currently, there are 104,925 undergraduate and graduate students, studying in higher education institutions, excluding the specialized higher education schools. Universities employ 11,566 professors and 12,616 faculty members in the country.

== Publications ==
Azerbaijan Journal of Educational Studies
- Discipline: Education
- Language: Azerbaijani, English, Russian, Turkish
- Edited by: Arzu Soltan

Publication details
- Former names: New School (Yeni məktəb); Help to Teacher (Muəllimə kömək)
- History: 1924–present
- Publisher: Ministry of Education (Azerbaijan)
- Frequency: Quarterly

Standard abbreviations
- ISO 4: Azerbaijan J. Educ. Stud.

Indexing
- ISSN: 0134-3289 (print); 2617-8060 (web)
- LCCN: 2005203402
- OCLC no.: 9540714

Links
- Journal homepage; Online access

The Ministry of Education publishes the Azerbaijan Journal of Educational Studies (Azerbaijani: Azərbaycan məktəbi), a quarterly peer-reviewed open-access academic journal. Articles are published in Azerbaijani, Russian, English, Turkish. It was originally established in 1924 as New School (Azerbaijani: Yeni məktəb), and was renamed Help to Teacher (Azerbaijani: Muəllimə kömək) in 1930, before obtaining its current name in 1943.

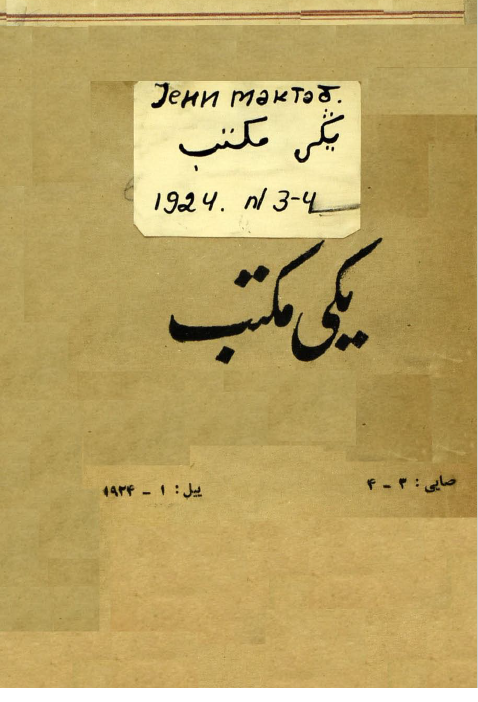
Yeni məktəb, 1925

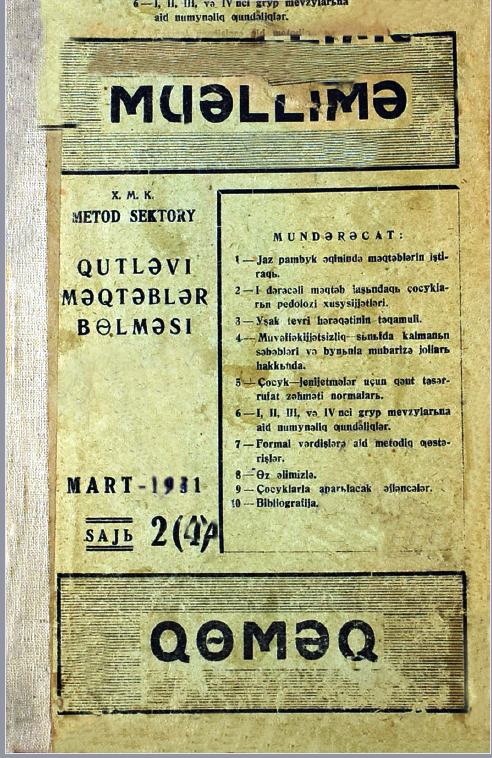
Muəllimə kömək, 1931

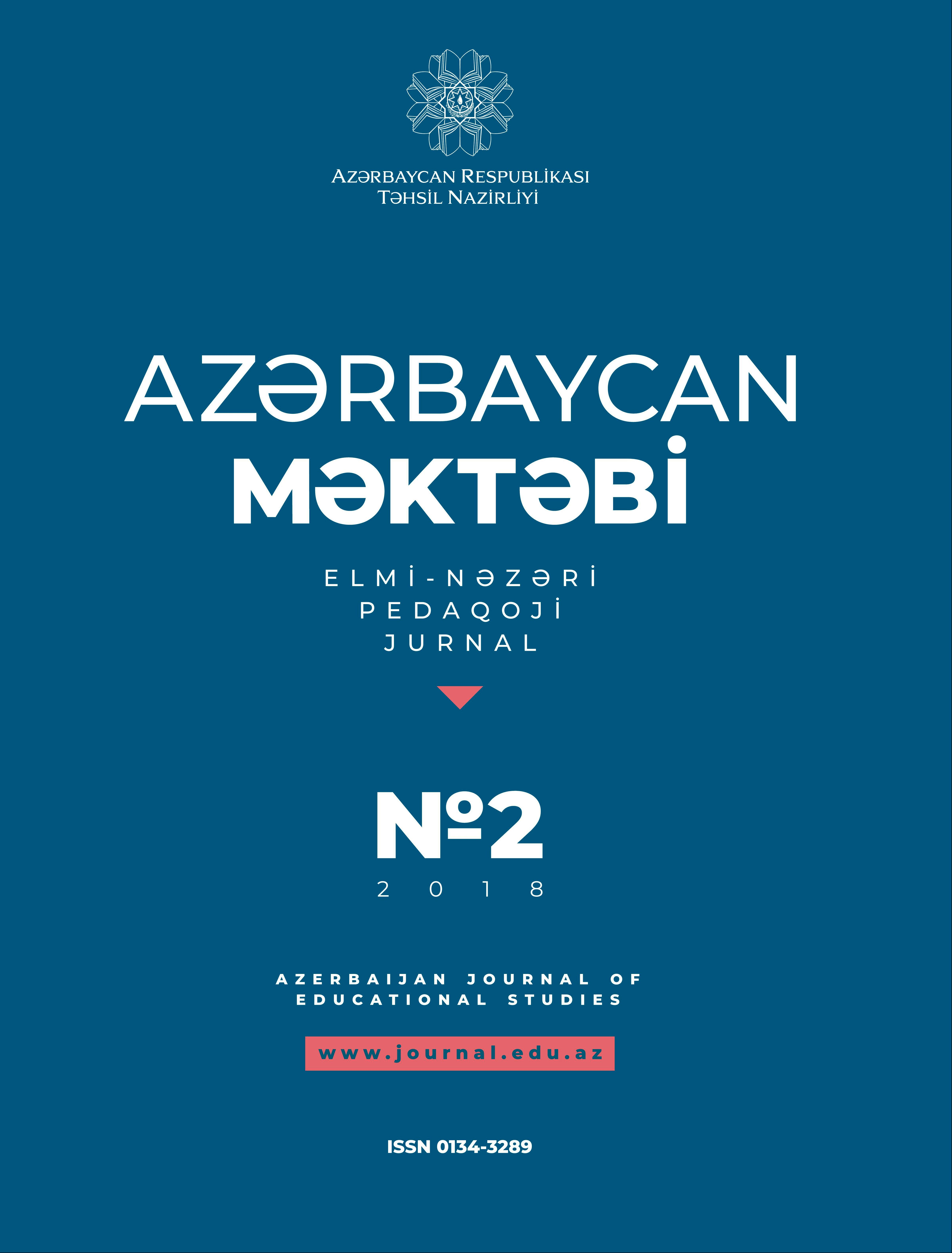
Azərbaycan məktəbi, 2018

== See also ==
- Cabinet of Azerbaijan
- Education in Azerbaijan
