= Tourism and Hospitality Research =

- Discipline: Hospitality management
- Language: English
- Edited by: Clare Weeden

Publication details
- History: 1980–present
- Publisher: SAGE Publications
- Frequency: Quarterly

Standard abbreviations
- ISO 4: Tour. Hosp. Res.

Indexing
- ISSN: 1467-3584 (print); 1742-9692 (web)
- LCCN: 2007210580
- OCLC no.: 45127316

Links
- Journal homepage; Online access; Online archive

Tourism and Hospitality Research is a quarterly peer-reviewed academic journal covering the field of hospitality management. The editor is Marina Novelli (University of Brighton). It was established in 2004 and is published by SAGE Publications.

== Abstracting and indexing ==
The journal is abstracted and indexed in Scopus.
