= Azerbaijan State Marine Academy =

Azerbaijan Higher Educational Institution (since 1996)

- Azərbaycan Dövlət Dəniz Akademiyası
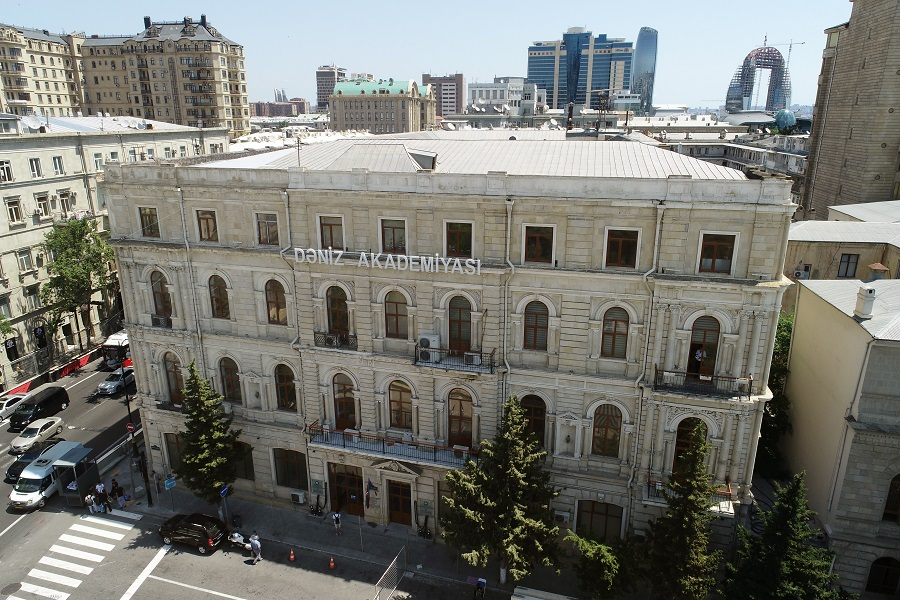
- Type: Public
- Established: 1996
- Rector: Heydar Asadov
- Academic staff: 100
- Students: 1093
- Location: Baku, Azerbaijan; 40°22′13″N 49°50′37″E
- Campus: Urban
- Website: www.adda.edu.az
- Location in Baku, Azerbaijan Azerbaijan State Marine Academy (Azerbaijan) Azerbaijan State Marine Academy (Caucasus Mountains)

Azerbaijan State Marine Academy (ASMA) (Azerbaijani: Azərbaycan Dövlət Dəniz Akademiyası (ADDA)) is a non-profit public university located in Baku, Azerbaijan. The Academy was established in 1996 and is accredited by the Azerbaijan Ministry of Education.

== Graduates ==
Gafur Mammadov-Seeman

Shovkat Salimova-(1940-1944)Azerbaijan's Honor and First Female Captain(1920-1999)
