= Ardahan University =

Public university in Ardahan, Turkey

Coordinates: 41.1070°N 42.7024°E

- Established: 2008
- Location: Ardahan, Turkey
- Colors
- Website: Official website

Ardahan University is a university located in Ardahan, Turkey. It was established in 2008.

== Affiliations ==
The university is a member of the Caucasus University Association.
