= Giga Zedania =

Georgian philosopher

Giga Zedania (Georgian: გიგა ზედანია) is a Georgian philosopher and academic, and also used to be the Rector of Ilia State University. He has published extensively on philosophy and Georgian social and political developments. He ran Ilia State University from 2014 to 2022. Since 2022, Zedania is the director of the Center for Advanced Studies at Ilia State University. He has worked as a council member of the Magna Charta Universitatum Observatory and as the president of the Black Sea University Network. He has also been a fellow at the Open Society Institute, a member of the Shota Rustaveli Science Foundation in Georgia, and since 2022 an Honorary Member of the Leibniz-Zentrum für Literatur- und Kulturforschung.

He holds a Ph.D. in philosophy from the Ruhr University Bochum (Germany), a master's degree from Central European University (Hungary, Budapest), and has previously also studied at Tbilisi State University and for one year at Bard College in the United States.

Among his major publications is Modernization in Georgia: Theories, Discourses and Realities (Peter Lang, 2018). He has previously written on religion and nationalism, and on Georgian and German political thinkers and philosophers.
