= Odlar Yurdu University =

University in Baku, Azerbaijan

- Odlar Yurdu Universiteti
- Rector: Ahmad Valiyev
- Location: Baku, Azerbaijan
- Website: https://www.oyu.edu.az/

Odlar Yurdu University is a private university located in Baku, Azerbaijan. It was founded in 1995, and became a degree granting institution in 1999. The name is based on the official Azeri national motto, Odlar Yurdu, which is translated as "Land of Fire".

Admission to the Master of Business Administration (MBA) Program, established in partnership with Georgia State University (Atlanta, USA). The masters are prepared with the four following concentrations: Finances, International Business, Marketing and General Management.

In 2018, Odlar Yurdu University started a partnership with Nordhausen University of Applied Sciences.
