= Italy-Azerbaijan University =

- Type: Joint university
- Established: 2022
- Parent institution: ADA University; Luiss University; University of Bologna; Politecnico di Milano; Politecnico di Torino; Sapienza University of Rome
- Location: Baku, Azerbaijan; 40°23′37.25″N 49°51′11.74″E
- Campus: Urban
- Website: https://www.ada.edu.az/en/about/Italy-Azerbaijan-university
- Location in Baku, Azerbaijan Italy-Azerbaijan University (Azerbaijan) Italy-Azerbaijan University (Caucasus Mountains)

Italy-Azerbaijan University is a higher education institution established in 2022 through a collaboration between ADA University and five Italian universities: Luiss University, University of Bologna, Politecnico di Milano, Politecnico di Torino, and Sapienza University of Rome. The Italy-Azerbaijan University focuses on disciplines such as design and architecture, agriculture and food sciences, business and engineering, providing a platform for collaborative research, student exchanges, and joint degree programs.

== Background ==
The agreement to establish Italy-Azerbaijan University was signed on 1st September 2022 at the Azerbaijan Embassy in Rome. The ceremony was attended by President Ilham Aliyev, Rector Hafiz Pashayev of ADA University, and Deputy Rector Simona Tondelli from the University of Bologna. This partnership aims to foster knowledge exchange between Azerbaijan and Italy, with a focus on innovation, research, and workforce development in strategic sectors. The University of Bologna is collaborating on the creation of a School of Agricultural and Food Sciences to support Azerbaijan’s agri-food sector.

In 2022, a delegation from Politecnico di Torino, led by Vice-Rector David Chiaramonti, visited Azerbaijan to initiate the development of engineering programs tailored to the country’s technological and infrastructural needs.

At the International Cernobbio Forum on September 6, 2024, President Ilham Aliyev highlighted the university as an example of growing international cooperation between Azerbaijan and Italy. He emphasized that students would benefit from exposure to Italian language, culture, and heritage, fostering future collaboration.

Currently based at ADA University's Baku campus, the university is expanding with two new buildings expected to be completed by September 2025.

== Degree programs ==
- Agricultural and Food Systems Management
- Agricultural Technologies
- Animal Sciences
- Architecture
- Communication Design
- Electrical and Electronic Engineering
- Food Technologies
- Global Management and Politics
- Interior Design
- Urban Planning

== See also ==
- Azerbaijan–Italy relations
