= Qafqaz University =

Private university in Azerbaijan

Coordinates: 40°28′33.77″N 49°43′35.08″E

- Qafqaz Universiteti
- Type: Private
- Established: 1993
- Rector: Havar Memmedov
- Location: Khirdalan, Azerbaijan
- Campus: Urban
- Colours: Blue and White
- Website: http://beu.edu.az

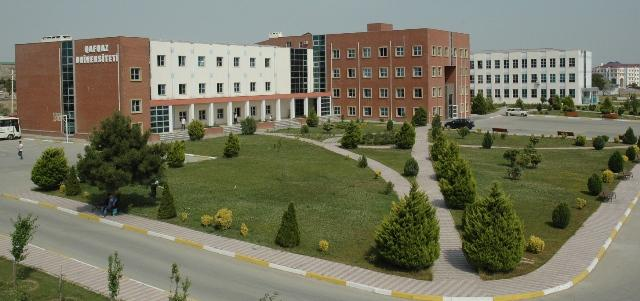
Qafqaz University

Qafqaz University (in Azerbaijani: Qafqaz Universiteti) was a private university located in Baku, Azerbaijan. It was founded in 1993 and was the first and the only foreign private university in the country. On 16 January 2017, it was decided by management to shut down the university.

== History ==
The 'Qafqaz' university was initially established in 1993. In July 2016, it was announced that the Qafqaz university would close.

Thenafter Baku Engineering University was established on November 8, 2016. The establishment of "Baku Engineering University" public legal entity charter has been approved by the decree of the President of the Republic of Azerbaijan on February 21, 2017.

== Mission ==
The university stated that its mission is to give students a university education at international standards and infuse them with enthusiasm to constantly reach for new horizons. Great care was also taken to endow them with a respect for national and universal humane values.

== Campus ==
The University operated in two temporary service buildings in Baku from the day it was founded until the 2003-2004 academic year. However, these buildings of 4000 m^{2} were not sufficient as they were not large enough or technically satisfactory.

The Xırdalan campus area was given to the university with the efforts of the late President Heydar Aliyev. The university relocated to the new premises in the 2003-2004 academic year. The new service building where all the classrooms are situated has a 10500 m^{2} indoor area. This spatial factor was a major contributory element that enabled the university to make a lot of progress. As a result of this, the number of the departments doubled and reached twenty. Student population rose dramatically to 2200. A dormitory building for male students was built in the 2005–2006 academic year. The construction of the building for the Coordinating Unit for Language Teaching and the dormitory for female students also was built.

== Educational system ==
The university was the first and the only educational institution authorized by the Azerbaijani Ministry of Education to have a ‘Distinguished Status’ in applying its own curriculum. Accordingly, the programs of Turkish and Western universities have been taken as a model in preparing the curriculum. In doing so, a ‘credit system’ was put into practice for the first time in Azerbaijan.

The University offered B.A, M.A., M.Sc., MBA, doctoral programs and degree of specialist.

According to Azerbaijani State Student Admission Committee, the university had been the most preferred private university since 1996. Qafqaz University came first among the private universities in filling the student quota given by the Azerbaijani Ministry of Education. In the journal published by the State Student Admission Committee, it was stated that:

Qafqaz University has acquired the best place among the private universities. Also in previous years, it was seen that this educational institution deserved the best rank among all the private universities. At this university there is good organization, students receive close attention, and students who entered the university with high scores benefit from discounts in educational fees. Besides they are granted scholarships. The university always tries to help its graduates find jobs. As a result of these incentives, this university is generally preferred by brilliant and hardworking students who get high scores in the university entrance exam. Four of the students who are granted Presidential Scholarship are from Qafqaz University.

== TOEFL Examinations ==
Qafqaz University was the first institution in Azerbaijan where the TOEFL IBT, new generation TOEFL mock test, could be taken thanks to its high-speed Internet connection.

== International Quality Management Certificate ==
Qafqaz University was the first higher educational institution in Azerbaijan which received the ISO 9001:2000 Quality Management Certificate.

== Sport ==
=== Football ===
Qafqaz University participated in the 2008–09 Azerbaijan First Division, finishing 5th in a league of 8.

== Affiliations ==
The university was a member of the Caucasus University Association.

== See also ==
- Baku "Dede Gorgud" Private Turkish High School
