= Azerbaijan State Agricultural University =

Public university in Azerbaijan

- Azərbaycan Dövlət Aqrar Universiteti
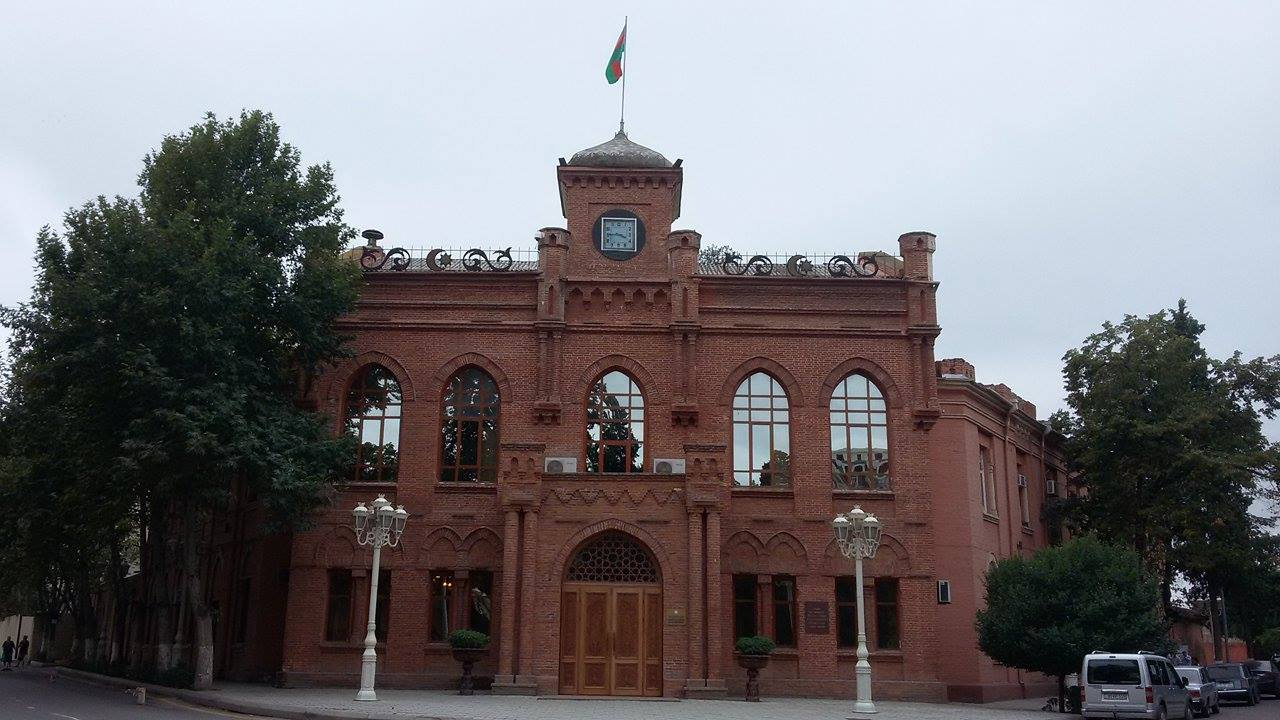
- Type: Public
- Established: 14 November 1920; 103 years ago
- Founder: Nariman Narimanov
- Rector: Zafer Gurbanov
- Faculty: 560
- Students: 6000
- Location: Ganja, Azerbaijan
- Campus: Urban
- Colors: Emerald green
- Website: adau.edu.az

Azerbaijan State Agricultural University (Azerbaijani: Azərbaycan Dövlət Aqrar Universiteti, literally "Azerbaijan State Agricultural University"), also referred to as the Azerbaijan State Agricultural University (Az. AA), is a public university located in Ganja, Azerbaijan. The university has eight schools, 6000 students and 560 faculty members. In addition, there is a teaching site in Gazakh with nearly 500 correspondent students.

== History ==
Azerbaijan State Agricultural University traces its history to the Baku Polytechnical Institute's Department of Agriculture, which was established on November 14, 1920. Originally located in Baku, the school was originally formed in 1920 after the invasion of the Red Army and the establishment of the fledgling Azerbaijan SSR. The new government decreed that the previous technical school, Baku Polytechnicum, would close and be replaced by Baku Polytechnical Institute, a more traditional polytechnic institute. The new school focused on training engineers in a broad range of industries: agriculture, civil engineering, electromechanical, economics and oil. The new school went through many name changes over the years as its emphasis changed to meet the needs of Azerbaijan. In 1923, the school changed its name to Azerbaijan Polytechnical Institute. In March 1929, the Azerbaijan Communist Party decreed that the school be split into three independent schools covering agriculture, economics and oil.

Today, the university is the only state school in Azerbaijan that offers a university-level degree for the agricultural sector.

== Rectors ==
In its rich history, the University was led by the following rectors;

- Dadaş Xoca oğlu Bünyadzadə
- İslam Məhəmməd oğlu Datıyev
- Hüseyn Məmməd oğlu Musayev
- Yusif Paşa oğlu Tahirov
- Əzim Asəf oğlu Dadaşov
- Mövsüm Musa oğlu Poladzadə
- Soltan Abbas oğlu Mirzəyev
- Bala Məmməd oğlu Ağayev
- Məmməd Əsəd oğlu Mehdiyev
- Niyaz Əli oğlu Səfərov
- Bəhmən Bəhrəm oğlu Xəlilov
- Raul Abdulla oğlu Qədimov
- Zaur Nəcəf oğlu Eminbəyli
- Məmmədtağı İbrahim oğlu Cəfərov
- Mirdaməd Mirsadıq oğlu Sadıqov
- İbrahim Həsən oğlu Cəfərov

Former rector Memmedtaghi Jafarov (Azerbaijani: Məmmədtağı İbrahim oğlu Cəfərov) died, and his replacement was appointed in 2008. Currently, Zafer Gurbanov is leding the University. He is the former vice-rector of Baku Higher Oil School.

== Building ==
The main building of Azerbaijan State Agricultural University, located at 276 Atatürk Street, was built in 1897. “Zemstvo” office called DUMA was settled there. In 1908, the building was turned into the residence of the Governor of Elizavetpol Governorate. Azerbaijan Democratic Republic operated in this building in 1918 when the capital was Ganja. The meetings of the Parliament of ADR were held in this building formerly. The ADR museum is located in the nearby building, built in the ancient historical-architectural style.

== See also ==
- Ganja, Azerbaijan
- Azerbaijan Technical University
