= Baku Engineering University =

Higher education institution in Azerbaijan

- Bakı Mühəndislik Universiteti
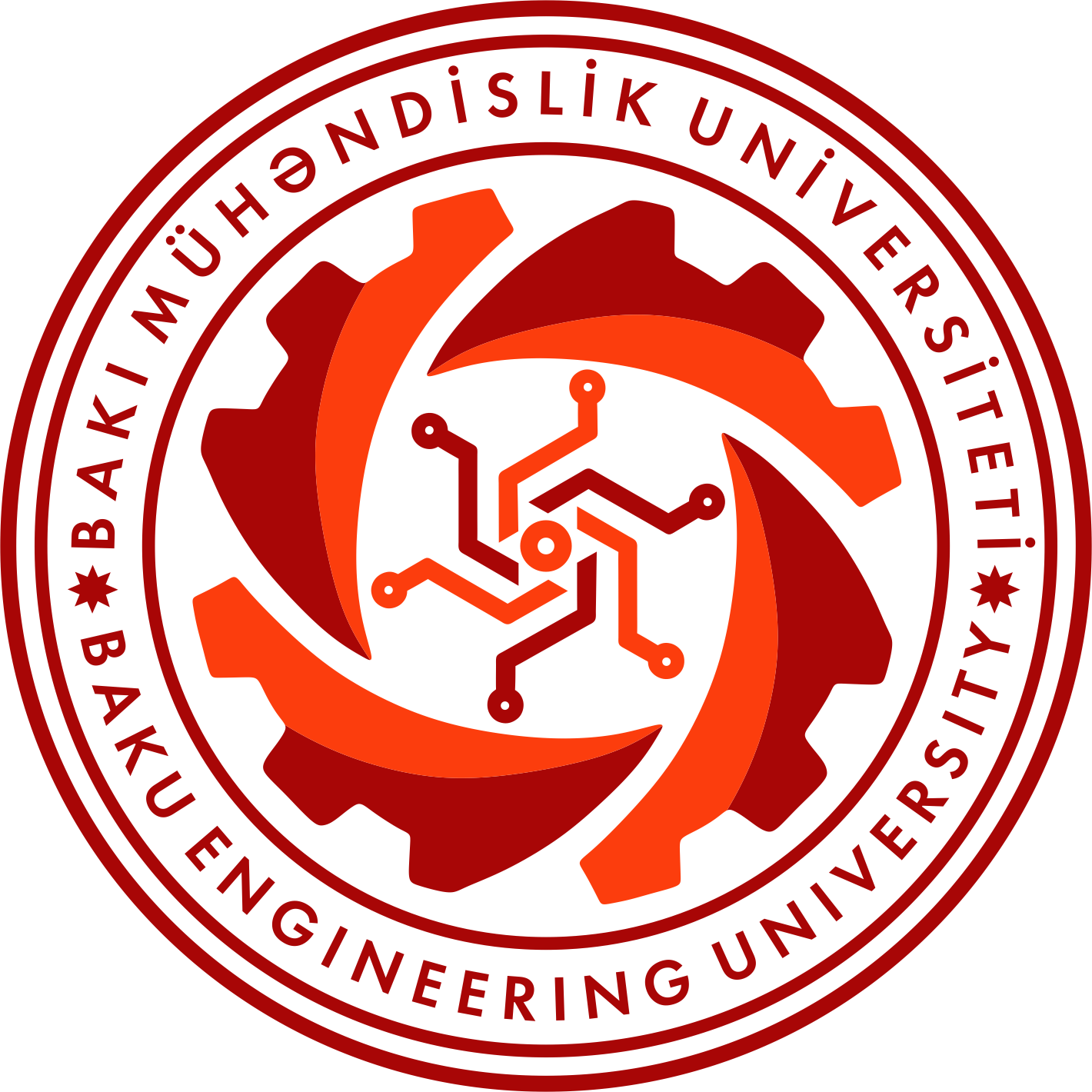
- Type: Public legal entity
- Established: 2016
- Rector: Yagub Piriyev
- Location: Hasan Aliyev str. 120, Baku, AZ0101, Azerbaijan; 40.4737°N 49.728°E
- Campus: Rural
- Language: English, Azerbaijani, Russian
- Website: http://beu.edu.az/
- Location within Azerbaijan

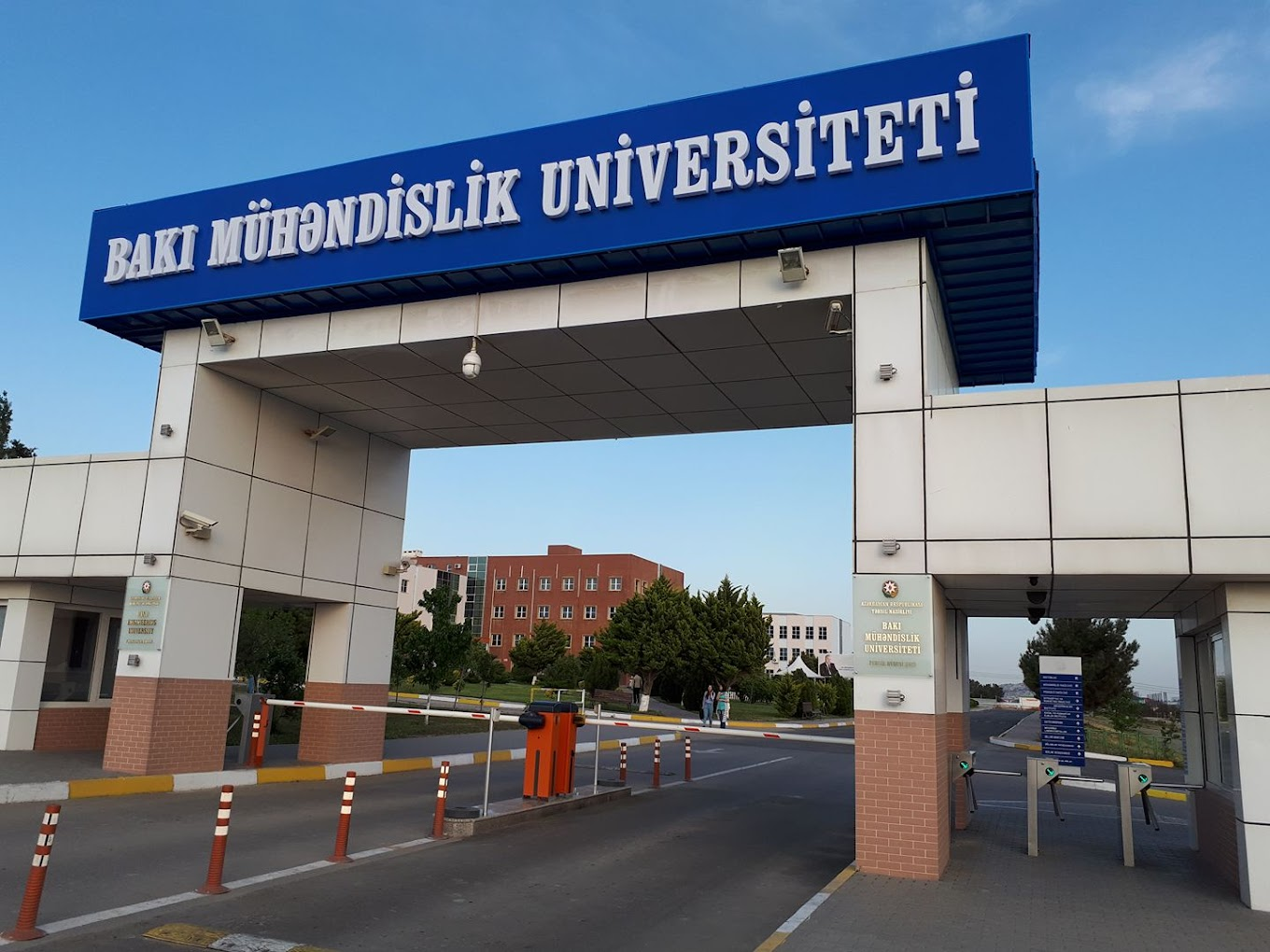
The main gate of Baku Engineering University

Baku Engineering University (Azerbaijani: Bakı Mühəndislik Universiteti) is a higher education institution which functions as a public legal entity under the Ministry of Education of Azerbaijan Republic. Baku Engineering University's mission is "to prepare engineers at all levels of higher education, execute programs of higher and additional education in this sphere, and conduct fundamental and applied scientific research."

University rankings

Global – Overall
- QS World: 851-900 (2027)

Regional – Overall
- QS Emerging Europe and Central Asia: 401-450 (2022)

== History ==
Baku Engineering University was established by the order of the President of the Republic of Azerbaijan on November 8, 2016. The establishment of the "Baku Engineering University" public legal entity charter was approved by the decree of the President of the Republic of Azerbaijan on February 21, 2017. Minister of Education Mikayil Jabbarov visited Baku Engineering University on 3 April 2017.

== Education ==
The establishment of the University aims to improve the teaching of engineering technologies and prepare highly qualified personnel for the industry. Specialties in Bachelor, Master and Doctorate levels are taught in Azerbaijani, English and Russian languages. Admission to the university is held in four faculties.

1. Faculty of Engineering
2. Faculty of Economic and Administrative Sciences
3. Faculty of Architecture and Construction
4. Faculty of Information and Computer Technologies

Baku Engineering University operates on a campus located in Absheron. The total area of the Campus is 200,000 m2.

== Dual degree programs ==
=== Inha University ===
The program is based on the 3+1 model. Under the dual degree program, students study for 3 academic years at Baku Engineering University (BEU) and the final academic year (the last course) at Inha University in South Korea. At the end of the 4 years, students receive two diplomas. The entire program is fully funded by the state for the 4-year duration. As part of the program, students are also expected to participate in a 3-week summer school in South Korea at the end of their second year. Furthermore, students who complete their bachelor’s degree have the opportunity to continue their master’s and doctoral studies in South Korea with scholarships.

At BEU, students study in English for 3 years (with some courses in Azerbaijani), while at Inha University, they spend 1 year studying in Korean. To ensure that students acquire the necessary language skills, Korean language courses are provided as part of the program during their 3 years at BMU. Students will also take exams during their second and third academic years to obtain the "TOPIK" (Test of Proficiency in Korean) certificate. Students who pass these exams successfully will continue their studies in Korean at Inha University in their fourth academic year.

=== Beijing University of Chemical Technology (BUCT) ===
The program is implemented at the bachelor’s degree level. According to the program, students complete the first two academic years of their studies at BEU, and the following two academic years at Beijing University of Chemical Technology (BUCT). Students who successfully complete the program are awarded a bachelor’s diploma in accordance with the regulations of both higher education institutions. In addition, short-term and long-term summer and winter exchange programs for students are also implemented between the parties.

=== Beijing University of Civil Engineering and Architecture (BUCEA) ===
The program is implemented at the master’s degree level. Under this program, students complete part of their studies at Baku Engineering University and the remaining part at Beijing University of Civil Engineering and Architecture (BUCEA) based on the 0.5+2.5 model, which includes 0.5 year at BEU and 2.5 years at BUCEA, or the 1+2 model, which includes 1 year at BEU and 2 years at BUCEA. Students who successfully complete the program are awarded a master’s degree or diploma in accordance with the requirements of the partner institutions. In addition, short-term and long-term summer and winter exchange programs for students are also implemented between the parties.

== Rectors ==
The current rector of Baku Engineering University is Yaqub Piriyev, who was appointed to this position by the decree of the President of the Republic of Azerbaijan, Ilham Aliyev, on September 13, 2023.

Prior to him, the university was led by Havar Mammadov from 2017 to 2023.

== Alumni ==
- Vusal Nasirli – Deputy Minister of Labor and Social Protection of the Population of the Republic of Azerbaijan
- Khatayi Aliyev – Scholar in Economics
- Shahin Aliyev – Deputy Chairman of the Board of the State Social Protection Fund
