= Zakir Mammadov =

Zakir Jabbar Bey oglu Mammadov (Azerbaijani: Məmmədov Zakir Cabbar bəy oğlu) (August 16, 1936 — March 2, 2003) was a correspondent member (associate member) of Azerbaijan National Academy of Sciences and Doctor in Philosophy. Mammadov specialized in Eastern philosophy, and focused mostly on the history of Azerbaijani philosophy. He had refuted the thesis ‘no professional philosopher lived in Azerbaijan in Middle Ages except for Bahmanyar’.

== Life ==
Mammadov was born in Seyidli, Aghdam on August 16, 1936. His mother was Husnu Murtuza bey qizi Mammadbeyova, and his father Jabbar bey Ismayil bey oglu Valibeyov. His father was a descendant of the Baharli tribe.

Mammadov grew up under political persecution and used his mother's surname. His last name was Mammadov, not Mammadbeyov.

Mammadov graduated from secondary school No.1 of Agdam earning medal and entered Arabic philology section, recently established within Faculty of Oriental Studies of Azerbaijan State University (now Baku State University). While Mammadov was first year student, i.e. on 29 November 1957 his father Jabbar bey was exonerated by the decision of Supreme Court of Azerbaijan SSR.

While studying at university he was awarded certificate of merit by Az.LKGI for excellence in education and public work. He published verses and translations from Arabic on university newspaper with large editions. Having learnt Arabic from Alasgar Mammadov, great personality, polyglot scholar, and founder of Arabic studies in Azerbaijan, Mammadov graduated from university in 1962.

In August of that year Mammadov embarked on working as junior research fellow in Institute of Oriental Studies of ANAS. From September 1962 to September 1963 he was the first Azerbaijani interpreter who worked in construction of Aswan dam in Egypt (UAR). Having learnt local dialect in a year he also collected rich scientific literature in Arabic. Upon return to his motherland he started teaching Egyptian dialect first time in Azerbaijan State University (now Baku State University) and due to his scientific interest toward books obtained about Eastern philosophy began working in Philosophy section of Azerbaijan AS (now Institute of Philosophy and Law of ANAS).

Mammadov died on March 2, 2003. Mammadov's life and writings were broadly depicted in Orkhan Mammadov's book titled ‘Agdam’s renowned pedagogues and scholars’. At the same time more than thirty articles about Mammadov's scientific activities were published in periodical press. Khatira Guliyeva published a monograph called ‘Great Azerbaijani philosopher Mammadov (Baharli)’ with reference to his life and writings.

== Scientific activity ==
Mammadov attained philosophical specialty ‘science of the sciences’ in Azerbaijani language and Arabic philology through working present-day Institute of Philosophy and Law since January 1, 1964.

Hereby Mammadov revealed the richness of our national philosophical legacy thank to his knowledge of Eastern languages and philosophy, because till his researches it was supposed that no professional philosopher lived in the East, Bahmanyar who left few materials among his works in our hand is exception. Through approximately forty years Mammadov carried out explorations, revealed Azerbaijani philosophers’ and thinkers’ (who wrote in Eastern languages) rich legacy published in various countries of the world, as well as preserved as manuscript, worked out their philosophy (theory of existence and knowledge theory), logic, socio-political and ethical views.

Philosophy turned out to be ‘bondmaid of theology’ in Christian world in Middle Ages which is considered the age of ignorance and unawareness, there was not scientific philosophy, only scholasticism and mysticism were poorly spread. Mammadov proved that, along with religious philosophy, scientific philosophy existed in the East and also Azerbaijan at that time. He found out that one of three essential scientific philosophical doctrines – Eastern Peripateticism was founded by Turkic philosopher Al-Farabi (873-950), the other two ones, Pantheism and Illuminationism were founded by Ayn al-Quzat Miyanedji (1099–1131) and Shahab al-Din Suhrawardi (1154–1191) respectively.

Doctrines of skilful Azerbaijani philosophers became pattern for talented philosophers throughout ages in Moslem countries of the East by growing into philosophical schools. Their ideas didn't confine to Islamic world and later spread across European countries as well.

In a word, history of world philosophy didn't lack scientific philosophical vision owing to the East, particularly Azerbaijani philosophers in Middle Ages (for the duration of thousand years). All these were expressed by Mammadov in more than thirty books (published and not published) and 250 articles.

In 1969 Mammadov succeeded the defence of his postgraduate dissertation ‘Sirajeddin Urmavi’s logical views’ which he had completed in 1967. Although his doctoral thesis ‘11-13th Centuries Philosophical Thinking in Azerbaijan’, which had been completed in 1974 was published as a book in 1978, he accomplished the defence 16 years later.

Having founded the section for history of Eastern philosophy in 1997 Mammadov chaired the section till the end of his life. He was elected corresponding member (associate member) of Azerbaijan National Academy of Sciences in 2001.

Mammadov worked in the post of academic editor (part-time) for Azerbaijan Soviet Encyclopaedia from 1969 to 1970, made efforts so that materials concerning our national philosophy were widely incorporated into encyclopaedia. Azerbaijan's professional philosophers were included in this ten volume work only attributable to him.

Moreover, Mammadov engaged in pedagogical activities, taught philosophy, history of Azerbaijani philosophy and history of Eastern philosophy in higher education institutions. Mammadov was a member of expert council on ‘History, theology, philosophy, psychology and pedagogical sciences’ of High Attestation Commission under President of the Republic since 1997.

Because Mammadov's whole researches were based on primary sources, he did his utmost for bringing those works to Azerbaijan. Till his researches Bahmanyar's two small size treatises ‘The Subject of Metaphysics’ and ‘Degrees of Beings’ had been known. The researcher revealed his large size work ‘Education’ (Kitab at-tahsil). Due to his numerous requests from related organizations the treatise was brought into Azerbaijan. Thus the scholar incorporated the entire ‘Education’ into research first time.

Along with treatises ‘The Subject of Metaphysics’ and ‘Degrees of Beings’ Bahmanyar's ‘Education’ (Kitab at-tahsil) was fully translated into Azerbaijani. Small part of ‘Education’ (Kitab at-tahsil) and two other treatises were completely published in his book titled ‘Eastern philosophy (9-12th centuries)’ (BDU publishing, 1999).

Mammadov was acquiring the Eastern, especially Azerbaijani philosophers’ works, microfilms of unique manuscripts, printed copies mostly at the expense of his own and sometimes his friends’ allowances to order. In Azerbaijan he was the only scholar that researched the doctrines of Eastern philosophers comprehensively and extendedly on the basis of those sources. Besides researching the legacy of our world-famous philosophers he also sought for their public recognition.

On Mammadov's initiative the Presidium of Azerbaijan Academy of Sciences adopted decision on commemoration of 800th anniversary of Shihab al-Din Suhrawardi, the founder of Illuminationism on April 2, 1991. In accordance with this decision the jubilee of illuminationist philosopher was marked in Institute of Philosophy and Law (now Institute of Philosophy, Sociology and Law) on 25 December 1991.

While Mammadov, the only researcher of Shihab al-Din Suhrawardi's philosophical legacy translated his numerous treatises into Azerbaijani, merely two of them were issued. The researcher translated Shihab al-Din Suhrawardi's ‘Philosophers’ creed ’ into Azerbaijani and Russian in cooperation with Tariyel Hasanov and this translation was published initially in 1986 and second time in 1999. By translating philosopher’s treatise ‘The Temples of Light (Hayakal al-Nur)’ Mammadov published it initially in 1989 and second time in 1999 with his own fund.

Upon Z.Mammadov's initiative the Presidium of Azerbaijan AS and Cabinet of Ministers adopted decision on the commemoration of the 1000th anniversary of Bahmanyār’s birth in 1993. On this occasion three scientific sessions were held in Institute of Philosophy and Law and conferences in a number of higher education institutions.

Upon Mammadov’s initiative the Presidium of Azerbaijan AS adopted decision on the 800th anniversary of Sirajeddin Urmavi’s birth in 1998. He made up articles with regard to the 800th anniversary of Afzaladdin Xunaji and Sirajeddin Urmavi’s birth and to the 900th anniversary of Ayn al-Quzat Miyanedji and published them in journal and newspapers.

Mammadov attended a variety of scientific sessions, conferences in Baku, Tashkent, Samarkand, Fergana and Dushanbe. He gave a talk in 5th (1968) and 12th (1975) scientific sessions of Azerbaijan AS’s Coordination Council, academic conference dedicated to methodological issues and development history of Transcaucasian peoples’ medieval philosophy and session devoted to the 700th anniversary of Ottoman Empire (1999). He delivered speeches regarding the anniversaries of scientific and cultural coryphaeus – Al-Farabi, Avicenna, Nizami Ganjavi, Nasimi, Abbasgulu Bakikhanov, Mirza Fatali Akhundov, Muhammad al-Bukhari and Ahmad Fargani. He was elected member of State Jubilee Commission organizing the Nasir al-Din al-Tusi’s 800th anniversary.

‘History of Azerbaijan Philosophy’, Mammadov's masterpiece of great importance among his writings is an outline of his researches concerning Azerbaijani philosophers’ and thinkers’ rich philosophical legacy revealed by him for more than thirty years. The book traces the development path of Azerbaijani philosophy's history. Ideological trends, doctrines, vision of their Azerbaijani proponents are analysed in the context of Eastern philosophical thinking. It is shown that though merely religious philosophy (mysticism and scholasticism) was spread in Christian world during feudalism, there existed non-religious philosophical doctrines such as pantheism and Illuminationism founded by Azerbaijani philosophers, as well as East Peripateticism in Muslim countries and these enriched philosophical history of the mankind.

Mammadov is the author of more than forty articles in ten-volume Azerbaijan Soviet Encyclopaedia, of second volume of ‘History of Azerbaijan’ in seven volumes (the chapter titled philosophy), of second volume of ‘History of Azerbaijani literature’ in six volumes, and of some articles in ‘Philosophical Encyclopaedic Dictionary’. He is the author of textbook called ‘Philosophy’ and syllabus ‘History of Philosophy’ taught at schools. Worshipper

‘Eastern philosophy (11-12th centuries)’. (Baku, BSU publishing, 1999). Mammadov engaged in translation as well, translating first time into Azerbaijani language the pearls of the world philosophy - Yakub Kindi's treatise ‘The first philosophy ‘, excerpts from Abulhasan Askeri's work ‘Muslims’ views and the diversity in worshippers’ opinions’, Farabi's book ‘Meanings of the Intellect’, the physics part of Ibn Sina's ‘The Book of Knowledge (Danishnama-i alai)’, ‘The Book of Politics. Treatise on Ethics (Ilm-al-akhlaq)’, the logic excerpt of Bahmanyar's ‘Education Book’, treatises ‘Subject of Metaphysics’ and the ‘Degrees of Beings’, the excerpts from Gazzali's ‘Rescuer from Error (al-Munqidh min al-dalal)’ treatise, the extracts from Ayn al-Quzat Miyanedji's treatise ‘The essence of the truth’, selected excerpts from Abu Hafs Umar al-Suhrawardi’s book ‘Contribution of the Knowledge’ and the other works and incorporated them to the collection ‘Eastern philosophy (11-12th centuries)’ (Baku, BSU publishing, 1999).

Mammadov's books were used by the scientists who wrote works not only in the field of philosophy, but also law, literature and history. His translations from medieval philosophers’ and thinkers’ works are within the sources for researchers’ studies.

== Bibliography ==
- 11-13th Centuries Philosophical Thinking in Azerbaijan. Baku, 1978
- Bahmanyar's philosophy. Baku, 1983
- Azerbaijan philosophers and thinkers of the Middle Ages. Baku, 1986
- Sirajeddin Urmavi. Baku, 1990
- Shihab al-Din Suhrawardi. Baku, 1991
- Ayn al-Quzat Miyanedji. Baku, 1992
- History of Azerbaijan Philosophy. Baku, 1994; 2006
- Nizami Ganjavi's philosophical thoughts. Baku, 2000
- Shihab al-Din Suhrawardi (life, writings and vision). Baku, 2009

== See also ==
- List of Azeris
