= Results of the 2015 Azerbaijani parliamentary election by constituency =

The results of the 2015 parliamentary elections in Azerbaijan by constituency. The ruling New Azerbaijan Party won 69 of the 125 seats in the National Assembly amidst an opposition boycott.

Constituency	Candidate	Party	Votes
1. Şərur-Sədərək	Etibar Məmmədov	Whole Azerbaijan Popular Front Party	1,330
1. Şərur-Sədərək	Mirvəli Seyidov	Independent	1,880
1. Şərur-Sədərək	Vasif Talibov	New Azerbaijan Party	27,075
2. Şərur	Həsən Ağayev	Whole Azerbaijan Popular Front Party	2,849
2. Şərur	Mustafa Eyvazov	Independent	3,258
2. Şərur	İsa Həbibbəyli	New Azerbaijan Party	25,233
3. Babək-Kəngərli̇-Naxçivan	Meydan Babayev	Justice Party	127
3. Babək-Kəngərli̇-Naxçivan	Nurəddin Bayramov	Classic Popular Front Party	165
3. Babək-Kəngərli̇-Naxçivan	Hüseynqulu Bədəlov	Great Order Party	2,270
3. Babək-Kəngərli̇-Naxçivan	Səttar Möhbaliyev	Independent	27,427
3. Babək-Kəngərli̇-Naxçivan	Nəriman Quliyev	Whole Azerbaijan Popular Front Party	3,081
4. Naxçivan Şəhər	Abdulla Abdullayev	Civic Solidarity Party	66
4. Naxçivan Şəhər	Faiq Əliyev	Party of Hope	36
4. Naxçivan Şəhər	Eldar İbrahimov	New Azerbaijan Party	27,953
4. Naxçivan Şəhər	Tural Mirzəyev	Great Order Party	1,639
4. Naxçivan Şəhər	Cəmil Quliyev	Independent	3,743
5. Şahbuz-Babək	Nadir Allahverdiyev	Musavat	46
5. Şahbuz-Babək	Siyavuş Novruzov	New Azerbaijan Party	18,341
5. Şahbuz-Babək	Ramil Qənbərov	Whole Azerbaijan Popular Front Party	1,987
5. Şahbuz-Babək	Arzu Qurbanov	Independent	2,467
6. Culfa-Babək	Mətanət Əliyeva	Independent	2,466
6. Culfa-Babək	Ülviyyə Həmzəyeva	New Azerbaijan Party	21,192
6. Culfa-Babək	Amil Hüseynzadə	Great Order Party	59
6. Culfa-Babək	Fətəli İmanov	Whole Azerbaijan Popular Front Party	784
6. Culfa-Babək	Abdulla Məhərrəmov	Independent	2,220
7. Ordubad-Culfa	Qüdrət Həsənquliyev	Whole Azerbaijan Popular Front Party	20,581
7. Ordubad-Culfa	Niyazi Quliyev	Independent	3,073
7. Ordubad-Culfa	Əyyar Səfərov	Great Order Party	1,888
7. Ordubad-Culfa	Təvəkgül Süleymanli	Classic Popular Front Party	311
8. Bi̇nəqədi̇ Bi̇ri̇nci̇	Dürdanə Aslanzadə	Great Order Party	2,146
8. Bi̇nəqədi̇ Bi̇ri̇nci̇	Yalçin Balaoğlanov	Independent	543
8. Bi̇nəqədi̇ Bi̇ri̇nci̇	Aysel Əlizadə	Independent	1,486
8. Bi̇nəqədi̇ Bi̇ri̇nci̇	Aysel Əlizadə	New Azerbaijan Party	4,493
8. Bi̇nəqədi̇ Bi̇ri̇nci̇	Azay Quliyev	Independent	15,839
8. Bi̇nəqədi̇ Bi̇ri̇nci̇	Ələsgər Qurbanov	Independent	462
9. Bi̇nəqədi̇ İki̇nci̇	Həbib Ələkbərov	National Revival Movement Party	582
9. Bi̇nəqədi̇ İki̇nci̇	Elşad Musayev	Great Azerbaijan Party	2,076
9. Bi̇nəqədi̇ İki̇nci̇	Akif Naği	Independent	1,620
9. Bi̇nəqədi̇ İki̇nci̇	Əli Orucov	Azerbaijan National Independence Party	768
9. Bi̇nəqədi̇ İki̇nci̇	Kamaləddin Qafarov	New Azerbaijan Party	13,206
9. Bi̇nəqədi̇ İki̇nci̇	Salman Umudov	Independent	910
10. Bi̇nəqədi̇ Üçüncü	Gülağa Aslanli	Musavat	487
10. Bi̇nəqədi̇ Üçüncü	Qaryağdi Əsədov	Independent	412
10. Bi̇nəqədi̇ Üçüncü	Samirə Həsənova	New Azerbaijan Party	2,806
10. Bi̇nəqədi̇ Üçüncü	Elşən Manafov	National Revival Movement Party	255
10. Bi̇nəqədi̇ Üçüncü	Madər Musayev	Independent	15,728
10. Bi̇nəqədi̇ Üçüncü	Bünyamin Qəmbərli	Whole Azerbaijan Popular Front Party	296
10. Bi̇nəqədi̇ Üçüncü	Natiq Qocayev	Independent	162
11. Qaradağ	Bəybala Əbil	Classic Popular Front Party	3,227
11. Qaradağ	Samir Əsədli	Civic Solidarity Party	1,320
11. Qaradağ	Aydin Hüseynov	New Azerbaijan Party	19,154
11. Qaradağ	Akif Nəcəfli	Musavat	960
11. Qaradağ	Ağaəmi Soltanov	Great Order Party	1,085
12. Qaradağ-Bi̇nəqədi̇-Yasamal	Adgözəl Balayev	Independent	1,608
12. Qaradağ-Bi̇nəqədi̇-Yasamal	Natiq Cəfərov	Independent	1,323
12. Qaradağ-Bi̇nəqədi̇-Yasamal	İlqar Əliyev	Justice Party	1,123
12. Qaradağ-Bi̇nəqədi̇-Yasamal	Təhməz Məmmədov	Social Democratic Party	1,039
12. Qaradağ-Bi̇nəqədi̇-Yasamal	Vahid Quliyev	Independent	1,338
12. Qaradağ-Bi̇nəqədi̇-Yasamal	Mixail Zabelin	New Azerbaijan Party	19,464
13. Xəzər-Pi̇rallahi	Vüqar Bağirli	Independent	1,621
13. Xəzər-Pi̇rallahi	Qoşqar Əkbərov	Independent	997
13. Xəzər-Pi̇rallahi	Rauf Əliyev	New Azerbaijan Party	25,505
13. Xəzər-Pi̇rallahi	Tenqiz Əliyev	Independent	268
13. Xəzər-Pi̇rallahi	Namus İskəndərov	Independent	662
13. Xəzər-Pi̇rallahi	Şadiman Nərimansoy	Independent	1,518
13. Xəzər-Pi̇rallahi	Niyaz Nəsirov	Musavat	1,253
13. Xəzər-Pi̇rallahi	Kamran Tağiyev	Independent	768
14. Xəzər	Tərlan Abasov	Independent	291
14. Xəzər	Mehriban Aliyeva	New Azerbaijan Party	38,029
14. Xəzər	Nurlan Əzimov	Independent	180
14. Xəzər	Şöhlə Hüseynova	Whole Azerbaijan Popular Front Party	370
14. Xəzər	Səyyarə Xələfli	Independent	439
15. Yasamal Bi̇ri̇nci̇	Bayram Aslanov	New Azerbaijan Party	755
15. Yasamal Bi̇ri̇nci̇	Əli Əliyev	Citizen and Development Party	570
15. Yasamal Bi̇ri̇nci̇	Garay Əsədov	Independent	272
15. Yasamal Bi̇ri̇nci̇	Nişat Mehdiyev	Independent	1,023
15. Yasamal Bi̇ri̇nci̇	Isa Gambar	Musavat	586
15. Yasamal Bi̇ri̇nci̇	Ülvi Quliyev	Independent	16,431
15. Yasamal Bi̇ri̇nci̇	Vəfa Rüstəm	Independent	543
15. Yasamal Bi̇ri̇nci̇	Ramil Rüstəmov	Independent	262
16. Yasamal İki̇nci̇	Fəxrəddin Babayev	Independent	1,122
16. Yasamal İki̇nci̇	Çingiz Bayramov	Independent	1,435
16. Yasamal İki̇nci̇	Şövqi Bunyatov	Independent	287
16. Yasamal İki̇nci̇	Elşən Həsənov	Independent	1,735
16. Yasamal İki̇nci̇	Xidir İbrahimov	New Azerbaijan Party	3,472
16. Yasamal İki̇nci̇	Tufan Kərim	AMDEP	481
16. Yasamal İki̇nci̇	Aytən Mustafayeva	Independent	11,641
16. Yasamal İki̇nci̇	Mütəllim Rəhimov	Justice Party	464
16. Yasamal İki̇nci̇	Taleh Şahsuvarov	Independent	831
16. Yasamal İki̇nci̇	Nisəxanim Vəliyeva	Classic Popular Front Party	1,114
17. Yasamal Üçüncü	Şahin Abbasov	Citizen and Development Party	399
17. Yasamal Üçüncü	Mehriban Abdullayeva	Independent	943
17. Yasamal Üçüncü	Elşad Həsənov	Independent	11,287
17. Yasamal Üçüncü	Dünyamali İmaməliyev	Whole Azerbaijan Popular Front Party	157
17. Yasamal Üçüncü	Cavad Quliyev	Party for Democratic Reforms	133
17. Yasamal Üçüncü	İlhamiyə Rzayeva	Independent	825
18. Nəri̇manov-Ni̇zami̇	Xanlar Abbasov	Party of Hope	1,043
18. Nəri̇manov-Ni̇zami̇	Vüqar Əliyev	Independent	697
18. Nəri̇manov-Ni̇zami̇	Ramin Hüseynov	Independent	837
18. Nəri̇manov-Ni̇zami̇	İsmayil İsmayilov	New Azerbaijan Party	5,520
18. Nəri̇manov-Ni̇zami̇	Zaur Mehdiyev	Great Order Party	816
18. Nəri̇manov-Ni̇zami̇	Sərvər Məsumov	National Revival Movement Party	786
18. Nəri̇manov-Ni̇zami̇	Rasim Musabayov	Independent	12,250
19. Nəri̇manov Bi̇ri̇nci̇	Ləman Cəfərzadə	Independent	3,550
19. Nəri̇manov Bi̇ri̇nci̇	Felmar Ələkbərov	Civic Solidarity Party	1,634
19. Nəri̇manov Bi̇ri̇nci̇	Ramin Hacili	Party of Hope	1,146
19. Nəri̇manov Bi̇ri̇nci̇	Hikmət Məmmədov	New Azerbaijan Party	1,494
19. Nəri̇manov Bi̇ri̇nci̇	Gülnarə Məmmədova	Independent	12,394
19. Nəri̇manov Bi̇ri̇nci̇	Arif Quliyev	Independent	1,247
19. Nəri̇manov Bi̇ri̇nci̇	Anar Umudov	Independent	2,412
20. Nəri̇manov İki̇nci̇	Yeganə Dilbazi	Whole Azerbaijan Popular Front Party	482
20. Nəri̇manov İki̇nci̇	Svetlana Əkbərova	Independent	1,132
20. Nəri̇manov İki̇nci̇	Adil Əliyev	Independent	13,765
20. Nəri̇manov İki̇nci̇	İbrahim Əsədov	New Azerbaijan Party	4,594
20. Nəri̇manov İki̇nci̇	Aygün Qurbanova	Civic Solidarity Party	357
20. Nəri̇manov İki̇nci̇	Xəzər Teyyublu	Classic Popular Front Party	653
21. Nəsi̇mi̇ Bi̇ri̇nci̇	Tural Abbasli	Musavat	1,250
21. Nəsi̇mi̇ Bi̇ri̇nci̇	Təranə Hüseynova	Independent	1,161
21. Nəsi̇mi̇ Bi̇ri̇nci̇	Məlahət İbrahimqizi	New Azerbaijan Party	14,621
21. Nəsi̇mi̇ Bi̇ri̇nci̇	Fəxrəddin Quliyev	Independent	1,085
21. Nəsi̇mi̇ Bi̇ri̇nci̇	Günel Səfərova	Independent	1,434
22. Nəsi̇mi̇ İki̇nci̇	Aydin Əliyev	Azerbaijan National Independence Party	815
22. Nəsi̇mi̇ İki̇nci̇	Rahib Haciyev	New Azerbaijan Party	3,627
22. Nəsi̇mi̇ İki̇nci̇	Vüsal Həsənov	Independent	926
22. Nəsi̇mi̇ İki̇nci̇	Rəşid Mənsurov	Azerbaijan Democratic Party	1,489
22. Nəsi̇mi̇ İki̇nci̇	Asim Mollazadə	Party for Democratic Reforms	11,274
22. Nəsi̇mi̇ İki̇nci̇	Rasim Ramazanov	Independent	832
22. Nəsi̇mi̇ İki̇nci̇	Rafiq Tağiyev	Independent	772
23. Nəsi̇mi̇-Səbai̇l	Mahir Babayev	Independent	354
23. Nəsi̇mi̇-Səbai̇l	Nazim Haciəlibəyov	Independent	772
23. Nəsi̇mi̇-Səbai̇l	Elşad Novruzov	New Azerbaijan Party	638
23. Nəsi̇mi̇-Səbai̇l	Azər Qasimli	Independent	2,738
23. Nəsi̇mi̇-Səbai̇l	Ziyad Səmədzadə	Independent	14,350
23. Nəsi̇mi̇-Səbai̇l	Afaq Vəliyeva	Whole Azerbaijan Popular Front Party	347
24. Ni̇zami̇ Bi̇ri̇nci̇	Rövnəq Abdullayev	New Azerbaijan Party	20,565
24. Ni̇zami̇ Bi̇ri̇nci̇	Əjdər Əliyev	Great Order Party	1,315
24. Ni̇zami̇ Bi̇ri̇nci̇	Firuzə Hüseynova	Azerbaijan National Independence Party	894
24. Ni̇zami̇ Bi̇ri̇nci̇	Arif Məmmədov	Independent	920
24. Ni̇zami̇ Bi̇ri̇nci̇	Səidə Musayeva	Independent	789
24. Ni̇zami̇ Bi̇ri̇nci̇	Sudeyif Sadixli	Classic Popular Front Party	973
24. Ni̇zami̇ Bi̇ri̇nci̇	Əliyar Şirməmmədov	Citizen and Development Party	842
25. Ni̇zami̇ İki̇nci̇	Elman Abbasov	Party of Hope	775
25. Ni̇zami̇ İki̇nci̇	Lətifə Əzimova	Independent	642
25. Ni̇zami̇ İki̇nci̇	İlqar Həmzəyev	Great Order Party	1,596
25. Ni̇zami̇ İki̇nci̇	Nurəddin İsmayilov	Azerbaijan Democratic Party	692
25. Ni̇zami̇ İki̇nci̇	Zakir Məmmədzadə	Musavat	1,100
25. Ni̇zami̇ İki̇nci̇	Ramil Rüstəmov	Independent	389
25. Ni̇zami̇ İki̇nci̇	Məmmədəli Səfərov	Azerbaijan National Independence Party	982
25. Ni̇zami̇ İki̇nci̇	Sədaqət Vəliyeva	New Azerbaijan Party	13,219
26. Sabunçu Bi̇ri̇nci̇	Kazim Bağirov	Independent	1,068
26. Sabunçu Bi̇ri̇nci̇	Arzuxan Əli-zadə	Azerbaijan National Independence Party	1,281
26. Sabunçu Bi̇ri̇nci̇	Haci Haciyev	Azerbaijan Communist Party	1,118
26. Sabunçu Bi̇ri̇nci̇	Zaur İmanov	Independent	930
26. Sabunçu Bi̇ri̇nci̇	Fazil Mustafa	Great Order Party	12,554
26. Sabunçu Bi̇ri̇nci̇	Kamran Qəribov	New Azerbaijan Party	6,559
27. Sabunçu İki̇nci̇	Aynur Ağayeva	Whole Azerbaijan Popular Front Party	1,770
27. Sabunçu İki̇nci̇	Dilarə Cəbrayilova	New Azerbaijan Party	15,711
27. Sabunçu İki̇nci̇	Vüqar Əhməd	Independent	2,752
27. Sabunçu İki̇nci̇	Elxan Əliyev	Motherland Party	1,847
27. Sabunçu İki̇nci̇	Nəzmiyyə Piriyeva	National Revival Movement Party	1,654
27. Sabunçu İki̇nci̇	Telman Sadiqov	Civic Solidarity Party	1,524
28. Sabunçu Üçüncü	Könül Becanova	Independent	333
28. Sabunçu Üçüncü	Xatirə Cabarova	New Azerbaijan Party	6,809
28. Sabunçu Üçüncü	Yaşar Əsədov	Social Democratic Party	2,708
28. Sabunçu Üçüncü	Eldar Quliyev	Independent	15,511
28. Sabunçu Üçüncü	Bikəxanim Şükürova	Independent	1,948
29. Səbai̇l	Gülnarə Cəfərova	Motherland Party	1,521
29. Səbai̇l	Şəmsəddin Haciyev	New Azerbaijan Party	13,072
29. Səbai̇l	Mahmud İslamov	Party for Democratic Reforms	2,046
29. Səbai̇l	Yaqut İslamova	Justice Party	1,368
29. Səbai̇l	Təranə Məmmədova	Independent	1,565
29. Səbai̇l	Mehman Tanriverdiyev	Great Order Party	1,666
30. Suraxani Bi̇ri̇nci̇	İlhamə Cabbarova	Independent	1,037
30. Suraxani Bi̇ri̇nci̇	Vurğun Əyyub	Independent	1,221
30. Suraxani Bi̇ri̇nci̇	Sevinc Fətəliyeva	New Azerbaijan Party	9,522
30. Suraxani Bi̇ri̇nci̇	Aqşin Gülüşov	Independent	1,097
30. Suraxani Bi̇ri̇nci̇	Misir Mahmudov	Musavat	434
31. Suraxani İki̇nci̇	Zərnişan Abidova	New Azerbaijan Party	4,341
31. Suraxani İki̇nci̇	Mustafa Hacili	Musavat	1,078
31. Suraxani İki̇nci̇	Rauf İsmayilov	Independent	917
31. Suraxani İki̇nci̇	Elvin Məmmədov	Independent	959
31. Suraxani İki̇nci̇	Vüqar Qasimov	Great Azerbaijan Party	731
31. Suraxani İki̇nci̇	Fərəc Quliyev	National Revival Movement Party	5,473
31. Suraxani İki̇nci̇	Rəfail Tağizadə	Party of Hope	662
32. Suraxani Üçüncü	Ağacan Abiyev	New Azerbaijan Party	11,748
32. Suraxani Üçüncü	Ağalar Bayramov	Independent	1,192
32. Suraxani Üçüncü	Namiq Əliyev	Party of Hope	660
32. Suraxani Üçüncü	Arzu Hüseynova	Independent	374
32. Suraxani Üçüncü	Ehtiram Mehtiyev	Independent	255
32. Suraxani Üçüncü	Asəf Məlikov	Independent	495
32. Suraxani Üçüncü	Yuriy Osadçenko	Independent	363
32. Suraxani Üçüncü	Mehriban Zeynalova	Independent	867
33. Xətai̇ Bi̇ri̇nci̇	Məhəmməd Bayramov	Justice Party	371
33. Xətai̇ Bi̇ri̇nci̇	Üzeyir Cəfərov	Independent	1,025
33. Xətai̇ Bi̇ri̇nci̇	Arif Əliyev	Azerbaijan National Independence Party	257
33. Xətai̇ Bi̇ri̇nci̇	Arif Hacili	Musavat	1,799
33. Xətai̇ Bi̇ri̇nci̇	Ruslan İzzətli	Independent	563
33. Xətai̇ Bi̇ri̇nci̇	Hüseynbala Mirələmov	New Azerbaijan Party	12,078
33. Xətai̇ Bi̇ri̇nci̇	Ülkər Musazadə	Independent	690
33. Xətai̇ Bi̇ri̇nci̇	Cavanşir Rzazadə	National Revival Movement Party	266
34. Xətai̇ İki̇nci̇	Əli Ağaevli	Independent	742
34. Xətai̇ İki̇nci̇	Teyyub Əliyev	Whole Azerbaijan Popular Front Party	408
34. Xətai̇ İki̇nci̇	Cəlal İbrahimov	New Azerbaijan Party	4,067
34. Xətai̇ İki̇nci̇	Fuad Muradov	Independent	13,196
34. Xətai̇ İki̇nci̇	Dilşad Nağiyeva	Musavat	547
34. Xətai̇ İki̇nci̇	Elçin Qurbanov	Independent	574
34. Xətai̇ İki̇nci̇	Fəridə Xəlilova	Independent	408
35. Xətai̇ Üçüncü	İqbal Ağa-zadə	Party of Hope	5,068
35. Xətai̇ Üçüncü	Aliyə Ağrili	New Azerbaijan Party	1,444
35. Xətai̇ Üçüncü	Araz Əlizadə	Social Democratic Party	5,650
35. Xətai̇ Üçüncü	İlahə Əmiraslanova	Independent	372
35. Xətai̇ Üçüncü	İntiqam Həsənli	Party for Democratic Reforms	246
35. Xətai̇ Üçüncü	Məhərrəm Hüseynov	Motherland Party	147
35. Xətai̇ Üçüncü	Adigözəl Məmmədov	Independent	224
35. Xətai̇ Üçüncü	Əziz Orucov	Independent	175
36. Xətai̇ Dördüncü	Hamlet Abdullayev	Independent	1,446
36. Xətai̇ Dördüncü	Məcid Əhmədov	Independent	1,453
36. Xətai̇ Dördüncü	Anar Hüseynov	Independent	1,571
36. Xətai̇ Dördüncü	İlham Mürsəlli	Independent	1,286
36. Xətai̇ Dördüncü	Səyavuş Sərdarov	Independent	1,485
36. Xətai̇ Dördüncü	Samad Seyidov	New Azerbaijan Party	17,852
37. Ni̇zami̇ Bi̇ri̇nci̇ (gəncə)	Ələddin Bağirov	Azerbaijan Communist Party	1,377
37. Ni̇zami̇ Bi̇ri̇nci̇ (gəncə)	Elvin Bəkirov	Independent	1,187
37. Ni̇zami̇ Bi̇ri̇nci̇ (gəncə)	Pərvin Kərimzadə	New Azerbaijan Party	9,880
37. Ni̇zami̇ Bi̇ri̇nci̇ (gəncə)	İntizar Qafarova	Independent	917
37. Ni̇zami̇ Bi̇ri̇nci̇ (gəncə)	Müşaidə Qasimova	Independent	568
37. Ni̇zami̇ Bi̇ri̇nci̇ (gəncə)	Seymur Vəliyev	Independent	1,917
38. Ni̇zami̇ İki̇nci̇ (gəncə)	Eldar Aslanov	Azerbaijan National Independence Party	1,419
38. Ni̇zami̇ İki̇nci̇ (gəncə)	Eldar Əliyev	Independent	1,973
38. Ni̇zami̇ İki̇nci̇ (gəncə)	Naqif Həmzəyev	New Azerbaijan Party	11,103
38. Ni̇zami̇ İki̇nci̇ (gəncə)	Zahir Həsənov	Independent	647
38. Ni̇zami̇ İki̇nci̇ (gəncə)	Nigar Həsənova	Independent	255
38. Ni̇zami̇ İki̇nci̇ (gəncə)	Ramil İsmayilov	Independent	564
38. Ni̇zami̇ İki̇nci̇ (gəncə)	Tünzalə Məhərrəmova	Independent	1,172
39. Kəpəz Bi̇ri̇nci̇ (gəncə)	Zümrüd Əliyeva	Independent	2,744
39. Kəpəz Bi̇ri̇nci̇ (gəncə)	Xanlar Fətiyev	New Azerbaijan Party	11,554
39. Kəpəz Bi̇ri̇nci̇ (gəncə)	Kifayət Namazova	Independent	520
39. Kəpəz Bi̇ri̇nci̇ (gəncə)	Əli Quliyev	Independent	2,204
39. Kəpəz Bi̇ri̇nci̇ (gəncə)	Saidə Taği-zadə	Independent	695
39. Kəpəz Bi̇ri̇nci̇ (gəncə)	Əlövsət Veyisov	Azerbaijan Communist Party	2,168
40. Kəpəz İki̇nci̇ (gəncə)	Ətraf Alməmmədov	Azerbaijan Communist Party	2,480
40. Kəpəz İki̇nci̇ (gəncə)	Şövkət Əsədova	Independent	1,972
40. Kəpəz İki̇nci̇ (gəncə)	Vüqar Məlikov	Independent	953
40. Kəpəz İki̇nci̇ (gəncə)	Musa Quliyev	New Azerbaijan Party	9,236
40. Kəpəz İki̇nci̇ (gəncə)	Natiq Salahov	Independent	2,814
40. Kəpəz İki̇nci̇ (gəncə)	Eldar Zeynalov	Independent	2,089
41. Sumqayit Bi̇ri̇nci̇	Həcər Abbasli	Party of Hope	1,342
41. Sumqayit Bi̇ri̇nci̇	Əliəddin Abdullayev	Classic Popular Front Party	1,023
41. Sumqayit Bi̇ri̇nci̇	Dünyamin Əhmədli	Azerbaijan National Independence Party	911
41. Sumqayit Bi̇ri̇nci̇	Elman Muxtarov	Independent	2,087
41. Sumqayit Bi̇ri̇nci̇	Oqtay Tahirov	Musavat	1,062
41. Sumqayit Bi̇ri̇nci̇	Mirzəcan Xəlilov	New Azerbaijan Party	14,577
41. Sumqayit Bi̇ri̇nci̇	İslam Yusifzadə	Social Democratic Party	1,031
42. Sumqayit İki̇nci̇	Hafiz Babali	Independent	1,608
42. Sumqayit İki̇nci̇	Tahir Mirkişili	New Azerbaijan Party	14,399
42. Sumqayit İki̇nci̇	Təranə Mirzəyeva	Independent	1,379
42. Sumqayit İki̇nci̇	Ədalət Qafarov	Independent	1,365
42. Sumqayit İki̇nci̇	Nərmin Şamilova	Party for Democratic Reforms	1,357
42. Sumqayit İki̇nci̇	Kəmalə Səfərli	Independent	936
43. Sumqayit Üçüncü	Muxtar Babayev	New Azerbaijan Party	14,379
43. Sumqayit Üçüncü	Anar Əsədov	Independent	597
43. Sumqayit Üçüncü	Elçin Hüseynov	Independent	627
43. Sumqayit Üçüncü	Elçin Mahmud	Independent	825
43. Sumqayit Üçüncü	Eyvaz Qocayev	Independent	1,494
43. Sumqayit Üçüncü	Fikrət Rəşidov	Azerbaijan Communist Party	629
43. Sumqayit Üçüncü	Kəramət Salayev	Independent	1,893
44. Sumqayit-Xizi	Rəyasət Bağirov	Classic Popular Front Party	855
44. Sumqayit-Xizi	Nurlan Əsgərov	New Azerbaijan Party	4,732
44. Sumqayit-Xizi	Niyaməddin Orduxanov	Whole Azerbaijan Popular Front Party	534
44. Sumqayit-Xizi	Füzuli Qurbanov	Independent	548
44. Sumqayit-Xizi	Haci Salayev	Independent	15,713
44. Sumqayit-Xizi	Ramil Süleymanov	Independent	331
44. Sumqayit-Xizi	Niyazi Talibli	Independent	261
45. Abşeron	Cəmil Dadaşov	Independent	1,227
45. Abşeron	Ogtay Asadov	New Azerbaijan Party	22,748
45. Abşeron	Firud Fərəcov	Great Order Party	770
45. Abşeron	Təbriz Musayev	Azerbaijan National Independence Party	849
45. Abşeron	Valeh Rəfiyev	Independent	768
45. Abşeron	Zaman Zamanov	Democratic Azerbaijan World Party	662
46. Şi̇rvan	Xanbəgim Bağirli	Independent	372
46. Şi̇rvan	Əli Bəşirli	Classic Popular Front Party	1,621
46. Şi̇rvan	Rafael Cəbrayilov	Independent	14,703
46. Şi̇rvan	Elman Fəttah	Musavat	184
46. Şi̇rvan	Zülfiyyə Həzrətquliyeva	Motherland Party	1,338
46. Şi̇rvan	Paşa Nəbiyev	New Azerbaijan Party	5,316
47. Mi̇ngəçevi̇r	Emil Hacizadə	Independent	1,209
47. Mi̇ngəçevi̇r	Elçin Hüseynov	Azerbaijan Social Prosperity Party	845
47. Mi̇ngəçevi̇r	Könül Məmmədova	Independent	889
47. Mi̇ngəçevi̇r	Aydin Mirzazade	New Azerbaijan Party	7,820
47. Mi̇ngəçevi̇r	Cəmilə Musayeva	Independent	1,777
47. Mi̇ngəçevi̇r	Fəqani Orucov	Party for Democratic Reforms	597
47. Mi̇ngəçevi̇r	Kəmalə Tahirova	Independent	1,425
48. Yevlax	Yusif Əliyev	Independent	341
48. Yevlax	Vahid Hüseynov	Azerbaijan Social Prosperity Party	1,606
48. Yevlax	Zülfiyyə Mahmudova	Independent	2,179
48. Yevlax	İlham Məmmədov	New Azerbaijan Party	12,818
48. Yevlax	Anar Yusifli	Independent	1,850
49. Yevlax-Mi̇ngəçevi̇r	Yaşar Cəfərov	Independent	2,153
49. Yevlax-Mi̇ngəçevi̇r	Əli Hüseynli	New Azerbaijan Party	14,559
49. Yevlax-Mi̇ngəçevi̇r	Tural Kərimov	Azerbaijan Social Prosperity Party	1,577
49. Yevlax-Mi̇ngəçevi̇r	Nurəddin Rüstəmov	Musavat	237
49. Yevlax-Mi̇ngəçevi̇r	Eldəniz Tağiyev	Independent	1,997
50. Abşeron-Qobustan	İlqar Məmmədov	National Revival Movement Party	339
50. Abşeron-Qobustan	Büllur Məmmədova	Independent	540
50. Abşeron-Qobustan	Natiq Musayev	Independent	581
50. Abşeron-Qobustan	Ənvər Qayibov	Independent	1,714
50. Abşeron-Qobustan	Akif Rəhimov	New Azerbaijan Party	3,803
50. Abşeron-Qobustan	Səxavət Soltanli	Musavat	661
50. Abşeron-Qobustan	Zeynəb Xanlarova	Independent	17,887
51. Qusar	Azər Badamov	New Azerbaijan Party	16,579
51. Qusar	Kainat Əlimova	Party for Democratic Reforms	1,192
51. Qusar	Jalə Əmirbəyova	Independent	5,006
51. Qusar	Əskər İbrahimov	Justice Party	922
51. Qusar	Fəzahim Piriyev	Independent	588
51. Qusar	Sədaqət Səfərova	Independent	2,297
52. Quba	Hacibaba Bayramov	Civic Solidarity Party	285
52. Quba	Vahid Ahmadov	Independent	13,268
52. Quba	Afət Həsənova	New Azerbaijan Party	10,968
52. Quba	Zahir İsayev	Independent	121
52. Quba	Əlabbas Məhərrəmov	Independent	594
52. Quba	Bahar Məmmədova	Independent	51
52. Quba	Aynur Mövlanova	Independent	131
53. Quba-Qusar	Yevda Abramov	New Azerbaijan Party	16,840
53. Quba-Qusar	Həsənbala Məmmədov	Civic Solidarity Party	715
53. Quba-Qusar	Mehriban Quluyeva	New Azerbaijan Party	1,915
53. Quba-Qusar	Tərlan Şəfiyev	Independent	4,057
53. Quba-Qusar	Bahadir Vəkilov	Independent	2,530
53. Quba-Qusar	Sənan Xəlilov	Independent	1,035
54. Şabran-Si̇yəzən	Həbibulla Cavadov	Classic Popular Front Party	745
54. Şabran-Si̇yəzən	Nazim Muradəlizadə	Motherland Party	781
54. Şabran-Si̇yəzən	Osman Osmanov	Independent	684
54. Şabran-Si̇yəzən	Ruslan Qasimov	Independent	755
54. Şabran-Si̇yəzən	Elza Qasimova	Independent	4,410
54. Şabran-Si̇yəzən	Alim Rəsulov	Independent	735
54. Şabran-Si̇yəzən	Tahir Süleymanov	New Azerbaijan Party	19,232
55. Xaçmaz Şəhər	Lalə Abbasova	Independent	2,374
55. Xaçmaz Şəhər	İbrahimcan Burxanov	Independent	766
55. Xaçmaz Şəhər	Zümrüd Daşdəmirova	Independent	1,041
55. Xaçmaz Şəhər	Flora Ələsgərova	Independent	1,727
55. Xaçmaz Şəhər	Söhrab Əmrahov	Musavat	1,468
55. Xaçmaz Şəhər	Məmməd Qurbanov	Azerbaijan National Independence Party	915
55. Xaçmaz Şəhər	Eldəniz Səlimov	New Azerbaijan Party	16,388
56. Xaçmaz Kənd	Ehtiram Çeləbiyev	Independent	1,284
56. Xaçmaz Kənd	İlham Əliyev	New Azerbaijan Party	18,337
56. Xaçmaz Kənd	Zakir Kərəmov	Whole Azerbaijan Popular Front Party	860
56. Xaçmaz Kənd	Xaləddin Məlikov	Independent	2,977
56. Xaçmaz Kənd	Kəmran Musayev	Independent	1,568
56. Xaçmaz Kənd	Azay Vəlixanov	Independent	1,645
57. Kürdəmi̇r	Durhəsən Abdulov	Independent	752
57. Kürdəmi̇r	Vilayət Abuşov	Musavat	412
57. Kürdəmi̇r	Vəzir Kərimov	Whole Azerbaijan Popular Front Party	747
57. Kürdəmi̇r	Əlyusif Məlikov	Classic Popular Front Party	466
57. Kürdəmi̇r	Müslüm Məmmədov	Independent	14,387
57. Kürdəmi̇r	Xalidə Məmmədova	Independent	1,315
57. Kürdəmi̇r	Nizami Qəribov	New Azerbaijan Party	4,968
58. Haciqabul-Kürdəmi̇r	Nemət Babaşov	Independent	1,183
58. Haciqabul-Kürdəmi̇r	Könül Cabbarova	Independent	795
58. Haciqabul-Kürdəmi̇r	Rüfət Cəfərli	Independent	1,592
58. Haciqabul-Kürdəmi̇r	Elnur Əmirəslanov	New Azerbaijan Party	5,392
58. Haciqabul-Kürdəmi̇r	Rafael Hüseynov	Civic Solidarity Party	15,587
58. Haciqabul-Kürdəmi̇r	İmaməddin İsrafilov	Azerbaijan People's Party	314
58. Haciqabul-Kürdəmi̇r	İlham Mayilov	Independent	1,140
59. Salyan	İlqar Ağabəyov	New Azerbaijan Party	3,866
59. Salyan	Valeh Əliyev	Musavat	508
59. Salyan	Əliağa Hüseynov	Independent	17,691
59. Salyan	Ramal Hüseynov	Civic Solidarity Party	387
59. Salyan	Rüfət Muradli	Party of Hope	822
59. Salyan	Fiqurət Qafarov	Independent	484
59. Salyan	Nurali Quliyev	Independent	411
60. Salyan-Neftçala	Fəzail Ağamali	Motherland Party	16,584
60. Salyan-Neftçala	İsmayil Ağayev	Independent	1,700
60. Salyan-Neftçala	Mirzağa Axund	Musavat	1,223
60. Salyan-Neftçala	Rüstəm Məlikov	Independent	1,605
60. Salyan-Neftçala	Rza Səfərov	National Revival Movement Party	770
60. Salyan-Neftçala	Səlimağa Səlimli	Independent	1,548
60. Salyan-Neftçala	Əfzələddin Zakirov	Independent	535
61. Neftçala	Ramiz Dadaşov	Great Order Party	1,294
61. Neftçala	Araz Əhmədov	Independent	1,128
61. Neftçala	Cavad Əliyev	Independent	484
61. Neftçala	Cəlal Əliyev	Independent	930
61. Neftçala	Saday Fərəcov	Musavat	272
61. Neftçala	Əlihüseyn Haciyev	Independent	2,175
61. Neftçala	Arif Rəhimzadə	New Azerbaijan Party	17,159
62. Saatli	Əflatun Amaşov	Independent	15,276
62. Saatli	Malik Cavadov	Motherland Party	2,032
62. Saatli	Minayə Əliyeva	New Azerbaijan Party	893
62. Saatli	Vüqar Məmmədov	Independent	1,116
62. Saatli	Nazim Rəşidov	New Azerbaijan Party	3,188
62. Saatli	Elxan Zeynalov	Independent	1,182
63. Sabi̇rabad Bi̇ri̇nci̇	Səid Ağayev	Whole Azerbaijan Popular Front Party	228
63. Sabi̇rabad Bi̇ri̇nci̇	Pənah Hüseyn	Azerbaijan People's Party	3,903
63. Sabi̇rabad Bi̇ri̇nci̇	Kamran Mirzəyev	Independent	219
63. Sabi̇rabad Bi̇ri̇nci̇	Bəxtiyar Mövlüdov	Independent	139
63. Sabi̇rabad Bi̇ri̇nci̇	Elçin Quliyev	New Azerbaijan Party	14,039
63. Sabi̇rabad Bi̇ri̇nci̇	Araz Usubov	Azerbaijan Social Prosperity Party	188
64. Sabi̇rabad İki̇nci̇	Arzu Əliyev	Independent	1,948
64. Sabi̇rabad İki̇nci̇	Adil İbrahimov	Independent	2,199
64. Sabi̇rabad İki̇nci̇	Mehran Qəfərov	Independent	1,868
64. Sabi̇rabad İki̇nci̇	Adil Şabanli	Independent	2,538
64. Sabi̇rabad İki̇nci̇	Rüstəm Xəlilov	New Azerbaijan Party	15,380
65. Saatli-Sabi̇rabad-Kürdəmi̇r	Əhliman Əmiraslanov	New Azerbaijan Party	18,069
65. Saatli-Sabi̇rabad-Kürdəmi̇r	Yavər Əmrahov	Independent	1,656
65. Saatli-Sabi̇rabad-Kürdəmi̇r	Rahib İsmayilov	Motherland Party	877
65. Saatli-Sabi̇rabad-Kürdəmi̇r	Məzahir İsrayilov	Azerbaijan People's Party	1,935
65. Saatli-Sabi̇rabad-Kürdəmi̇r	Əlsafa Mahmudov	Independent	1,374
65. Saatli-Sabi̇rabad-Kürdəmi̇r	Haqverdi Tapdiqov	Independent	1,404
66. Bi̇ləsuvar	Ataxan Əliyev	Party for Democratic Reforms	1,226
66. Bi̇ləsuvar	Xanhüseyn Kazımlı	Azerbaijan Social Prosperity Party	16,083
66. Bi̇ləsuvar	Nailə Mehdiyeva	Independent	2,625
66. Bi̇ləsuvar	Rauf Nuri	Independent	2,060
66. Bi̇ləsuvar	Cavad Səlimov	Great Order Party	1,213
66. Bi̇ləsuvar	Orxan Xammədov	Independent	2,116
67. Cəli̇labad Şəhər	Güllər Bəhrəmova	Independent	674
67. Cəli̇labad Şəhər	Akif Əhmədov	Independent	1,375
67. Cəli̇labad Şəhər	Cavid Əsgərov	Independent	2,586
67. Cəli̇labad Şəhər	Malik Həsənov	New Azerbaijan Party	15,308
67. Cəli̇labad Şəhər	Fəxri Mirzəxanov	Independent	2,137
68. Cəli̇labad Kənd	Fərəc Bayramov	Citizen and Development Party	1,002
68. Cəli̇labad Kənd	Şahin Camalov	Independent	1,035
68. Cəli̇labad Kənd	Heydər Çobanzadə	Whole Azerbaijan Popular Front Party	1,282
68. Cəli̇labad Kənd	Mirkazim Kazimov	New Azerbaijan Party	3,563
68. Cəli̇labad Kənd	Natiq Kazimov	Independent	14,683
68. Cəli̇labad Kənd	Davud Qurbanov	Musavat	650
69. Cəli̇labad-Masalli-Bi̇ləsuvar	Elçin Axundzadə	Independent	328
69. Cəli̇labad-Masalli-Bi̇ləsuvar	Bəybala Əliyev	Party of Hope	1,503
69. Cəli̇labad-Masalli-Bi̇ləsuvar	Ağahüseyn Gözəlov	Independent	635
69. Cəli̇labad-Masalli-Bi̇ləsuvar	Murad Hüseynov	Independent	1,215
69. Cəli̇labad-Masalli-Bi̇ləsuvar	Fəzail İbrahimli	Civic Solidarity Party	13,302
69. Cəli̇labad-Masalli-Bi̇ləsuvar	Daşqin Nuriyev	Azerbaijan Democratic Party	565
69. Cəli̇labad-Masalli-Bi̇ləsuvar	Etibar Sadiğov	New Azerbaijan Party	2,570
69. Cəli̇labad-Masalli-Bi̇ləsuvar	Mətanət Şahaliyeva	Independent	1,031
70. Masalli Şəhər	Nəriman Əliyev	New Azerbaijan Party	13,656
70. Masalli Şəhər	Vahid Əliyev	Independent	2,866
70. Masalli Şəhər	Fəraməz Gözəlov	Independent	1,789
70. Masalli Şəhər	Ruslan İbrahimov	Independent	1,558
70. Masalli Şəhər	Şahmar Kazimov	Independent	1,771
71. Masalli Kənd	Elmira Axundova	Independent	10,921
71. Masalli Kənd	Cümşüd Əhədov	Independent	476
71. Masalli Kənd	Xasay Fərzulla	Musavat	614
71. Masalli Kənd	Aliq Məmmədov	Independent	451
71. Masalli Kənd	Raqif Novruzov	New Azerbaijan Party	4,504
71. Masalli Kənd	Qubadəli Rzayev	Independent	1,093
72. Yardimli-Masalli	Coşqun Becanov	Independent	722
72. Yardimli-Masalli	Əfqan Binyatov	Independent	1,029
72. Yardimli-Masalli	Sərvər Əliyev	New Azerbaijan Party	5,762
72. Yardimli-Masalli	Şahmar Əmirov	Independent	482
72. Yardimli-Masalli	Musa Qasimli	Independent	13,025
72. Yardimli-Masalli	Qadir Rüstəmli	Independent	854
73. Lənkəran Şəhər	Mənsur Ağayev	New Azerbaijan Party	2,172
73. Lənkəran Şəhər	Hüseyn Cavadzadə	Independent	1,575
73. Lənkəran Şəhər	Sərxan Əbilov	Independent	254
73. Lənkəran Şəhər	Gülarə Həmidova	Independent	1,416
73. Lənkəran Şəhər	Samin Həsənov	Independent	947
73. Lənkəran Şəhər	Rufet Quliyev	Independent	11,823
74. Lənkəran Kənd	Ağadadaş Əliyev	Independent	3,666
74. Lənkəran Kənd	Mübariz Həbibov	Independent	844
74. Lənkəran Kənd	Diləfruz Məhərrəmova	Independent	774
74. Lənkəran Kənd	Hadi Rəcəbli	New Azerbaijan Party	14,044
74. Lənkəran Kənd	Seyfulla Şükürov	Independent	932
75. Lənkəran-Masalli	Nicat Ağayev	Independent	248
75. Lənkəran-Masalli	Vüsalə Həşimova	Independent	300
75. Lənkəran-Masalli	İsa İbadov	Independent	1,649
75. Lənkəran-Masalli	Cavanşir Paşazadə	New Azerbaijan Party	16,046
75. Lənkəran-Masalli	Səyavuş Süleymanli	Independent	4,294
76. Lənkəran-Astara	Şükür Cəfərov	Independent	671
76. Lənkəran-Astara	Ziyafat Asgarov	New Azerbaijan Party	16,085
76. Lənkəran-Astara	Ramin Hüseynov	Independent	1,921
76. Lənkəran-Astara	Asif İskəndərov	Independent	1,672
76. Lənkəran-Astara	Şakir Qasimov	Independent	1,918
77. Astara	Novruz Hacizadə	Independent	1,760
77. Astara	Gülzar İsmayilova	New Azerbaijan Party	440
77. Astara	Rəşad Mahmudov	New Azerbaijan Party	14,246
77. Astara	Gülnar Muxtarova	Independent	1,998
77. Astara	Adil Rzayev	Independent	1,986
77. Astara	Mikayil Talibov	Independent	796
78. Leri̇k	Nizami Kazimov	Independent	1,242
78. Leri̇k	İqbal Məmmədov	New Azerbaijan Party	11,870
78. Leri̇k	Raqib Məmmədov	Azerbaijan Social Prosperity Party	1,704
78. Leri̇k	Şahlar Məmmədov	New Azerbaijan Party	608
78. Leri̇k	Mehdibəy Səfərov	Independent	1,139
78. Leri̇k	Təyyar Yəhyayev	Independent	897
79. İmi̇şli̇	İltizam Əkbərli	Musavat	2,898
79. İmi̇şli̇	Mirismayil Hadi	Independent	1,089
79. İmi̇şli̇	Tapdiq Həsənov	Azerbaijan National Independence Party	860
79. İmi̇şli̇	Əsabil Qasimov	New Azerbaijan Party	11,263
79. İmi̇şli̇	Rüstəm Qüdrətov	Azerbaijan Communist Party	144
79. İmi̇şli̇	İxtiyar Rüstəmov	Independent	1,094
79. İmi̇şli̇	Tariel Şirinli	Independent	83
79. İmi̇şli̇	Habil Şirinov	Independent	551
79. İmi̇şli̇	İsmayil Yusifov	Independent	53
80. İmi̇şli̇-Beyləqan	Mirzağa Əlizadə	Independent	1,084
80. İmi̇şli̇-Beyləqan	Ramiz Əmirov	New Azerbaijan Party	7,157
80. İmi̇şli̇-Beyləqan	Çingiz Qənizadə	Independent	15,155
80. İmi̇şli̇-Beyləqan	Validə Tağiyeva	Independent	390
80. İmi̇şli̇-Beyləqan	Vüqar Xankişiyev	National Revival Movement Party	138
80. İmi̇şli̇-Beyləqan	Vazeh Zahidov	Party for Democratic Reforms	250
81. Beyləqan	Tapdiq Abbas	Independent	1,178
81. Beyləqan	Ramilə Dadaşova	Independent	4,299
81. Beyləqan	Vaqif Əsədov	Independent	3,637
81. Beyləqan	Anar İsayev	Party of Hope	522
81. Beyləqan	Şahin İsmayilov	New Azerbaijan Party	14,456
81. Beyləqan	Füzuli Quliyev	National Revival Movement Party	155
82. Ağcabədi̇	Rövşən Bayramov	Independent	1,877
82. Ağcabədi̇	Feyzulla Feyzullayev	Independent	2,108
82. Ağcabədi̇	Rauf Həsənov	Independent	1,746
82. Ağcabədi̇	Anar İsmayilov	Motherland Party	952
82. Ağcabədi̇	Baxşeyiş Məmmədov	Independent	1,311
82. Ağcabədi̇	Əhməd Məmmədov	Great Order Party	820
82. Ağcabədi̇	Tariyel Mirzəyev	Party for Democratic Reforms	595
82. Ağcabədi̇	Tahir Rzayev	New Azerbaijan Party	16,222
83. Ağcabədi̇-Füzuli̇	Aqil Abbasov	Independent	16,103
83. Ağcabədi̇-Füzuli̇	Sadiq Əliyev	New Azerbaijan Party	4,365
83. Ağcabədi̇-Füzuli̇	Şərafət Haciyeva	Independent	861
83. Ağcabədi̇-Füzuli̇	Müşviq Həsənov	Independent	1,775
83. Ağcabədi̇-Füzuli̇	Xaliq Hüseynov	Independent	786
83. Ağcabədi̇-Füzuli̇	Hüseyn Malişov	Great Order Party	797
84. Füzuli̇	Rəqiyyə Hüseynova	Independent	1,765
84. Füzuli̇	Fazil Məhərrəmov	Independent	1,975
84. Füzuli̇	Bahar Muradova	New Azerbaijan Party	21,548
84. Füzuli̇	Sevinc Nəsirova	Independent	2,633
84. Füzuli̇	Taleh Qurbanov	Independent	2,005
85. Şamaxi	Əmrali Dəmirov	New Azerbaijan Party	271
85. Şamaxi	Eyvaz Eminaliyev	New Azerbaijan Party	4,667
85. Şamaxi	Vəfali Fətullayev	Independent	597
85. Şamaxi	Elizə İsmayilova	Independent	790
85. Şamaxi	Şəhriyar Qəhrəman	Independent	589
85. Şamaxi	Akif Soltanov	Unity Party	478
85. Şamaxi	Elxan Süleymanov	Independent	15,306
85. Şamaxi	Ləman Süleymanova	New Azerbaijan Party	543
86. İsmayilli	Novruzəli Aslanov	Independent	16,423
86. İsmayilli	Nadir Canaliyev	Motherland Party	586
86. İsmayilli	Rayiz Nuriyev	Whole Azerbaijan Popular Front Party	698
86. İsmayilli	Xuraman Qurbanova	New Azerbaijan Party	3,329
86. İsmayilli	Məzahir Şahvələdov	Independent	1,516
87. Ağsu-İsmayilli	Yaqub Babali	Classic Popular Front Party	518
87. Ağsu-İsmayilli	Emin Babayev	Independent	589
87. Ağsu-İsmayilli	Elçin Əfəndiyev	New Azerbaijan Party	390
87. Ağsu-İsmayilli	Ağasən Hüseynov	Independent	460
87. Ağsu-İsmayilli	Amil Hüseynov	Independent	403
87. Ağsu-İsmayilli	Tahir Kərimli	Unity Party	14,592
87. Ağsu-İsmayilli	Əlyunis Mütəllimov	New Azerbaijan Party	4,566
87. Ağsu-İsmayilli	Zəka Şikarli	Independent	496
88. Göyçay	Sakin Abdullabəyli	Citizen and Development Party	561
88. Göyçay	Elsevər Allahyarov	Party for Democratic Reforms	1,078
88. Göyçay	Sabir Haciyev	Civic Unity Party	13,548
88. Göyçay	Ləman Haciyeva	New Azerbaijan Party	4,167
88. Göyçay	Samirə Mustafayeva	Independent	2,207
88. Göyçay	Şaiq Ömərov	Independent	1,939
89. Göyçay-Ağdaş	Vaqif Babayev	Independent	873
89. Göyçay-Ağdaş	İlqar Əzimov	National Revival Movement Party	450
89. Göyçay-Ağdaş	Namiq Hacili	Musavat	898
89. Göyçay-Ağdaş	Abdulla Həşimov	Independent	1,304
89. Göyçay-Ağdaş	Vidadi İsgəndərov	Independent	1,323
89. Göyçay-Ağdaş	Şahid Kərimov	Independent	1,756
89. Göyçay-Ağdaş	Elman Nəsirov	New Azerbaijan Party	13,125
89. Göyçay-Ağdaş	Rövşən Şərifov	Independent	1,613
90. Ağdaş	Invalidated results		
91. Ucar	Ədalət Ağamaliyev	Independent	1,666
91. Ucar	Vüsal Hüseynov	New Azerbaijan Party	14,797
91. Ucar	Elvin İbrahimov	Independent	3,377
91. Ucar	Kazim Mikayilov	Independent	1,452
91. Ucar	Nadir Nuriyev	Independent	2,497
92. Zərdab-Ucar	Kamil Ağayev	Independent	2,159
92. Zərdab-Ucar	Jalə Əliyeva	Independent	10,854
92. Zərdab-Ucar	Elbəy Əsədov	Independent	359
92. Zərdab-Ucar	Günel İbadova	Party of Hope	597
92. Zərdab-Ucar	Gülağa İsgəndərov	New Azerbaijan Party	6,592
92. Zərdab-Ucar	Rasim Kərimov	Whole Azerbaijan Popular Front Party	440
92. Zərdab-Ucar	Yaqub Səfərəliyev	New Azerbaijan Party	197
93. Bərdə Şəhər	Ərəstun Baxşəliyev	Independent	1,512
93. Bərdə Şəhər	Govhar Bakhshaliyeva	Independent	18,208
93. Bərdə Şəhər	Pərviz Əlizadə	Independent	949
93. Bərdə Şəhər	Elçin Əzimov	Whole Azerbaijan Popular Front Party	1,730
93. Bərdə Şəhər	Tanriverdi Haciyev	Motherland Party	1,656
93. Bərdə Şəhər	Xuraman Həsənova	Independent	1,253
94. Bərdə Kənd	Yasin Abbasov	Independent	1,000
94. Bərdə Kənd	Gülüsüm Babayeva	Independent	851
94. Bərdə Kənd	Rauf Əliyev	Independent	948
94. Bərdə Kənd	Abiş Haciyev	Whole Azerbaijan Popular Front Party	1,077
94. Bərdə Kənd	Zahid Oruc	Independent	18,456
94. Bərdə Kənd	Sadiq Xəlilov	New Azerbaijan Party	3,376
95. Tərtər	Sahib Aliyev	Independent	14,718
95. Tərtər	Şəhriyar Məcidzadə	Independent	1,613
95. Tərtər	Zöhrə Məmmədova	Independent	497
95. Tərtər	Surxay Mirzəyev	New Azerbaijan Party	4,640
95. Tərtər	Könül Quliyeva	Great Order Party	365
95. Tərtər	Mircavad Seyidov	Independent	631
96. Goranboy-Naftalan	Mahir Aslanov	Independent	15,944
96. Goranboy-Naftalan	Rəfail Əliyev	Independent	1,292
96. Goranboy-Naftalan	Xaləddin Həsənov	New Azerbaijan Party	3,674
96. Goranboy-Naftalan	Əli Həzquluyev	Whole Azerbaijan Popular Front Party	421
96. Goranboy-Naftalan	Ramin Qasimov	Independent	1,727
96. Goranboy-Naftalan	Namaz Yusif	Musavat	357
97. Goranboy-Ağdam-Tərtər	Ədalət Əliyev	Independent	1,435
97. Goranboy-Ağdam-Tərtər	Tahir Əliyev	Independent	2,173
97. Goranboy-Ağdam-Tərtər	İlham Mahmudov	Independent	2,082
97. Goranboy-Ağdam-Tərtər	Yaqub Məmmədov	Civic Solidarity Party	1,343
97. Goranboy-Ağdam-Tərtər	Ağalar Vəliyev	New Azerbaijan Party	15,429
98. Şəmki̇r Şəhər	Ramil Cabbarov	Independent	1,037
98. Şəmki̇r Şəhər	Fərhad Cəfərov	Independent	985
98. Şəmki̇r Şəhər	Səadət Hüseynova	Independent	759
98. Şəmki̇r Şəhər	Vüsal Mirzəyev	Independent	572
98. Şəmki̇r Şəhər	Vüqar Mövsümov	Independent	687
98. Şəmki̇r Şəhər	Sahibə Qafarova	New Azerbaijan Party	15,720
98. Şəmki̇r Şəhər	Anar Zamanov	Independent	499
99. Şəmki̇r Kənd	Vahid Cəfərov	Party of Hope	639
99. Şəmki̇r Kənd	Sona Əliyeva	New Azerbaijan Party	17,162
99. Şəmki̇r Kənd	Vəfa Məmmədova	Independent	1,618
99. Şəmki̇r Kənd	Zenfira Məmmədova	Independent	1,830
99. Şəmki̇r Kənd	Elbariz Tağiyev	Independent	898
99. Şəmki̇r Kənd	Tariyel Vəliyev	Independent	1,421
100. Şəmki̇r-Daşkəsən	Kamran Bayramov	New Azerbaijan Party	16,260
100. Şəmki̇r-Daşkəsən	Sahib Əliyev	Independent	2,201
100. Şəmki̇r-Daşkəsən	Orxan Əsədov	Independent	478
100. Şəmki̇r-Daşkəsən	Ruslan Kirov	Independent	1,290
100. Şəmki̇r-Daşkəsən	Şahbaz Mehdiyev	Independent	586
100. Şəmki̇r-Daşkəsən	Rauf Qurbanov	Azerbaijan Communist Party	1,708
101. Göygöl-Daşkəsən	Səyavuş Ağayev	Independent	1,118
101. Göygöl-Daşkəsən	Amil Hüseynov	Independent	944
101. Göygöl-Daşkəsən	İlham Məmmədov	New Azerbaijan Party	4,538
101. Göygöl-Daşkəsən	Rövşən Rzayev	Independent	18,270
101. Göygöl-Daşkəsən	Faiq Yusibov	Independent	478
102. Samux-Şəmki̇r	Etibar Əkbərov	Independent	516
102. Samux-Şəmki̇r	Valeh Ələsgərov	Independent	17,652
102. Samux-Şəmki̇r	Rahil Həsənov	New Azerbaijan Party	4,965
102. Samux-Şəmki̇r	Ülviyə İmanova	Independent	789
102. Samux-Şəmki̇r	Elnur Salamov	Independent	1,160
103. Gədəbəy	Vüsalə Abbasova	Independent	1,141
103. Gədəbəy	Elvin Cahangirov	Independent	1,666
103. Gədəbəy	Vüsal Əmiraslanov	Independent	1,325
103. Gədəbəy	Sevinc Hüseynova	New Azerbaijan Party	16,985
103. Gədəbəy	Ruşan Ruşanzadə	Independent	806
103. Gədəbəy	Albina Rzayeva	Independent	1,376
104. Gədəbəy-Tovuz	Səbinə Abdullayeva	Azerbaijan Communist Party	1,015
104. Gədəbəy-Tovuz	Nazim Hüseynli	Independent	2,233
104. Gədəbəy-Tovuz	Rahib İbrahimov	Independent	1,738
104. Gədəbəy-Tovuz	Faiq Mahmudov	Independent	1,360
104. Gədəbəy-Tovuz	Rafiq Məmmədhəsənov	New Azerbaijan Party	17,378
104. Gədəbəy-Tovuz	Nazim Məmmədov	Independent	1,900
105. Tovuz	Cavid Cəfərov	Independent	330
105. Tovuz	Mehman Əliyev	Civic Solidarity Party	367
105. Tovuz	Cəmilə Məmmədova	Independent	359
105. Tovuz	Ganira Pashayeva	Independent	16,237
105. Tovuz	Nəriman Şirinov	Independent	905
105. Tovuz	Rahilə Yusifova	New Azerbaijan Party	7,759
106. Tovuz-Qazax-Ağstafa	Ülviyyə Ağayeva	Independent	16,086
106. Tovuz-Qazax-Ağstafa	Ülvi Bayramov	Motherland Party	162
106. Tovuz-Qazax-Ağstafa	İlyas İsmaylov	Justice Party	2,132
106. Tovuz-Qazax-Ağstafa	Ramin Qarayev	Independent	558
106. Tovuz-Qazax-Ağstafa	Rüfət Qasimov	Independent	355
106. Tovuz-Qazax-Ağstafa	Canpolad Qəhrəmanov	New Azerbaijan Party	6,999
107. Qazax	Zeynal Əhmədov	New Azerbaijan Party	4,838
107. Qazax	Venera Əsgərova	Independent	776
107. Qazax	Zaur Haciyev	Independent	1,676
107. Qazax	Kavi Məmmədov	Independent	887
107. Qazax	Sərdar Məmmədov	Independent	633
107. Qazax	Kamran Nəbizadə	Independent	14,881
108. Ağstafa	Rəşad Arabov	Independent	1,171
108. Ağstafa	Nizami Cəfərov	New Azerbaijan Party	18,485
108. Ağstafa	Fəxrəddin Dolq	Independent	2,089
108. Ağstafa	Eldar Haciyev	Independent	1,887
108. Ağstafa	Vüqar Kərimov	Independent	1,915
109. Balakən	Mustafa Dibirov	Independent	426
109. Balakən	Nurlan Əhmədov	Independent	2,757
109. Balakən	Nəsib Məhəməliyev	New Azerbaijan Party	16,972
109. Balakən	Asim Piriyev	Independent	1,072
109. Balakən	Əliyar Şibliyev	Independent	1,332
109. Balakən	Sevinc Şirinova	Independent	1,181
109. Balakən	Məmməd Xanayev	Independent	676
110. Zaqatala	Bəhruz Bayramov	New Azerbaijan Party	3,288
110. Zaqatala	Musa Feyzullayev	Independent	2,403
110. Zaqatala	Dürdanə Hüseynova	Independent	2,529
110. Zaqatala	Rəşid Mitiləyev	Independent	1,771
110. Zaqatala	Elşən Musayev	Azerbaijan Democratic Enlightenment Party	13,279
110. Zaqatala	Samir Rəhimov	Independent	2,023
111. Zaqatala-Balakən	Kamilə Əliyeva	New Azerbaijan Party	12,825
111. Zaqatala-Balakən	İranə Əlizadə	Independent	2,246
111. Zaqatala-Balakən	Vüqar İsrafilov	Independent	1,957
111. Zaqatala-Balakən	Həsən Ömərov	Independent	3,702
111. Zaqatala-Balakən	Yaşar Qurbanov	Independent	1,817
111. Zaqatala-Balakən	Famil Rəhimov	Independent	2,842
112. Qax	Cəlil Cəlilov	Great Order Party	492
112. Qax	Nigar Əlicanli	Azerbaijan National Independence Party	575
112. Qax	Babək Heydərov	New Azerbaijan Party	1,434
112. Qax	Azər Kərimli	Independent	16,294
112. Qax	Məhəmməd Qadaşli	Civic Solidarity Party	674
112. Qax	Əhməd Şahidov	Independent	2,735
113. Şəki̇ Şəhər	Rəfail Abdullayev	Independent	1,843
113. Şəki̇ Şəhər	Qorxmaz İbrahimxəlilov	Independent	2,351
113. Şəki̇ Şəhər	Yaqub Mahmudov	New Azerbaijan Party	10,220
113. Şəki̇ Şəhər	Gülarə Nəbiyeva	Independent	1,595
113. Şəki̇ Şəhər	Yaşar Süleymanov	Independent	2,065
114. Şəki̇ Kənd Bi̇ri̇nci̇	Xanlar Ağabəyov	New Azerbaijan Party	4,259
114. Şəki̇ Kənd Bi̇ri̇nci̇	İbrahimxəlil Balayev	Independent	3,307
114. Şəki̇ Kənd Bi̇ri̇nci̇	Anar Məmmədov	Independent	555
114. Şəki̇ Kənd Bi̇ri̇nci̇	İsrafil Məmmədsoy	Independent	328
114. Şəki̇ Kənd Bi̇ri̇nci̇	Əli Məsimli	Independent	9,422
114. Şəki̇ Kənd Bi̇ri̇nci̇	Mürsəl Mustafayev	Independent	576
115. Şəki̇ Kənd İki̇nci̇	Qurban Abbasov	Independent	2,203
115. Şəki̇ Kənd İki̇nci̇	Cavanşir Feyziyev	Independent	11,584
115. Şəki̇ Kənd İki̇nci̇	İkram İsrafil	Musavat	1,923
115. Şəki̇ Kənd İki̇nci̇	Elçin Qarayev	New Azerbaijan Party	3,270
115. Şəki̇ Kənd İki̇nci̇	Sahib Xəlilov	Social Democratic Party	860
116. Qəbələ	Mehman Abbasov	Party for Democratic Reforms	852
116. Qəbələ	Fəttah Heydərov	Independent	19,700
116. Qəbələ	Eyvaz Kazimov	Independent	1,318
116. Qəbələ	Vəfa Mehraliyeva	Independent	1,020
116. Qəbələ	Məhəbbət Rüstəmova	Independent	1,563
117. Oğuz-Qəbələ	Aybəniz Babayeva	Independent	2,153
117. Oğuz-Qəbələ	Atamoğlan Məmmədov	Great Order Party	1,008
117. Oğuz-Qəbələ	Rəfayil Mirzəzadə	National Revival Movement Party	1,175
117. Oğuz-Qəbələ	Aqiyə Naxçivanli	New Azerbaijan Party	18,169
117. Oğuz-Qəbələ	Mehriban Nəsibova	Independent	1,412
117. Oğuz-Qəbələ	Rasim Qafarov	Independent	954
117. Oğuz-Qəbələ	Nərgiz Şixiyeva	Independent	786
118. Ağdam Şəhər	Gülnar Abbasova	New Azerbaijan Party	3,104
118. Ağdam Şəhər	Musa Ağayev	Independent	1,192
118. Ağdam Şəhər	Bəxtiyar Əliyev	Independent	13,644
118. Ağdam Şəhər	Rafayil Haciyev	Independent	450
118. Ağdam Şəhər	Məhəmməd Hüseynov	Independent	1,365
118. Ağdam Şəhər	Amil Quliyev	Azerbaijan Communist Party	787
119. Ağdam Kənd	Zabikə Aslanova	Independent	2,798
119. Ağdam Kənd	Xəqani Cəfərov	Independent	1,589
119. Ağdam Kənd	Şakur Məhərrəmov	Independent	2,633
119. Ağdam Kənd	Zülfiyyə Qurbanova	Independent	498
119. Ağdam Kənd	Bəxtiyar Sadiqov	New Azerbaijan Party	16,199
120. Cəbrayil-Qubadli	Əbülfəz Əhmədov	Independent	2,226
120. Cəbrayil-Qubadli	Razim Əmiraslanov	Musavat	2,088
120. Cəbrayil-Qubadli	Adəm Məmmədov	Independent	1,355
120. Cəbrayil-Qubadli	Anar Məmmədov	Independent	1,007
120. Cəbrayil-Qubadli	Sari Məmmədov	Independent	1,115
120. Cəbrayil-Qubadli	Elşən Nəcəfov	Independent	745
120. Cəbrayil-Qubadli	Astan Şahverdiyev	New Azerbaijan Party	14,723
121. Laçin	Mahir Abbaszadə	New Azerbaijan Party	16,028
121. Laçin	Dünarə Əbdürəhimova	Independent	1,925
121. Laçin	Elməddin Əkbərli	Independent	2,489
121. Laçin	Mayil İlyasov	Independent	3,871
121. Laçin	Tural Mamedov	Independent	1,350
122. Xankəndi̇	Vaqif Allahverdiyev	Independent	274
122. Xankəndi̇	Ceyhun Ələkbərov	Independent	816
122. Xankəndi̇	Elçin İsgəndərzadə	New Azerbaijan Party	156
122. Xankəndi̇	Flora Qasimova	Independent	1,337
122. Xankəndi̇	Şahin Qədirov	Independent	97
123. Kəlbəcər	Tofiq Əzizov	Independent	842
123. Kəlbəcər	İsgəndər Həmidov	Independent	2,189
123. Kəlbəcər	Nizami Həsənov	Party for Democratic Reforms	198
123. Kəlbəcər	Sirac Hüseynov	Independent	302
123. Kəlbəcər	Arif Məmmədov	Independent	357
123. Kəlbəcər	Cavid Qurbanov	New Azerbaijan Party	25,621
123. Kəlbəcər	Nağdəli Zamanov	Independent	596
124. Şuşa-Ağdam-Xocali-Xocavənd	Güləli Bağirov	Independent	785
124. Şuşa-Ağdam-Xocali-Xocavənd	Fuad Cəfərov	Independent	993
124. Şuşa-Ağdam-Xocali-Xocavənd	Ağalar Əliyev	Independent	2,522
124. Şuşa-Ağdam-Xocali-Xocavənd	Xalidə Əmraslanova	Independent	659
124. Şuşa-Ağdam-Xocali-Xocavənd	Elman Mammadov	New Azerbaijan Party	16,283
124. Şuşa-Ağdam-Xocali-Xocavənd	Elxan Süleymanli	Independent	3,730
125. Zəngi̇lan-Qubadli	Şair Abduləzizli	Independent	411
125. Zəngi̇lan-Qubadli	Tahir Əlirzayev	Independent	2,343
125. Zəngi̇lan-Qubadli	Ədalət Əsədov	Independent	849
125. Zəngi̇lan-Qubadli	Əlisahib Hüseynov	Democratic Azerbaijan World Party	2,568
125. Zəngi̇lan-Qubadli	İmamverdi İsmayilov	New Azerbaijan Party	17,181
125. Zəngi̇lan-Qubadli	Qara Məmmədov	Independent	3,053
125. Zəngi̇lan-Qubadli	Ramiz Nəcəfov	Great Order Party	363
Source: MSK
