= Seyidli =

Seyidli may refer to:

- Seyidli, Agdam, Azerbaijan
- Seyidli, Khachmaz, a village in Nabran municipality, Azerbaijan
