= Mammadov =

Mammadov (Azerbaijani: Məmmədov), feminine: Mammadova (Məmmədova), is a surname found in Azerbaijan. It is a patronymic surname derived from the given name Mammad using Russian patronymic suffix -ov. Notable people with the surname include:

- Aghasi Mammadov (born 1980), Azerbaijani boxer
- Alakbar Mammadov (1930–2014), Soviet and Azerbaijani footballer
- Aqil Mammadov (born 1989), Azerbaijani footballer, currently for FK Baku
- Arif Mammadov (ambassador) (born 1964) Azerbaijani former diplomat and opposition activist
- Arif Mammadov, Azerbaijani politician, Director of State Civil Aviation Administration of Azerbaijan Republic
- Aysel Mammadova (born 1989), Azerbaijani singer
- Azer Mammadov (born 1976), Azerbaijani footballer
- Diana Mammadova (born 1998), Azerbaijani footballer
- Eduard Mammadov (born 1978), Azerbaijani kickboxer
- Eldar Mammadov (born 1968), awarded "Hero of Azerbaijan" for his part in the Nagorno-Karabakh war
- Elkhan Mammadov (disambiguation), multiple people
- Elman Mammadov (born 1950), Azerbaijani politician, Member of National Assembly of Azerbaijan
- Elshan Mammadov (born 1980), Azerbaijani footballer
- Elvin Məmmədov (born 1988), Azerbaijani footballer
- Etibar Mammadov (born 1955), Azerbaijani politician, founder and leader of Azerbaijan National Independence Party
- Farid Mammadov (born 1991), Azerbaijani singer
- Farida Mammadova (1936–2021), Azerbaijani historian
- Fazil Mammadov, Azerbaijani politician, Minister of Taxes of Azerbaijan Republic
- Fikrat Mammadov Azerbaijani politician, currently Minister of Justice of Azerbaijan Republic
- Garib Mammadov (born 1947), Azerbaijani scholar and politician, Chairman of State Land and Cartography Committee
- Georgiy Mammadov (born 1947), Soviet and Russian diplomat
- Gulchohra Mammadova (born 1953), Azerbaijani architect and academician
- Gulnar Mammadova (born 1991), Azerbaijani chess player
- Gurban Mammadov (born 1959), Azerbaijani politician & owner of "AzerFreedom TV"
- Havva Mammadova (born 1958), Azerbaijani politician and historian
- Ilgar Mammadov (born 1970), Azerbaijani politician
- Ismayil Mammadov (born 1976), Azerbaijani footballer
- Israfil Mammadov (1919–1946), Soviet Azerbaijani officer
- Kamilla Mammadova (born 1996), Azerbaijani footballer
- Khagani Mammadov (born 1976), Azerbaijani footballer
- Magsud Mammadov (dancer) (1929–2026), Soviet and Azerbaijani ballet dancer and ballet master
- Magsud Mammadov (politician) (1897–1938), Azerbaijani statesman and politician
- Mammadrafi Mammadov, Azerbaijani politician, Minister of Defense of Azerbaijan from 1993 to 1995
- Natalya Mammadova (born 1984), Ukrainian-born Azerbaijani volleyball player
- Narmina Mammadova (born 1990), Azerbaijani footballer
- Narmin Mammadova (born 1999), Azerbaijani chess master
- Nazakat Mammadova (1944–1980), Azerbaijani singer
- Nodar Mammadov (born 1988), Azerbaijani footballer
- Novruz Mammadov (born 1947), Azerbaijani professor of French
- Novruzali Mammadov (1940–2009), Talysh national minority activist in Azerbaijan
- Parvin Mammadov (born 1995), Azerbaijani Paralympic powerlifter
- Ramiz Mammadov (born 1968), Azerbaijani footballer
- Rashad Mammadov (born 1974), Belarusian judoka
- Rauf Mammadov (born 1988), Azerbaijani chess player
- Samir Mammadov (born 1988), Azerbaijani boxer
- Shafiga Mammadova (born 1945), Azerbaijani actress
- Shovkat Mammadova (1897–1981), Azerbaijani opera singer
- Umileyla Mammadova (1916–2007), Azerbaijani cotton grower
- Valeriya Mammadova (born 1984), Azerbaijani volleyball player
- Yaqub Mammadov (born 1941), Acting President of Azerbaijan in 1992
- Yusif Mammadov (born 1950), mathematician
- Zakir Mammadov (born 1936), Correspondent member of Azerbaijan National Academy of Sciences
- Zivar Mammadova (1902–1980), Azerbaijani sculptor
- Ziya Mammadov (born 1952), Azerbaijani politician, Minister of Transportation

== See also ==
- Mamedov, Mammedov, Mämmedow
