= Rufat Quliyev =

Rufat Quliyev may refer to:

- Rufat Quliyev (footballer), Azerbaijani football player
- Rufet Quliyev, economist and politician
