= Yagub Mammadov =

Yagub Mammadov may refer to:

- Yagub Mammadov (politician), acting president of Azerbaijan from 6 March to 14 May and from 18 to 19 May 1992
- Yagub Mammadov (singer), Azerbaijani mugham singer.

== See also ==
- Mammadov
