= Mamedov =

Mamedov (feminine: Mamedova) (Azerbaijani: Məmmədov, Russian: Мамедов) is a surname of Azerbaijan or Uzbekistan origin.

The native Azerbaijani surname may also be transliterated as Mammadov/Mammadova, Mammedov.

Notable people with the surname include:

- Adalat Mamedov, Azerbaijani boxer
- Amaliya Mamedova (born 2008), Uzbekistani rhythmic gymnast
- Chary Mamedov, Turkmenistan discus thrower
- Edgar Mamedov (born 2010), Kazakhstani chess grandmaster
- Elshan Mamedov (born 1980), Azerbaijani footballer
- Enver Mamedov (1923–2023), Soviet broadcasting official
- Gabil Mamedov (born 1994), Russian boxer
- Fuad Mamedov (born 1946), Azerbaijani academic
- Georgiy Mamedov (born 1947), Soviet and Russian diplomat
- Gyunduz Mamedov (born 1974), Ukrainian jurist, Prosecutor of Odessa, Prosecutor of the Autonomous Republic of Crimea
- Maxim Mamedov (born 1987), Kazakhstani volleyball player
- Mergen Mamedov, a transliteration via Russian of the name Mergen Mämmedow, Turkmenistani hammer thrower
- Nidjat Mamedov (born 1985), Azerbaijani chess grandmaster
- Ramiz Mamedov (born 1972), Russian footballer
- Rauf Mamedov (born 1988), Azerbaijani chess Grandmaster
- Sakina Mamedova (born 1985), Uzbekistani sports shooter
- Seymour Mamedov, National Hero of Azerbaijan
- Shamil Mamedov (born 2001), Bulgarian freestyle wrestler
- Subhan Mamedov, Azerbaijani boxer
