= Alasgar Mammadov =

Azerbaijani orientalist and Arabist

- Ələsgər Cəfər oğlu Məmmədov
- Born: Ali Asgar Jafar oghlu Mammadov; 10 October 1919; Keshla, Baku, Baku uezd, Azerbaijan Democratic Republic
- Died: 29 January 2000 (aged 80); Baku, Azerbaijan
- Citizenship: Soviet Union
- Education: Azerbaijan State Pedagogical University; Moscow Institute of Oriental Studies
- Scientific career
- Fields: Oriental studies; Arabist
- Workplaces: Baku State University; Azerbaijan Higher Naval Academy; People's Commissariat for Foreign Affairs
- Doctoral students: Vasim Mammadaliyev; Aida Imanguliyeva; Govhar Bakhshaliyeva; Imamverdi Hamidov; Nariman Gasimoglu

Alasgar Mammadov (Azerbaijani: Ələsgər Cəfər oğlu Məmmədov; 10 October 1919 – 29 January 2000), also known as Ali Assger Mamedov or Ali Asgar Mammadov, was an Azerbaijani and Soviet orientalist, Arabist, pedagogue, honored scientist, and specialist in German and Arabic languages. He is considered the founder of modern Arabic studies in Azerbaijan. Mammadov was sought after for his innovations in instructive methodology of Arabic. He was also notable for his work as one of the two Azerbaijani translators at the Nuremberg trials of Nazi war criminals following World War II.

== Biography ==
=== Early years and education ===
Alasgar Mammadov was born on 10 October 1919 in Keshla, Baku and was raised by his uncle due to premature death of his parents.

After graduating from seven-year high school, Mammadov studied at the Baku Industrial Technical College named after Nariman Narimanov in 1933–1937 and at the German language department of the Azerbaijan State Pedagogical Institute in 1937–1941. Meanwhile, he taught German at the newly established Baku Higher Naval School. In July 1941, Mammadov was sent to Moscow to study Eastern languages together with representatives from Azerbaijan, Georgia and Armenia, after which he graduated from the Military Department of the Moscow Institute of Oriental Studies with an honours diploma.

=== Nuremberg trials ===
Since February 1945, Mammadov had started working as a chief reviewer in the People's Commissariat for Foreign Affairs of the USSR. Throughout this period he was involved in the Nuremberg process as a translator and German language specialist until February 1946. He was one of the two Azerbaijanis who participated in the international tribunal along with Enver Mamedov. While working in the ministry, Alasgar Mammadov translated a large part of the seized diplomatic documents, approximately more than 30, of the German Ministry of Foreign Affairs to Russian. When 26-year-old Mammadov was taking the German language exam in order to take part as the Soviet delegation member in Nuremberg, Grabor-Passak, the German language expert, was satisfied with him and recommended his participation.

Later, Alasgar Mammadov mentioned the following memories in his interviews about the Nuremberg Tribunal:

24 major military criminals were involved in the trial, but only 21 of them sat in the dock; Gustav Krupp, one of the main offenders, was terminally ill, while Robert Ley took his own life, and Martin Bormann had disappeared. The seats of the defendants in the hall were very close to where I was sitting. Hermann Göring was two or three steps away from me; he often used to rest his chin on the front row. Meanwhile Rudolf Hess tended to cringe with embarrassment. Rosenberg would bite his nails. Among the defendants, Keitel was always jotting down something, while not doing so, he used to chew on his pencil. Julius Streicher was almost always snoozing, while Karl Dönitz, Erich Raeder and Hjalmar Schacht were completely serious.

— Alasgar Mammadov (1995)

=== Scientific and pedagogical work ===
Since August 1947, after marrying Shovkat khanim, Mammadov had started teaching and scientific activities at the Faculty of Oriental Studies of Baku State University. He was elected the dean of the faculty, after which he founded the Arabic language department in 1957 and headed this department for 29 years. In 1947-1950, he worked as a senior lecturer at the university and completed postgraduate studies in Arabic language. In 1953, he was awarded the degree of Doctor of Sciences in Philological Sciences. Mammadov became an associate professor in 1954 and a professor in 1967. Then, he was awarded the title of Honored Scientist in 1992.

In addition to Arabic, Alasgar Mammadov was also fluent in Russian, German, French, Persian and English. He is the author of more than 30 Arabic language textbooks. Mammadov's first 573-page Arabic Language textbook was published in 1958 in the Soviet Union with an initial print run of 5,000 copies and used not only in Azerbaijan, but also in Tajikistan and Uzbekistan. His Арабский язык (Arabic Language) textbook, written in Russian, meets the needs of educators in oriental studies centers of Dagestan, Tatarstan, Ukraine, Central Asian Republics and other Post-Soviet states. The books prepared by Alasgar Mammadov were intended for the Russian and Azerbaijani sections of the Faculty of Oriental Studies, as well as for students of the Arabic language in the theology, history and philology faculties and Arabic-oriented secondary schools. In 1972, his Arabic Language textbook was sent to 22 countries according to the order.

In 1994, the Higher Attestation Commission under the President of the Republic of Azerbaijan awarded Alasgar Mammadov the degree of Doctor of Pedagogical Sciences without defending a doctoral thesis.

In the 1990s, Mammadov taught Quran at the Faculty of Oriental Studies of Baku State University.

== Death ==
Alasgar Mammadov died on 29 January 2000. He was treated at the Republican Clinical Hospital named after Mirasadulla Mirgasimov until his death.

== Legacy ==
"Aztelefilm" Creative Union of the AzTV made a full-length film, Ömürdən qalan izlər (Traces of Life), about the life of Alasgar Mammadov based on the screenplay by Rafiga Masud.
