= Qum, Azerbaijan =

Qum
- Municipality
- Location within Azerbaijan Location within Shaki-Zagatala Economic Region
- Coordinates: 41°27′26″N 46°54′35″E
- Country: Azerbaijan
- Rayon: Qakh

Population
  - Total: 1,954
- Time zone: UTC+4 (AZT)
  - Summer (DST): UTC+5 (AZT)

Qum (also Kum, pronounced Gum) is a village and municipality in the Qakh Rayon of Azerbaijan. It has a population of 1,954.

== See also ==
- Basilica in Qum village
