= Basilica in Qum village =

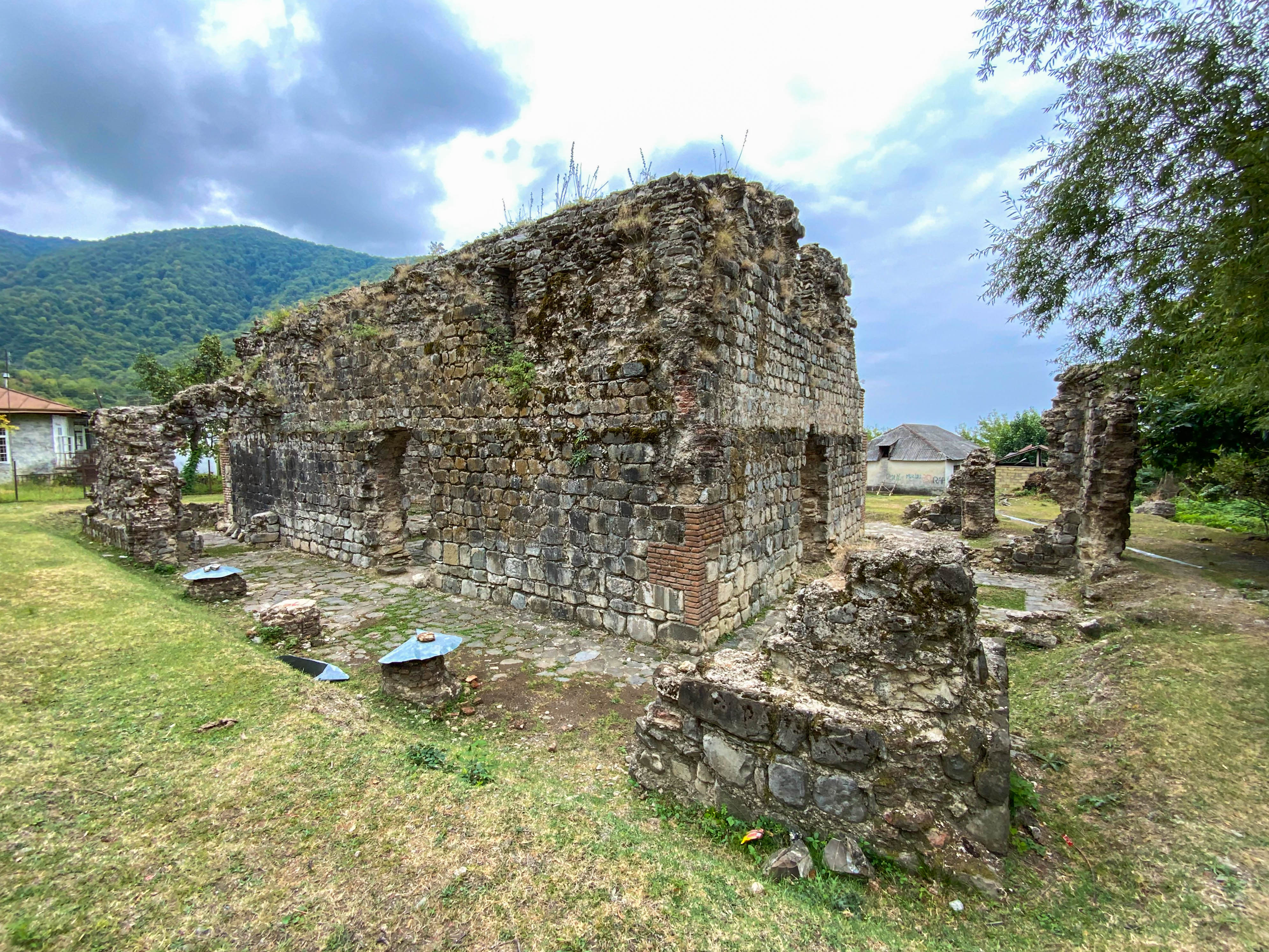

- Location within Azerbaijan

Religion
- Affiliation: Georgian Orthodox Church
- Status: Not functioning

Location
- Location: Qakh District, Azerbaijan
- Coordinates: 41.458531°N 46.911083°E

The Gum basilica is a three-aisled, domed Georgian temple of the 6–7th centuries, located in the Gum village of the Gakh district of Azerbaijan. In the scientific literature, the temple is called a basilica,. Has typological similarities with some earlier temples in Armenia and Georgia

== History ==
The Gum basilica is one of the earliest explored monuments of the Christian period in the Georgian kingdom of Hereti. For the first time, the monument was introduced into the scientific use by A.S.Khakhanov, who gave a brief description of it in a report of the expedition to the Caucasus. Subsequently, the basilica was thoroughly examined and studied by G.N.Chubinashvili and P.D.Baranovsky, who dated the temple with the 6th century.

The basilica is identified with the temple built in the village of Gomenk, mentioned in the work of Movses Kaghankatvatsi the History of Albania. According to a version, the Caucasian Albania's ruler Vachagan III the Pious ordered to build this monument on the site where the Palestinian Christian missionary Elisha was murdered by fire worshipers.

== Architectural features ==
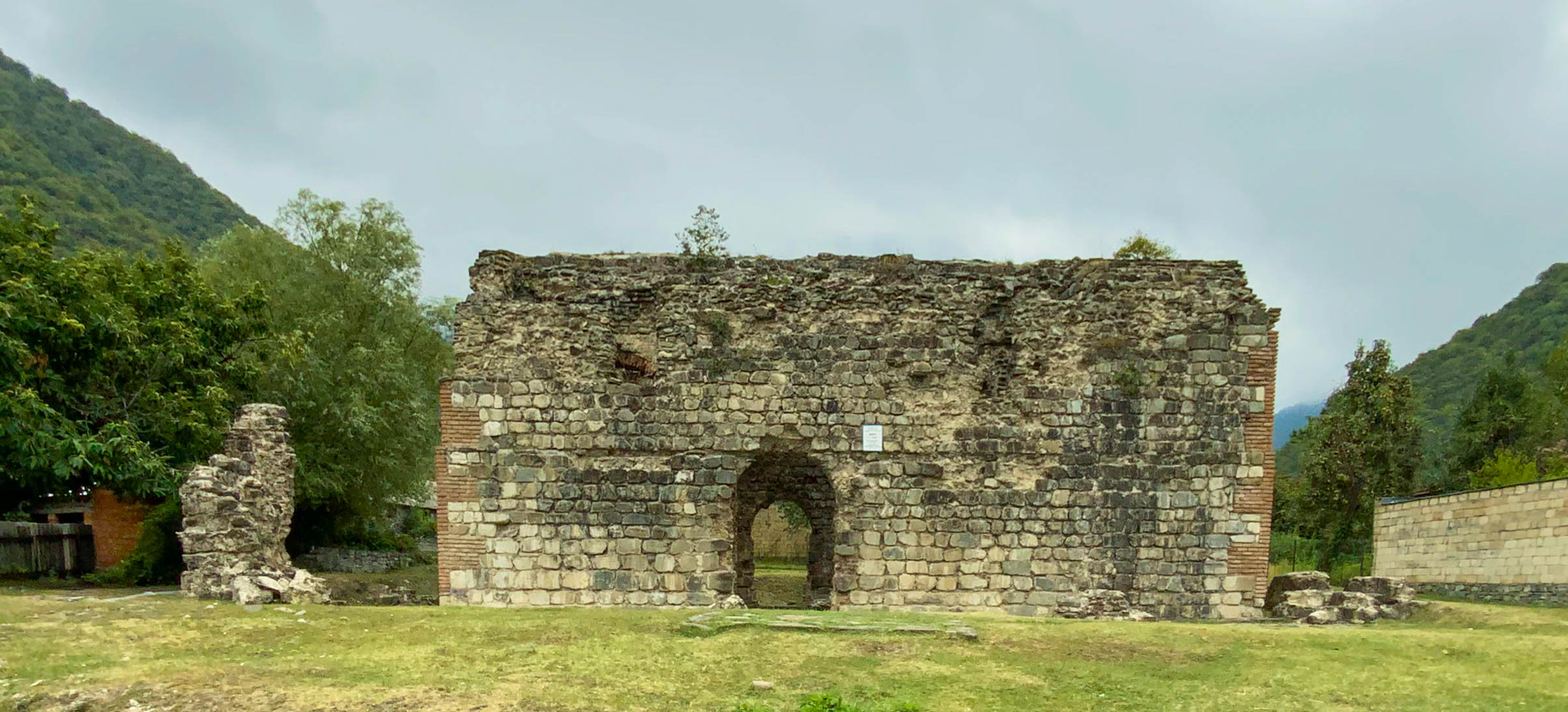
View of the ruins of the basilica from the east side

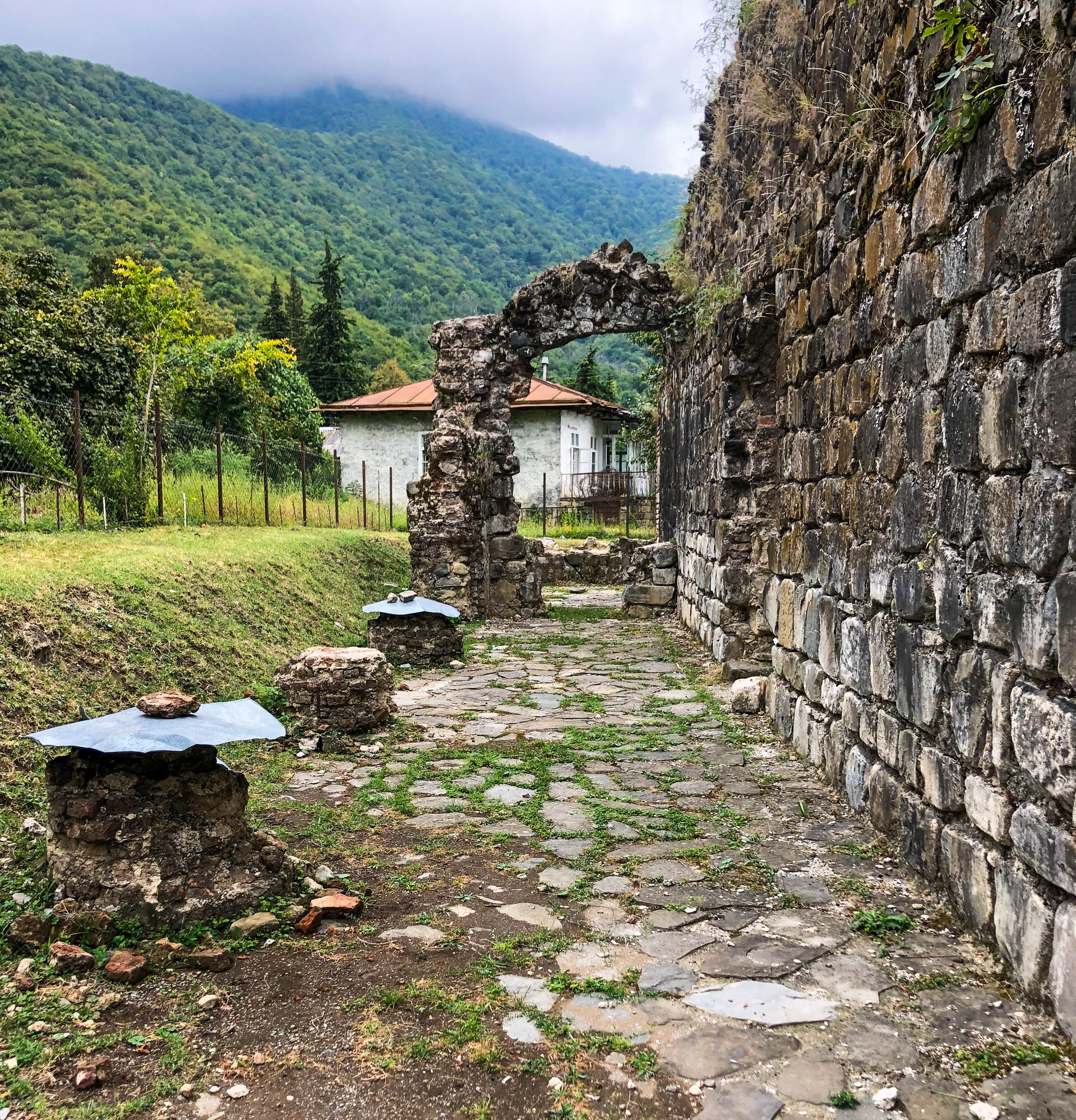
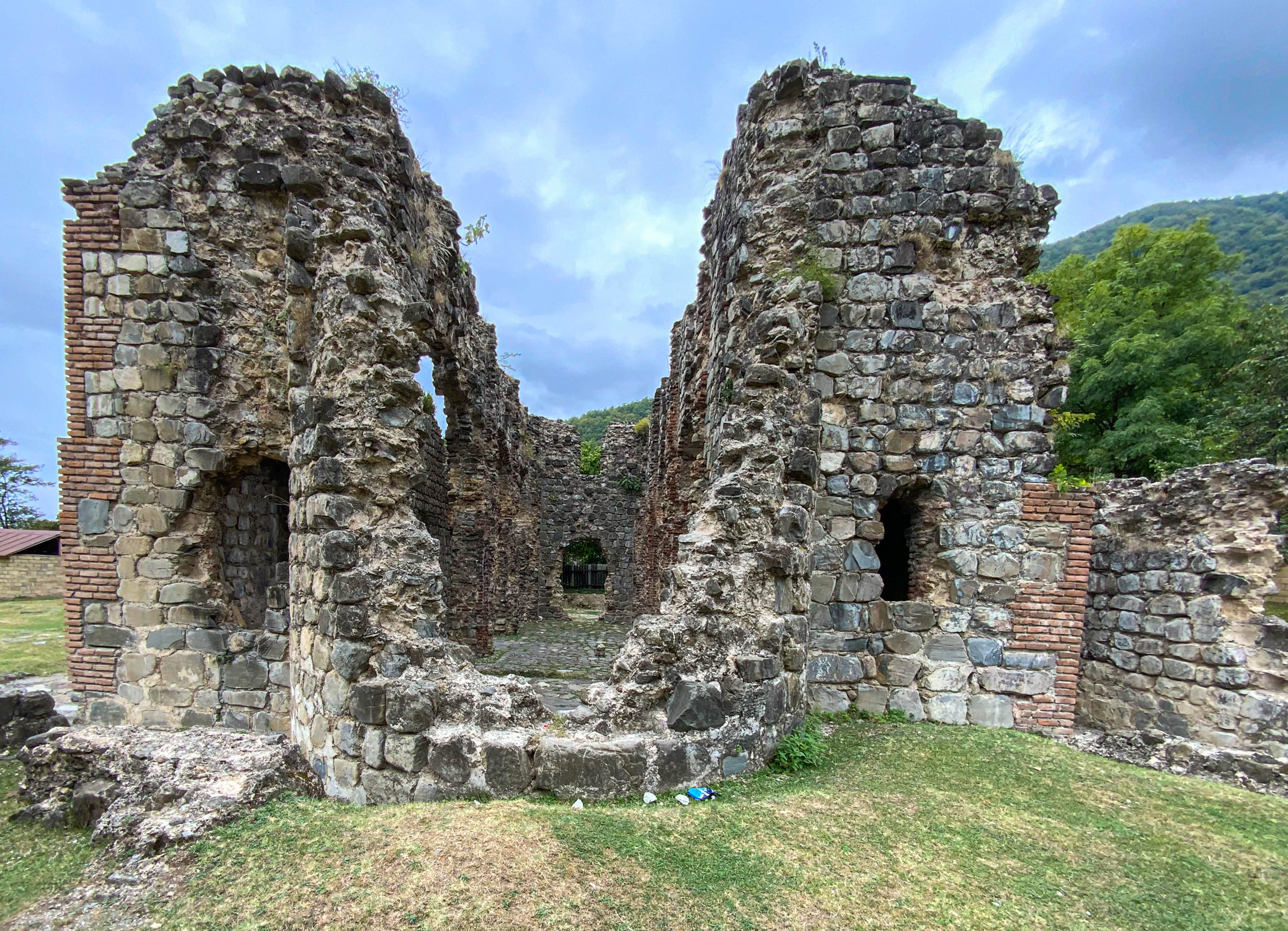
The ruins of the basilica gallery's colonnades (left)
and the facade's view of the altar's side of the temple ruins (right)

The temple's ruins are located in the center of the Gum village in the Gakh district. Only the main volume of the three-aisled basilica has survived to nowadays having the ceiling preserved in some places. The fragments of the walls of small eastern aisles and the remains of pillars of the western gallery remind of the once existed tripartite gallery.

The internal volume consists of a rectangular hall (36.5x19.3), divided into three naves by two pairs of L-shaped, free-standing pillars and a pair of strongly protruding pilasters.

The middle nave is almost three times wider than the others and ends in the east with an altar part protruding horseshoe-shaped apse. The side naves pass into square aisles, in which overlapping elements in the form of a closed vault have been preserved. The main volume was surrounded by a tripartite bypass forming galleries on the southern, northern and western facades. In the eastern part of the northern and southern galleries there are elongated rooms with apses protruding from the eastern facade.

The temple's walls were raised from bluish and dark green cobblestones in compliance with straight rows of masonry. Fired square bricks were also used in the constructions. In the places where the stones of the outer cladding had fallen out, rubble concrete filling was exposed. The combination of brick and cobblestone in the walls' masonry of the temple gave Chubinashvili the reason to date the temple to the 8-9th centuries.

Meanwhile, I. A. Babayev notes: “... it should be taken into account that in Azerbaijan, since ancient times, a combination of raw brick with cobblestone has been used, for example, in Kultepe II, and burnt brick was found in the buildings of the Caucasian Albania in the 1st century AD.”

According to G. Mammadova, even in the first centuries AD, in the traditional brick-cobblestone combination, the adobe could be replaced by the burnt brick that came into use. Beshbarmakh fortifications, the construction of which dates back to the pre-Arab period, also have this combination of wall material.

The T-shaped in terms of archaic internal foundations of the temple are made of rubble-concrete mass with facing square bricks. Most of the overlays have not been preserved. Researchers point to the box vaults of the side aisles. The ceiling of the middle nave rested on the walls raised above the arches thrown between the pillars and from them to the pilasters of the western wall and the altar ledges. The longitudinal arches have been preserved, while the existence of the transverse ones is indicated by the rubble-concrete strips protruding on the longitudinal walls and continuing the pillars' vertical.

The researchers of the Gum basilica restored its unpreserved ceiling in the form of a wooden one with a pitched roof truss.
