= Azerbaijan University of Architecture and Construction =

Architectural university in Baku, Azerbaijan

Coordinates: 40°22′12″N 49°48′48″E

- Azərbaycan Memarlıq və İnşaat Universiteti
- Type: Public
- Established: 1975
- Rector: Prof. Gulchohra Mammadova
- Location: 5 Ayna Sultanova St., Baku AZ1073, Azerbaijan, Baku, Azerbaijan
- Campus: Urban
- Website: www.azmiu.edu.az

University rankings

Global – Overall
- QS World: 1001-1200 (2026)

Regional – Overall
- QS Emerging Europe and Central Asia: 401-450 (2022)

Azerbaijan University of Architecture and Construction (AUAC; Azerbaijani: Azərbaycan Memarlıq və İnşaat Universiteti) is a state university located in Baku, Azerbaijan, specializing in civil engineering and architecture. The university was established in 1975 as a spin-off from the Azerbaijan Technical University, named Azerbaijan Civil Engineering Institute.

== History ==
AUAC started out in 1920 as a Construction faculty within the Baku Polytechnic Institute. In 1930–34, AUAC operated as an independent Construction and Architecture Institute, from 1934 as a faculty in the Azerbaijan Industrial Institute, and from 1951 as a faculty in the Azerbaijan Technical University.

In 1975, Azerbaijan Civil Engineering Institute was established with the decision of Azerbaijan SSR Council of Ministers. The institute received the status of a university in 1992. After the decision made by Azerbaijani President Heydar Aliyev on June 13, 2000, the name of the university became Azerbaijan University of Architecture and Construction.

== General information ==
The staff of 700 professors and teachers prepare engineer specialists. Out of 700, 100 are Doctors of Sciences, more than 400 are candidates of sciences, senior lecturers and head teachers. Along with them, leading specialists of the State Building Complex are also involved in the teaching process. The university has 42 departments. They are social-political, humanitarian, common sciences, technical and speciality departments. The financial and technical base of the university consolidates year by year. Most departments are equipped with modern facilities, computers and laboratories. Students have opportunities to spend quality time in their leisure time. There are chess clubs, a sports stadium, a concert hall and cafés. The university publishes a newspaper which reflects the university life. The university also has a modern library which contained 2 halls for renting books, 3 reading halls, an architecture cabinet and a foreign students cabinet. Library equipped with 3m technology.

== International relations ==
The University's international relations are carried out through the following structures;

- Deanery of foreign students
- Faculties for preparing foreign students
- International Relations Department

Deanery of Foreign Students has been operating since 1977 and aim to prepare specialists for foreign countries. Over the past period, about 1000 students from more than 40 countries have graduated from university. Currently, there are approximately 400 students and aspirants from 15 countries of the world are studying at the university.

Foreign citizens studying at AUAC are placed in the dormitory. The deanery of foreign students contact with relevant departments of foreign universities and other organizations. There are 65 instructors involved in tuition of foreign citizens.

Within the faculty exchange program the university collaborates with the universities of Algeria, Tunisia, Mali, Senegal, Guinea, Iran, Japan, Yemen, England, Afghanistan, Cambodia, India, Ethiopia, Turkey etc.).

The Faculty of Architecture of Azerbaijan University of Architecture and Construction has received the 5-year accreditation (Part 1) of the Royal Institute of British Architects (RIBA), known worldwide in the field of Architecture.

== Collaborating universities ==
Azerbaijan University of Architecture and Construction is collaborating with various universities from different countries such as Russia, Kazakhstan, Uzbekistan, Georgia, Ukraine, South Korea, Iran, Turkey, Egypt, Italy, England, Austria, France, Estonia, Czech Republic, Spain, Poland, Belgium and so on.

Country	Universities	date
Russia	Moscow State University of Geodesy and Cartography Moscow State University of Construction Kazan State University of Architecture and Engineering Scientific-Research and Design Institute (Ural branch) Samara State University of Architecture and Construction Saratov State Technical University Penza State University of Architecture and Construction Novosibirsk State Architectural and Construction University Moscow Architectural Institute Novosibirsk State Architectural and Art Academy Rostov State Construction University Siberian Federal University Tomsk State Architectural and Construction University Ufa State Petroleum Technological University Tambov State Technical University Saint Petersburg State University of Architecture and Civil Engineering	2011 2011 2011 2012 2012 2013 2013 2013 2014 2014 2014 2014 2014 2014 2014 2018
Kazakhstan	Kazakh Leading Academy of Architecture and Civil Engineering	2012
Uzbekistan	Tashkent Architectural and Construction University	2013
Georgia	Georgia State Art Academy Georgian Technical University	2013 2014
Ukraine	Odesa State Architecture and Construction Academy Kyiv National University of Construction and Architecture	2011 2011
South Korea	Pusan National University Konkuk University	2011 2012
Iran	Seraj Higher Education Institute Tabriz University	2009 2009
Turkey	Ankara University Istanbul Technical University Mimar Sinan University Hacettepe University Gazi University Atatürk University Bartin University Osmangazi University Sakarya University Middle East Technical University Yildiz Technical University	2009 2011 2011 2012 2013 2013 2013 2013 2013 2009
Egypt	Cairo University	
Italy	Sapienza University Florence University Politecnico di Torino Polytechnic University of Turin University of Pavia Polytechnic University of Milan Siegen University	2011 2012 2012 2012 2012 2012 2012
England	Northampton University Anglia Ruskin University	2013 2014
Austria	Vienna Technical University	2010
France	University of Montpellier	2012
Estonia	Tallinn University	2012
Czech Republic	Mazaryk University	2012
Spain	University of Alicante University of Cordoba University of A Coruña	2012 2012 2012
Poland	Adam Mickiewicz Technology and Life Sciences University University of Lodz	2012 2012 2013
Belgium	University of Antwerp	2012
Portugal	Lisbon Technical University Polytechnic Institute of Tomar University of Fernando Pesso Leiria Universitety	2012 2012 2012 2012
Sweden	Royal Institute of Technology	2012
Lithuania	Vilnyus Gediminas Technical University	2012
Greece	University of Patras	
Latvia	Information Systems Management Institute	2012

== Majors ==
- Construction Economics and its management
- Management (Construction)
- Marketing (Construction)
- Architecture
- Design of architectural environment
- Restoration and reconstruction of architectural monuments
- Garden, park and landscape construction
- Industrial and civil construction
- Hydraulic construction
- Municipal construction and its operation
- Construction of melioration engineering systems
- Heating gas supply and ventilation
- Water supply and irrigation
- Railway construction and its operation
- Construction of motorways and airports
- Bridges and transport tunnels
- Production technology on building materials, products and construction
- Woodworking technology
- Technology of refractory, non-metallic and silicate materials
- The application geodesy
- Electrical supply of industrial enterprises of construction and construction materials.
- Automation of technological processes and production in construction.
- Construction, road machinery and equipment
- Machinery and equipment for building materials and construction industry
- Physics of Material (Construction)
- Material Science and New Materials Technology (Construction)
- Mechanization and automation (construction)
- Mechanization of construction works of hydraulic engineering systems
- Life Safety (Construction)
- Water resources protection and complex utilization

== Affiliations ==
The university is a member of the Caucasus University Association.

== Faculties ==
- Faculty of Political Management
- Faculty of Administrative Management
- Faculty of Management Retraining
