= Elkhan Mammadov =

Elkhan Mammadov may refer to:

- Elkhan Mammadov (judoka) (born in 1982), Azerbaijani judoka
- Elkhan Mammadov (fencer) (born in 1969), Azerbaijani fencer
