= Gulchohra Mammadova =

Azerbaijani architect and academician

- Gülçöhrə Hüseyn qızı Məmmədova
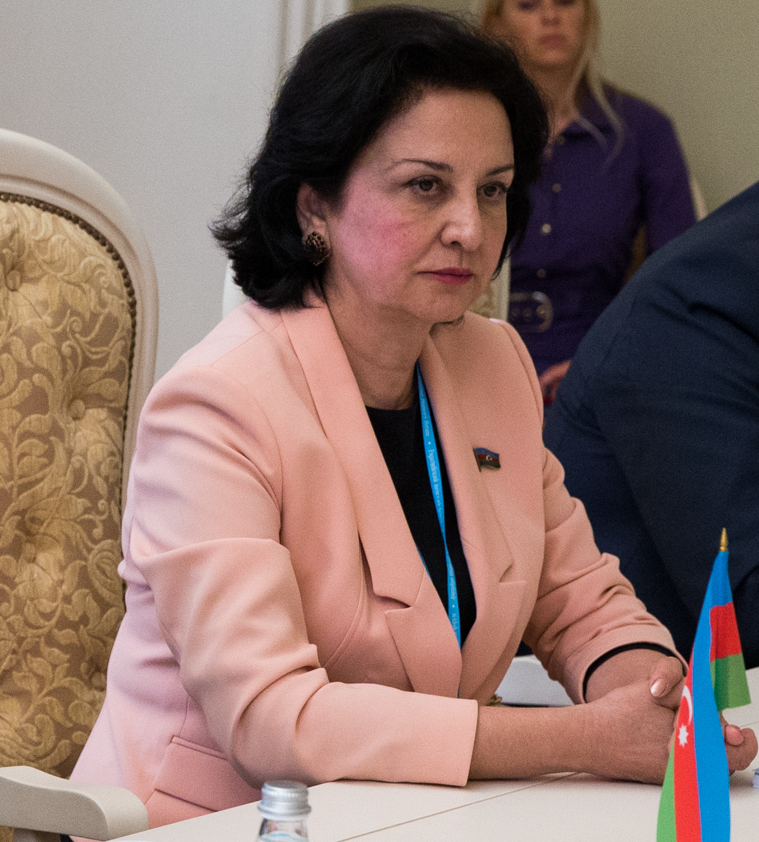
- Mammadova in 2015
- Born: Gulchohra Huseyn gizi Mammadova; April 24, 1953 (age 73); Ararat Province, Armenian SSR, Soviet Union
- Education: Azerbaijan Polytechnic Institute; Azerbaijan Institute of Civil Engineers
- Known for: Architect
- Father: Huseyin Mammadov
- Awards: Ordre des Palmes académiques 2009; Academician Mikayil Huseynov commemorative medal 2013; Shohrat Order; 2013

Gulchohra Huseyn gizi Mammadova (Azerbaijani: Gülçöhrə Hüseyn qızı Məmmədova) is an Azerbaijani architect, academician, Doctor of Architecture, and the current president (rector) of Azerbaijan University of Architecture and Construction. She was also a deputy in the Azerbaijani National Assembly from 2000 to 2005.

== Early years ==
Gulchohra Huseyn gizi Mammadova was born on 24 April 1953 to an Azerbaijani family, in Ararat Province of the Armenian SSR, which was then part of the Soviet Union. Her father, Huseyn Mammadov, was a public and political figure in Armenia. He served in high political positions for many years, and was a member of the Supreme Soviet of Armenia for three terms. After graduating from high school in 1971, she entered the architectural faculty of the Azerbaijan Polytechnic Institute and in 1976, graduated from the architectural faculty of the newly established Azerbaijan Institute of Civil Engineers.

== Scientific career ==
In September 1975, Mammadova was elected secretary of the Komsomol of the Azerbaijan Institute of Civil Engineers and held this position until 1979. In 1979, she began working as an assistant at the Department of Architectural Constitutions and Restoration of Monuments of the same institute. In 1987, Mammadova was elected headteacher of the department; in 1991, associate professor; and in 2000, professor. In 1999, she was appointed president (rector) of the Azerbaijan University of Architecture and Construction.

Mammadova's scientific activity is mainly related to the study of the architecture of Caucasian Albania and Christian religious architecture in the territory of modern-day Azerbaijan, authoring more than 70 scientific works, including 2 monographs, 5 books, and more than 60 articles. She had worked on the restoration and scientific reconstruction projects of many monuments, including the Church of Kish, the Church of Nij, and the Qum Basilica. In 1985, she defended her dissertation on Early medieval Christian architecture of Caucasian Albania, in 1999, she defended her doctoral thesis on Religious architecture of Caucasian Albania.

She has participated in the organization of many international scientific conferences and made presentations, led several international projects related to the restoration of architectural monuments. She has been a member of the Union of Architects of Azerbaijan since 1985. She is a member of the Eastern European Branch of the International Academy of Sciences and the International Academy of Oriental Architecture. In 2006, she received the honorary title of Honored Architect of Azerbaijan. On 9 February 2009, Mammadova was awarded the Ordre des Palmes académiques. The order was presented to Mammadova by French Ambassador to Azerbaijan Gabriel Keller. In 2013, she was awarded the Academician Mikayil Huseynov commemorative medal, and the Shohrat Order.

== Political career ==
She was a deputy in the Azerbaijani National Assembly from 2000 to 2005 (II convocation), and from 2010 to 2015 (IV convocation), representing the ruling New Azerbaijan Party.
