= Seyidli, Agdam =

Seyidli
- Location within Azerbaijan Location within Karabakh Economic Region
- Coordinates: 40°00′01″N 46°55′16″E
- Country: Azerbaijan
- Rayon: Agdam
- Time zone: UTC+4 (AZT)
  - Summer (DST): UTC+5 (AZT)

Seyidli is a village in the Agdam Rayon of Azerbaijan. Azerbaijan recaptured the village during 2020 Nagorno-Karabakh conflict. Azerbaijan Ministry of defence published video footages of the village on 23 December 2020 showing full destruction of the village during Armenian occupation.
