= Govhar Bakhshaliyeva =

Azerbaijani academic and politician

Govhar Bakhshaliyeva (born November 1954 in Baku) is an Azerbaijani academic and politician. She is the director of the Institute of Oriental Studies of the Azerbaijan National Academy of Sciences.

== Academic background and career ==
After finishing high school in 1972, Bakhshaliyeva entered the Arabic branch of the Oriental Studies faculty of Azerbaijan State University (ASU). In 1977, she graduated from ASU with an honours degree and was employed at the Institute of Oriental Studies of the Azerbaijan National Academy of Sciences, where she held positions of senior laboratory assistant, junior research officer, and chief of the Arabian Philology department.

Since 1993, Bakhshaliyeva has held the position of deputy director on science of the Institute of Oriental Studies, and since 1997 she has been working as the Institute's director. She is an Academician of the International Academy of Sciences, and is an expert in the field of classic and modern Arabic literature, Arab-speaking Azerbaijan literature, comparative literary criticism, literary communications and source study.

== Political career ==
On November 5, 2000 Bakhshaliyeva was elected a deputy of the Milli Majlis of the Republic of Azerbaijan representing election district No. 57, covering Barda and Aghjabadi. From June 2001 to December 2005, she held a position of Vice Speaker of Milli Majlis. As the Vice Speaker, she was in charge of social legislation. In November 2005, Bakhshaliyeva was again elected a deputy of Milli Majlis. She is a member of the Standing Committee on Science and Education.

In 2013, Bakhshaliyeva supported a ban on hijab in Azerbaijan.
