= Rufet Guliyev =

Azerbaijani politician (born 1963)

Rufet Guliyev Rüfət Quliyev

Member of the National Assembly of Azerbaijan
- Incumbent
- Assumed office November 6, 2005

Personal details
- Born: Rufat Atakishi oglu Quliyev; May 6, 1963 (age 63) Baku, Azerbaijan

Rufat Atakishi oglu Quliyev (Azerbaijani: Rüfət Atakişi oğlu Quliyev), known as Rufet Guliyev, was born in Baku on May 6, 1963. He was elected as a deputy of the National Assembly of Azerbaijan (Milli Majlis) on the III, IV, V and VI convening's, and nowadays he is a member of the Committee on Economic Policy, a vice-chairman of the Permanent Commission of the IPA CIS on Political Issues and International Cooperation, a member of the Working group on culture, science and education of GUAM, Dr. of Economics, Professor, head of an academic department in Azerbaijan Technical University, professor of Taras Shevchenko National University of Kyiv. He is a member in Council of experts of the Economy section of the Higher Attestation Commission under the President of Azerbaijan and recently has been selected as a Member of the Expert Council on Economics at the CIS Inter-parliamentary Assembly.

== Biography ==
Guliyev entered the Economics Department of Kyiv State University (now, Taras Shevchenko National University of Kyiv) in 1981 and graduated from it in 1986. The same year he began pedagogical activity in the Azerbaijan Technical University (former Azerbaijan Polytechnical Institute). He worked as a chief laboratory worker, lecturer, senior lecturer, docent and a professor at the University.

Since 1995 Guliyev is a candidate of philosophy in economy and since 2004 he is a Doctor of economics. Since 2006 he is a Professor of the Azerbaijan Technical University. Nowadays, Guliyev is the head of the "Economic theory and economy of service areas" academic department at the University.

He is the author of nearly 300 scientific works and articles (which include 7 monographs, 4 study books, 3 brochures), 41 of which were published in authoritative scientific magazines of the US, Turkey, Russia, Ukraine, Czech Republic, Slovakia, Latvia, Estonia, Kazakhstan, Sweden and other countries. He is an active participator of local and international scientific conferences, forums and seminars. He continuously participated in symposiums in Nice, London, Kiev, and also produced fundamental speeches on development ways of Azeri economy and achieved successes at conferences, held by Azeri government in Great Britain, Russia, Ukraine, Italy, Public Republic of China, Kuwait, Germany, Northern Cyprus, Latvia, Moldova, Kazakhstan and the UAE.

Since 1999 until 2017 Guliyev was a chairperson of the Executive Board of the "European Tobacco-Baku". Since 2003, Guliyev is a member of Board of Trustees of the Azerbaijan Export and Investment Promotion Foundation. He is a co-chairperson of the Azerbaijan-Turkey Businessmen Union.

Guliyev is the head of the working group on Azerbaijan-Ukraine interparliamentary relations and a member of the working groups on Azerbaijan-Italy, Azerbaijan-India, Azerbaijan-Denmark interparliamentary relations. He was in many foreign trips via Milli Majlis and the IPA CIS, participated as an observer in most of the presidential and parliamentary elections organized in CIA countries and works purposefully and effectively in direction of delivering Azeri realities to the world community.

He was awarded with the "For specific merits in defending workers' social-economic rights and interests" medal by Confederation of Trade Unions of Azerbaijan, the emeritus anniversary medal dedicated to 60 years of UN by International Human Rights Defence Committee, the emeritus medal by International Human Rights Defence Committee of Ministry of Justice of Ukraine, the emeritus anniversary medal dedicated to 20 years of CIS, three emeritus medals of Taras Shevchenko National University of Kyiv, the "Birimdik-Yedinstvo" order of "Birimdik-Yedinstvo" public foundation of Kyrgyzstan.

He participates actively in charity events.

He is nonpartisan.

Guliyev speaks Azerbaijani, Russian and English fluently.

He is married and has two children.

== Scientific research ==
Rufat Guliyev's theses are:

a) "Evolution of efficient usage factors of production funds in terms of transition towards market (on industry materials of Azerbaijan Republic)" - thesis for the degree of candidate of Economic Sciences. It was defended on May 16, 1995 on Academic Council of the Institute of National Economy (called Azerbaijan State Economic University nowadays) under speciality 08.00.01 (Economic theory).

b) "Investment problems of shaping of national economy of Azerbaijan" - thesis for the degree of Doctor of Economic Sciences. It was defended on February 20, 2004 on Academic Council of the Institute of Economy of Azerbaijan National Academy of Sciences under speciality 08.00.01 (Economic theory).

== See also ==
- National Assembly
- Government of Azerbaijan

== Links ==
- Official YouTube channel
- Феномен глобализации и Азербайджан
- Мировой кризис и экономика Азербайджана
- В Азербайджане будут созданы еще более благоприятные условия для бизнеса
- Налоговая политика в некоторых странах мира: анализ и сравнение
- Современные экономические теории и модели социально-экономического развития
- НОВАЯ СИТУАЦИЯ - Об экономической политике Азербайджана в постнефтяной период
- Международные наблюдатели положительно оценили выборы в Санкт-Петербурге
- Oqtay Esedov deputatlarla birge Rusiya gedir
- Azərbaycanlı deputat Kiyevdə “erməni soyqırımı”ını müzakirə etdi
- Deputat Rüfət Quliyev daimi komissiyanın sədr müavini seçilib
- Deputat Rüfət Quliyev Astanada Qələbənin 70 illiyi münasibətilə keçiriləcək tədbirdə iştirak edəcək
- Rüfət Quliyev: Avropa Azərbaycanla münasibətlərdən çox fayda qazanacaq
- SEMIMI RESMIYYET- Millet vekili Rufet Quliyev
- Rüfət Quliyev: Sahibkarlar kənd təsərrüfatı sahəsində onlara yaradılan şəraitdən yararlanmalıdırlar
- Rüfət Quliyev: "Ölkəmiz artıq investisiya edən ölkəyə çevrilib"
- Sosiologiya: nəzəriyyə və tədqiqat metodologiyası
- I Avropa Oyunları xidmət sektoru üçün imtahandır
- Deputat Rüfət Quliyev : “ Avropa qurumları Azərbaycanın qərarını düzgün qiymətləndirdi”
- Руфат Атакиши оглу Гулиев; Сильная экономика, могущественное государство, благополучная жизнь
- Наблюдатель из Азербайджана отмечает отсутствие погрешностей на избирательных участках в Беларуси
- Руфат Гулиев о выборах в Беларуси
- ВЫБОРЫ-2015. Руфат Гулиев – наблюдатель из Азербайджана – рассказал об обстановке на выборах-2015
- Привлечь туристов из СНГ легче, чем из Европы - МНЕНИЕ
- Azərbaycan parlament nümayəndə heyəti Belarusda prezident seçkilərini müşahidə edəcək
- Deputatlığa namizəd Rüfət Quliyev seçki platformasını açıqlayıb
- Rüfət Quliyev seçicilərlə görüşüb
- Rüfət Quliyev: “Seçicilərimin mənə etimad göstərəcəyinə inanıram”
- Deputat namizəd Rüfət Quliyev 5 ildəki xarici səfərləri barədə seçicilərə hesabat verib - FOTOSESSİYA
- Rüfət Quliyev “Bosco Conference”in açılışını edib - FOTO
- Rüfət Quliyev növbəti dəfə seçiciləri ilə görüşüb
- В Азербайджане будут созданы еще более благоприятные условия для бизнеса
- Новая ситуация - Об экономической политике Азербайджана в постнефтяной период
- В Азербайджане может появиться альтернатива льготным кредитам
- Руфат Гулиев: Реформы в Азербайджане, в отличие от Европы, носят систематический характер
- В Азербайджане предлагается ввести госконтроль за деятельностью ломбардов
- Депутаты поддерживают инициативу главы государства
- Политика Президента Ильхама Алиева направлена на ускорение развития экономики Азербайджана
- Как выход Великобритании из ЕС повлияет на Азербайджан - ПОДРОБНО
- Как BREXIT повлияет на курс маната - ПОДРОБНОСТИ
- Международные наблюдатели проверили готовность Петербурга к выборам
- Международные наблюдатели начали работу на избирательных участках Петербурга
- На выборах в Петербурге работают 12 наблюдателей от МПА СНГ
- Миссия МПА СНГ: выборы в Петербурге соответствуют международным стандартам
- Прямое включение: Международные наблюдатели отметили положительные изменения избирательной системы России
- Прямое включение: Явка на выборы в ЗакС на 12:00 составила почти 6%
- Политическая палитра Петербурга: предварительные итоги выборов в Госдуму и Законодательное собрание
- Deputat Rüfət Quliyev: “Rusiya Dövlət Dumasına seçkilər şəffaf keçirilib” – FOTOLAR
- Deputat Rüfət Quliyev: “Rusiya Dövlət Dumasına seçkilər şəffaf keçib”
- Deputat Rüfət Quliyev: “Rusiya Dövlət Dumasına seçkilər şəffaf keçib”
- Rüfət Quliyev: “Rusiya Dövlət Dumasına seçkilər şəffaf keçirilib”
- Deputat Rüfət Quliyev:“Rusiya Dövlət Dumasına seçkilər şəffaf keçib”
- “Rusiya Dövlət Dumasına seçkilər şəffaf keçib” - Deputat Rüfət Quliyev
- Deputat:“Rusiya Dövlət Dumasına seçkilər şəffaf keçib”
- Dumaya seçkilər şəffaf keçdi - Millət vəkili
- Milli Məclisin deputatı: Rusiya Dövlət Dumasına seçkilər şəffaf keçirilib
- DEPUTAT RÜFƏT QULIYEV:“RUSIYA DÖVLƏT DUMASINA SEÇKILƏR ŞƏFFAF KEÇIB”
- Milli Məclisin deputatı: Rusiya Dövlət Dumasına seçkilər şəffaf keçirilib
- Milli Məclisin deputatı: Rusiya Dövlət Dumasına seçkilər şəffaf keçirilib
- Deputat:“Rusiya Dövlət Dumasına seçkilər şəffaf keçib”
- Deputat Rüfət Quliyev: “Rusiya Dövlət Dumasına seçkilər şəffaf keçib”
- Dumaya seckiler seffaf kecdi – Millet vekili
- Deputat Rüfət Quliyev Sankt-Peterburqda RAGT fəalları ilə görüşüb – FOTOLAR
- DEPUTAT RÜFƏT QULIYEV SANKT-PETERBURQ ŞƏHƏRINDƏ RUSIYANIN AZƏRBAYCANLI GƏNCLƏR TƏŞKILATININ ( RAGT) FƏALLARI ILƏ GÖRÜŞÜB
- Sankt-Peterburqda Rusiyanın Azərbaycanlı Gənclər Təşkilatının fəalları ilə görüş keçirilib
- Sankt-Peterburqda konstitusiya dəyişikliyi ilə bağlı tədbir keçirilib
- Sankt-Peterburqda “Azərbaycanda Konstitusiya islahatları” mövzusunda dəyirmi masa keçirilib
- Sankt-Peterburqda Rusiyanın Azərbaycanlı Gənclər Təşkilatının fəalları ilə görüş keçirilib
- Sankt-Peterburqda “Azərbaycanda Konstitusiya islahatları” mövzusunda dəyirmi masa keçirilib
- Millət vəkili Sankt-Peterburqda RAGT fəalları ilə görüşüb
- Millət vəkilləri “AMOR”-un tədbirində-Fotolar
- Referendum Rusiyadakı azərbaycanlı gənclərlə müzakirə edilib FOTO
- Referendum Rusiyadakı azərbaycanlı gənclərlə müzakirə edilib FOTO
- Moskvada Baş Konsul, deputatlar və Azərbaycan diasporu referendumu müzakirə ediblər-FOTO
- ГОЛОСУЕМ ЗА СВОЕ БУДУЩЕЕ
- Deputat: “Cəmiyyətimizdə varlılara qarşı küdurət və həsəd var”
- “MSK hər bir faktı ciddi araşdıracaq”
- Международные наблюдатели положительно оценили выборы в Санкт-Петербурге
- Pirallahı rayonunda seçici fəallığı yüksək qiymətləndirilib
- Deputat Rüfət Quliyev görüşdə Ukraynada azərbaycanlılara qarşı olan diskriminasıya hallarından danışıb
- "Ukraynalı deputatlar belə hadisələrdən çox narahatdırlar"- Rüfət Quliyev
- "Azərbaycan mətbuatında soydaşlarımızın oğurlanması statistikası şişirdilir"
- DİN: Ukraynada azərbaycanlıların oğurlanması məsələsi şişirdilərək ictimaiyyətə təqdim olunur
- Ukraynadakı azərbaycanlıların problemləri müzakirə olunub
- "Ukraynada azərbaycanlıların oğurlanması məsələsi şişirdilir" - DİN
- Deputat Rüfət Quliyev: Ukraynada yaşayan azərbaycanlıların təhlükəsizliyi üçün bütün tədbirlər görülür
- Millət vəkili Rüfət Quliyev Ukraynada azərbaycanlılara qarşı olan diskriminasıya hallarına etiraz edib
- Kiyevdə diaspor nümayəndələri toplandı
- DİN rəsmisi:"Ukraynada azərbaycanlıların oğurlanması məsələsi şişirdilir"
- Ukraynada yaşayan azərbaycanlıların vəziyyəti müzakirə edilib
- Rüfət Quliyev bu il də Bosco Conference-in açılışını edib - FOTO
- Rüfət Quliyev bu il də Bosco Conference-in açılışını edib-FOTO
- Millət vəkili Bosco Conference-in açılışını edib
- Deputat beynəlxalq konfransda ölkəmizdəki sabitlikdən danışdı
- Bakıda beynəlxalq konfrans keçirilir
- Rüfət Quliyev bu il də Bosco Conference-in açılışını edib
- Rüfət Quliyev bu il də Bosco Conference-in açılışını edib - FOTO
- Малое семейное предпринимательство в различных странах мира и Азербайджан
- Deputat: “Azərbaycan birinci devalvasiyanı şok formada keçirdi, indi isə…”
- “Ukraynadakı Azərbaycan diasporları arasında ziddiyyət var” - MÜSAHİBƏ
- Deputat: “İşgüzar insanlara həmişə yol açıqdır”
- İnvestorlar vergidən azad olundu - Prezident iş yerlərinin çoxalmasına yeni şans açdı
- Ərzaq qiymətlərində növbəti bahalaşma dalğası başlanır?
- “Bu artımın imkansız ailələrə zərbəsi dəyməyəcək” - Millət vəkili
- Universitet məzunlarından millət vəkilinə təşəkkür - Foto
- Taras Şevçenko adına Kiyev Milli Universitetinin məzunlarından açıqlama gəldi
- “Əmrahbank” susur… Palatada isə hələ fikirləşirlər? – TƏHLİL
- Millət vəkili Rüfət Quliyev televiziyaların fəaliyyətindən narazılığını bildirib
- Müğənnilər daha çox vergiyə cəlb olunsun- TƏKLİF
- Руфат Гулиев о повышении лимитов льготного потребления газа и электроэнергии
- Deputat: Tarif Şurasının yeni qərarı ölkə rəhbərliyinin aztəminatlı əhaliyə qayğısını göstərir
- Rüfət Quliyev: “Neftdən itirdiyimizdən də artıq gəlirlər əldə edəcəyik” – MÜSAHİBƏ
- Azərbaycan iqtisadi inkişaf modeli yeni bir mərhələyə qədəm qoyur
- Как в мире стимулируют переход на безналичные расчеты?
- Deputat Rüfət Quliyev: “İctimai və humanitar fənlərin bütün universitetlərdə tədrisi zəruridir”
- Электронные деньги – миллион в кармане
- Deputat: "Azərbaycan 2016-cı ildə makroiqtisadi göstəriciləri planlaşdırılmış səviyyədə saxlaya bildi"
- Transparency International вновь дискредитирует Баку и Москву
- MM-in deputatı: Azərbaycan 2016-cı ildə makroiqtisadi göstəriciləri planlaşdırılmış səviyyədə saxlaya bildi
- Azərbaycan iqtisadiyyatı dayanıqlıdır, dinamikdir
- Millət vəkili Rüfət Quliyev “Gənclərin dostu” mükafatına layiq görüldü
- Нужны ли нам общественные науки?
- Lənkəranda ötən ilin yekunları müzakirə edildi
- С чем связаны сообщения о дефиците сигарет в Баку?
- Nizami rayonunda 2016-cı ilin yekunları müzakirə olunub
- Xocalı faciəsi bəşəriyyətə qarşı cinayətdir
- “Bəzi məmurlar cənab Prezidentin bu fərmanından ibrət dərsi götürməlidir”
- Rüfət Quliyev: “Mehriban Əliyeva bir çox taleyüklü təşəbbüslərin müəllifi, xalqımızın sevimlisidir”
- Bakıda Ukrayna ilə Azərbaycan arasında diplomatik münasibətlərin 25 illiyi qeyd edilib
- Azərbaycan-Ukrayna parlamentlərarası əlaqələr daha da genişlənir
- Siqaret çəkənlərə qarşı qanunlar sərtləşdirilir
- Руфат Гулиев: Бренд «Made in Azerbaijan» обречен на успех за рубежом
- Руфат Гулиев: В стране созданы все условия для развития ненефтяного сектора
- Deputat Rüfət Quliyev: Neofaşizm və neonasizmi baş qaldırmağa qoymayaq
- InvestPro Азербайджан Баку 2017
- ИНКУБАТОР РЕФОРМ - Азербайджан улучшает бизнес-среду и инвестиционную привлекательность
- Руфат Гулиев: Азербайджан успешно выстраивает экономическую политику, направленную на развитие ненефтяного сектора
- В Азербайджане предложили запретить производство сигарет без фильтра и кальяны
- Азербайджан - ЕС: общие интересы с прицелом на продолжительное партнерство
- Millət vəkili Rüfət Quliyevin “Dünya iqtisadiyyatı və Azərbaycan” adlı kitabı işıq üzü gördü
- Сельское хозяйство остается одним из важных сегментов экономики Азербайджана
- Для развития табаководства в Азербайджане необходимо привлечь международных специалистов

"Trend" information agency:

- Azerbaijani election authority announces tentative parliamentary election results
- Opinion Way announces results of exit poll in Azerbaijan’s parliamentary election
- Results of exit poll in Azerbaijan’s polling stations announced
- Azerbaijani people’s interests outweighed economic aspects – MP
- Azerbaijani MPs to observe parliamentary election in Kazakhstan
- Azerbaijani MPs to observe parliamentary elections in Ukraine
- Moscow to host next meeting of Russian-Azerbaijani interparliamentary commission
- Azerbaijani parliament speaker to attend CIS PA meeting
- Delegation headed by Azerbaijani parliament’s speaker leaves for Almaty
- Azerbaijani speaker to participate in events to mark CIS PA anniversary
- Azerbaijani MPs to observe presidential elections in Russia
- Azerbaijani MPs to observe elections in Kazakhstan
- Azerbaijan to partake in meeting of Council of CIS Interparliamentary Assembly
- Azerbaijani parliamentary chairman to participate in CIS PA meeting (UPDATE)
- Personnel elected to Azerbaijani parliamentary committees (UPDATE)
- Central Election Commission of Azerbaijan announces preliminary results of parliamentary elections (UPDATE 4)
- Results of exit-poll in parliamentary elections in Azerbaijan disclosed (UPDATE 2) (PHOTO)
- Azerbaijani delegation to observe Kyrgyz parliamentary elections
- Program of Azerbaijani Parliament chairman’s visit to Italy announced
- Azerbaijani MPs postively [sic] appraise presidential elections in Ukraine
- Members of the Azerbaijani parliament will make assessment of the presidential elections in Ukraine on Monday
- Ban of Smoking in Public Places May Reduce Cigarettes Sales by One-Third: Head of European Tobacco Baku
- Chairmanship in GUAM Parliamentary Assembly Transferred to Azerbaijan
- Results of exit poll held by PA Government Services
- Results of parliamentary elections in Azerbaijan on 11.00 a.m.
- Parlament seçkilərinin ilkin nəticələri (SİYAHI) (YENİLƏNİB)
- ABŞ-ın "AJF & Associates" şirkəti "exit-poll"un nəticələrini açıqladı (FOTO, SİYAHI) (ƏLAVƏ OLUNUB)
- ELS "exit-poll"un nəticələrini açıqladı (ƏLAVƏ OLUNUB) (SİYAHI)
- Azərbaycanda sahibkarlıq sahəsində yoxlamaları yalnız Baş Prokurorluq aparacaq
- Azərbaycan nümayəndə heyəti Belarusda prezident seçkilərini müşahidə edəcək
- Azərbaycanda 2016-cı ildə büdcə kəsirinin azalmasının 2 şərti
- Azərbaycanda dolların məzənnəsinin sabitləşəcəyi gözlənilmir
- Rüfət Quliyev: Avropa gələcəkdə Azərbaycanla münasibətlərdən daha çox fayda qazanacaq
- Deputat: Azərbaycan 5-7 ildən sonra neftdən asılı olmayacaq
- Moskvada Rusiya-Azərbaycan parlamentlərarası komissiyasının 13-cü iclası keçiriləcək
- Azərbaycan banklarını nə gözləyir?
- Millət vəkili: Azərbaycanda əhalinin kredit üzrə biliyini artırmaq lazımdır
- Oqtay Əsədovun rəhbərlik etdiyi nümayəndə heyəti Sankt-Peterburqa gedir
- Ukraynalı deputat: "Azərbaycandan çox şey öyrənmək əzmindəyik"
- Parlamentdə tələb: Azərbaycan telekanallarında çal-çağır, şou-biznes verilişləri bağlansın
- Azərbaycanda xarici siqaretlər bahalaşacaq
- Azərbaycanda siqaretin qiyməti ilə bağlı açıqlama
- "Rublun dəyərdən düşməsi Azərbaycanın Rusiya ilə ticarətini çətinləşdirir"
- MDB PA-da yollarda təhlükəsizlik məsələləri müzakirə ediləcək
- Azərbaycanda siqaretin bahalaşacağı gözlənilir
- Millət vəkili: MDB iqtisadi məkanı Azərbaycan üçün əsas yerdir
- Rüfət Quliyev: Yaxın 5-7 ildə Azərbaycan neft-qaz asılılığından tam xilas olacaq
- Qazaxıstanda parlamentin Yuxarı Palatasına seçkilər keçirilir
- Azərbaycanın millət vəkilləri Qazaxıstanda parlament seçkilərini izləyəcəklər
- Azərbaycan deputatları Ukraynada keçiriləcək parlament seçkilərini müşahidə edəcəklər
- Moskvada Rusiya-Azərbaycan parlamentlərarası komissiyasının 11-ci iclası keçiriləcək
- Milli qəhrəmanlara və onların ailə üzvlərinə yeni güzəştlər təklif olunur
- İtaliya-Azərbaycan münasibətləri müzakirə olunacaq
- Oqtay Əsədov MDB PA-nın iclasında iştirak edəcək
- Azərbaycan Parlamenti sədrinin başçılıq etdiyi nümayəndə heyəti Almatıya yola düşüb
- Milli Məclisin sədri MDB PA-nın 20 illik yubileyinə həsr olunmuş tədbirlərdə iştirak edəcək
- Azərbaycan deputatları Rusiyada keçiriləcək prezident seçkilərini müşahidə edəcəklər
- Azərbaycan deputatları Qazaxıstanda keçiriləcək parlament seçkilərini müşahidə edəcəklər
- Azərbaycan və Ukrayna gənclərinin birgə layihələr həyata keçirmələri müzakirə olunub (FOTO)
- Azərbaycan Parlamentinin deputatları Rusiya Dövlət Dumasına keçiriləcək seçkilərı müşahidə edəcəklər
- Spiker Oqtay Əsədovun rəhbərlik etdiyi nümayəndə heyəti MDB Parlamentlərarası Assambleya Şurasının iclasında iştirak edəcək
- Azərbaycan Parlamentinin sədri MDB PA-nın iclasında iştirak edəcək (ƏLAVƏ OLUNUB)
- Azərbaycan Parlamentinin komitələrinin tərkibi müəyyən olunub
- Azərbaycanda keçirilən parlament seçkisində "exit-poll"un nəticələri açıqlanıb (TAM SİYAHI ƏLAVƏ OLUNUB) (FOTO)
- Azərbaycan nümayəndə heyəti Qırğızıstanda Parlament seçkilərini müşahidə edəcək
- İyunun 3-də Milli Məclis sədrinin başçılıq etdiyi nümayəndə heyəti Rusiyaya rəsmi səfər edəcək
- Azərbaycan Parlamenti sədrinin İtaliyaya rəsmi səfəri başa çatıb
- Ukraynada "Qarabağ tarixin gərdişində" sənədli filminin təqdimatı olub (FOTO)
- Azərbaycan Parlamentinin deputatları Ukraynada prezident seçkiləri ilə bağlı təkrar səsvermə prosesini də müşahidə edəcəklər
- Azərbaycan Parlamenti deputatlarının Ukraynada keçirilən prezident seçkiləri ilə bağlı ilkin rəyi müsbət olub
- "European Tobacco Baku"nun rəhbəri: "İctimai yerlərdə siqaret çəkilməsinə qadağa qoyulması satışı 1/3 qədər azalda bilər"
- GUAM Parlament Assambleyasına sədrlik Azərbaycan tərəfinə verilib
- Amerikanın PA Government Services şirkətinin keçirdiyi exit poll –un yekunları açıqlanıb - cədvəl
- Seçkilərin nəticələri açıqlanıb
- Азербайджану нужна система контроля над выдачей кредитов
- Азербайджан повышает эффективность госуправления
- Малому бизнесу в Азербайджане будет предложена альтернатива льготным кредитам
- Инвестпривлекательность Азербайджана заключается в стабильной политической системе - депутат
- Выход Великобритании из ЕС не окажет глобального влияния на Азербайджан - эксперт
- Ukraynada yaşayan azərbaycanlıların vəziyyəti müzakirə edilib
- "Дорожная карта" позволит обеспечить равномерное и динамичное развитие экономики Азербайджана - депутат
- Азербайджан в 2016 г. смог сохранить макроэкономические показатели в планируемых рамках - депутат
- Инициированные Азербайджаном проекты превратят страну в газовую державу - эксперт

Европа приобрела в лице Азербайджана надежного партнера - эксперт
