= Zahra Shahtakhtinskaya =

- Born: 17 November 1895; Khankendi, Russian Empire
- Died: 16 September 1977 (aged 81); Baku, Azerbaijani SSR
- Scientific career
- Fields: Zoology, Helminthology
- Institutions: Azerbaijan State Pedagogical University

Zahra Shahtakhtinskaya (17 November 1895, Khankendi, Russian Empire – 16 September 1977, Baku, Azerbaijan SSR) was an Azerbaijani Soviet zoologist, helminthologist. Doctor of Biological Sciences (1953), professor (1954), and a Honored Worker of Science of the Azerbaijan SSR (1960).

== Life ==
Zahra Shahtakhtinskaya was born in 1895 in Khankendi. She began her career in 1916 as a teacher at a women's gymnasium. From 1922, until the end of her life she worked at the Azerbaijan State Pedagogical University. At first she was the dean of the biological faculty, and since 1937 she was the head of the department of zoology. Her research was mainly aimed at the study of parasitic worms of water and marsh birds of Azerbaijan. Shakhtakhtinskaya is the author of scientific papers and textbooks, she trained a lot of scientific personnels. She was awarded the Order of Lenin and medals.

She died in Baku in 1977.

== Scientific works ==
- Invertebrate zoology (1960)
- Fundamentals of nature-study (1975)
- Zoology (1974)

== Awards ==
- Order of Lenin

== Family ==
Her husband Nemat Shakhtakhtinsky studied in St. Petersburg and worked for a long time at the Azerbaijan State Oil and Industry University. Their children, Togrul Shakhtakhtinsky was also a scientist and did research in the field of petrochemistry.

Zahra was a descendant of the Agayevs, one of the most famous noble families in Azerbaijan. She was a relative of Faraj bey Aghayev.

== See also ==
- Fatma Suleymanova
