= Manafov =

Manafov is a surname. Notable people with the surname include:

- Asya Manafova (born 1941), Azerbaijani politician
- Fakhraddin Manafov (born 1955), Soviet Azerbaijani actor
- Marat Manafov, Azerbaijani businessman and missing person
- Ravil Manafov (born 1988), Kazakhstani water polo player
- Vladyslav Manafov (born 1993), Ukrainian tennis player
