= 1988 violence in Shusha and Stepanakert =

Expulsion of Armenians from Shusha and Azerbaijanis from Stepanakert

- Part of the Nagorno-Karabakh conflict
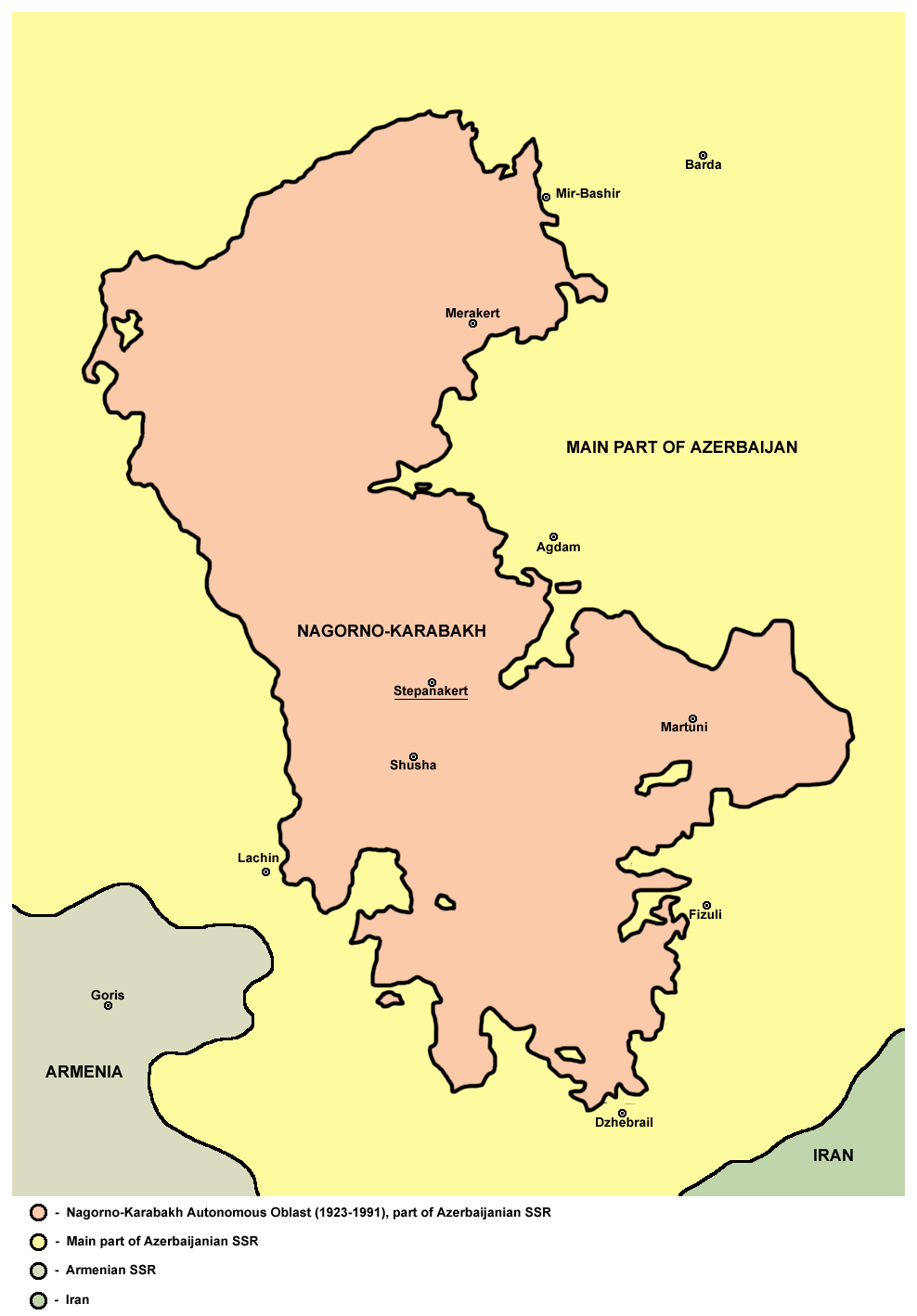
- Map of the Nagorno-Karabakh Autonomous Oblast
- Location: Shusha and Stepanakert, Nagorno-Karabakh Autonomous Oblast, Azerbaijan SSR, Soviet Union
- Date: September 18–20, 1988 (2 days)
- Target: Armenian population of Shusha and Azerbaijani population of Stepanakert
- Attack type: Expulsion
- Deaths: 1
- Injuries: 49

The 1988 violence in Shusha and Stepanakert was the expulsion of the ethnic Armenian population of Shusha and the ethnic Azerbaijani population of Stepanakert, in the Nagorno-Karabakh Autonomous Oblast in the Azerbaijani SSR, Soviet Union, from September 18 to 20, 1988. During the violence, 33 Armenians and 16 Azerbaijanis were wounded, more than 30 houses had been set on fire, and a 61-year-old Armenian was killed. At the end of the violence, 3,117 ethnic Azerbaijanis were forced to leave Stepanakert.

The events was one of the acts of ethnic violence in the context of the Nagorno-Karabakh conflict, carried out along the demands of the Armenians in Nagorno-Karabakh to secede from Azerbaijan and unify with Armenia.

== Background ==
Throughout modern history the city of Shusha, known to Armenians as Shushi, mainly fostered a mixed Armenian–Azerbaijani population. Following the Shusha massacre in 1920, the Armenian population of the city was mostly killed or expelled, and the city reduced to a town with a dominant Azerbaijani population.

Stepanakert, located in the Karabakh Plateau, was the capital of the Nagorno-Karabakh Autonomous Oblast (NKAO), with an Armenian majority, and an Azerbaijani minority. According to the 1979 Soviet census, the city had a population of 38,980 people, mostly of Armenians, who constituted 87% of the total population, and more than four thousand Azerbaijanis.

On March 1, Armenian refugees from Sumgayit arrived in Stepanakert, following the Sumgait pogrom. During the Summer-autumn of 1988 the wave of mutual violence in the NKAO grows. On September 18, 1988, a clash between Armenians and Azerbaijanis occurred near the Azerbaijani village of Khojaly (NKAO); several Armenians received gunshot wounds, one Armenian was killed. According to Thomas de Waal, "the violence heralded disaster for the minority communities of Karabakh's two main towns, as all the Armenians were driven from Shusha and the Azerbaijanis were expelled from Stepanakert". The exchange of populations took place as a result of clashes in Khojaly. In Stepanakert Armenians burned Azerbaijani houses, while in Shusha Azerbaijanis burned Armenian houses.

Since May 1988 this was the first anti-Armenian violence in Shusha. Armenian population of Shusha were subjected to tension. A crowd of 600 people threatened to burn down houses of Armenians, destroyed their property.

The expulsion of Azerbaijanis in Stepanakert also began on September 18, 1988, with 3,117 ethnic Azerbaijanis becoming refugees at the end of the month. The violence was accompanied by beatings and arson of houses. On September 21, the Soviet troops stationed in the city imposed a curfew to preserve the situation.
