= Shahin Bayramov =

- Şahin Vaqif oğlu Bayramov
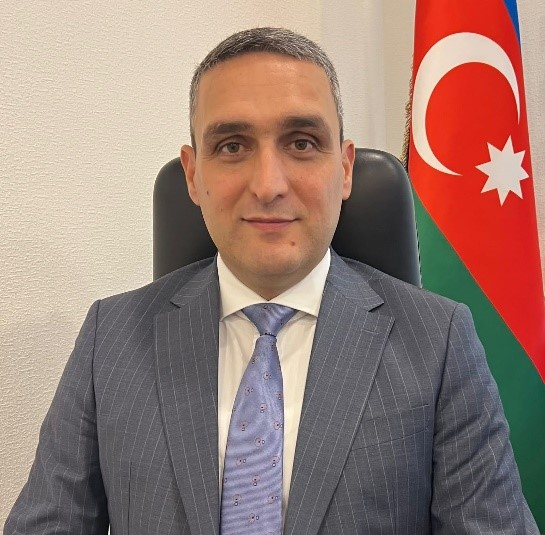

Rector of Karabakh University
- Incumbent
- Assumed office 20 May 2024

Rector of Mingachevir State University
- In office 31 July 2019 – 20 May 2024

Personal details
- Born: 4 July 1979 (age 47) Mingachevir, Azerbaijan SSR, Soviet Union
- Education: Azerbaijan State University of Economics
- Occupation: Economist, academic administrator

Shahin Vagif oghlu Bayramov (Azerbaijani: Şahin Vaqif oğlu Bayramov; 4 July 1979, Mingachevir, Azerbaijan SSR) is an Azerbaijani economist and academic administrator who has served as the rector of Karabakh University since 20 May 2024. He previously served as rector of Mingachevir State University from 2019 to 2024.

== Early life and education ==
Shahin Bayramov was born on 4 July 1979 in Mingachevir, Azerbaijan SSR, Soviet Union.

In 2012, he defended his dissertation entitled Problems of the European Union's Neighbourhood Policy and the Integration of Azerbaijan into the European Economic Space and was awarded the degree of Doctor of Philosophy in Economics.

== Professional career ==
Bayramov worked at the Azerbaijan State University of Economics (UNEC), where he served as Vice-Rector for International Relations and Programs until April 2017.

On 17 April 2017, he was appointed Deputy Head of the Department of Science, Higher and Secondary Specialized Education of the Ministry of Education of Azerbaijan.

On 31 July 2019, Bayramov was appointed rector of Mingachevir State University by decree of the president of Azerbaijan.

He served as rector of Mingachevir State University until 20 May 2024, when he was dismissed from the position by presidential decree.

On the same day, 20 May 2024, Bayramov was appointed Rector of Karabakh University.

== International activities ==
In 2015–2016, Bayramov participated in the Hubert H. Humphrey Fellowship Program of the United States Department of State. He studied in the United States from 11 August 2015 to 10 June 2016 and completed the program successfully.

During this period, he participated in a number of academic and professional events, including the Advanced Executive Leadership Program in New York City in late 2015, the IUNC North America 2016 conference in Miami, and the 3rd Internationalization Symposium at Cornell University in May 2016.

== Rector of Karabakh University ==
On 20 May 2024, Shahin Bayramov was appointed the first rector of Karabakh University by the president of Azerbaijan.
