= Karabakh University =

University in Khankendi, Azerbaijan

- Qarabağ Universiteti
- Type: Public
- Established: 28 November 2023
- Rector: Shahin Bayramov
- Location: Stepanakert, Karabakh Economic Region, Azerbaijan; 39.82496°N 46.76205°E
- Colors
- Website: qu.edu.az

Karabakh University, officially styled as Qarabağ University (Azerbaijani: Qarabağ Universiteti), is a higher education institution established in 2023 under the Ministry of Science and Education of the Republic of Azerbaijan. It is located in the city of Stepanakert (officially referred to as Khankendi) in the Karabakh Economic Region of Azerbaijan.

Some of the university's initial facilities were housed in buildings previously used by Artsakh University, the principal institution of higher education in the city during the period of the breakaway Republic of Artsakh, before the expulsion of the Armenian population of Nagorno-Karabakh following the 2023 Azerbaijani offensive in Nagorno-Karabakh.

== History ==
In 1969, the Stepanakert branch of the Baku Pedagogical Institute was established in the Nagorno-Karabakh Autonomous Oblast, named after Lenin, with two departments, language and literature, and mathematics. Education was conducted in Armenian, Azerbaijani, and later in Russian. In 1973, it received independent status and was renamed the Stepanakert State Pedagogical Institute.

In September 2023, after the 2023 Azerbaijani offensive in Nagorno-Karabakh, the city came under the control of Azerbaijani forces. Following this, Ilham Aliyev issued a decree on 28 November 2023 to establish Karabakh University.

Later, on 6 February 2024, the Cabinet of Ministers of the Republic of Azerbaijan approved the Charter of Karabakh University.

On 15 February 2024, by the decree of Aliyev, 10 million manats were allocated for Karabakh University.

On 20 May 2024, Shahin Bayramov was appointed as the rector of the university.

On 20 September 2024, Karabakh University was officially opened following the renovation of its campus buildings. On the same day, a renovated student dormitory complex comprising five apartment-type buildings was inaugurated.

On 7 February 2025, President Ilham Aliyev signed a decree establishing the Qarabağ University Clinic as a public legal entity under the university. The decree also allocated 5 million manats for the clinic's operating expenses in 2025. On 14 September 2025, the newly established clinic building and the academic building of the Faculty of Medicine and Health Sciences were inaugurated.

On 23 December 2025, a newly constructed building for the Faculty of Business and Economics was inaugurated. On the same day, the foundation stone was laid for a new building for the Faculty of Engineering.

== Schools and programs ==
The university's academic structure includes 8 schools:

- School of Arts
- School of Business and Economics
- School of Education
- School of Engineering
- School of Humanities and Social Sciences
- School of Mathematics and Computer Sciences
- School of Medicine and Health Sciences
- School of Natural Sciences

The university also operates an International Language Center, which provides language instruction and academic support.

== Academics ==
Beginning with the 2026–2027 academic year, Karabakh University is scheduled to offer a dual degree program with Istanbul Technical University in four engineering fields, with graduates receiving degrees from both universities.

== See also ==
- List of universities in Azerbaijan
