= Stepanakert =

City in Nagorno-Karabakh, Azerbaijan

Stepanakert / Khankendi Ստեփանակերտ / Xankəndi
- City
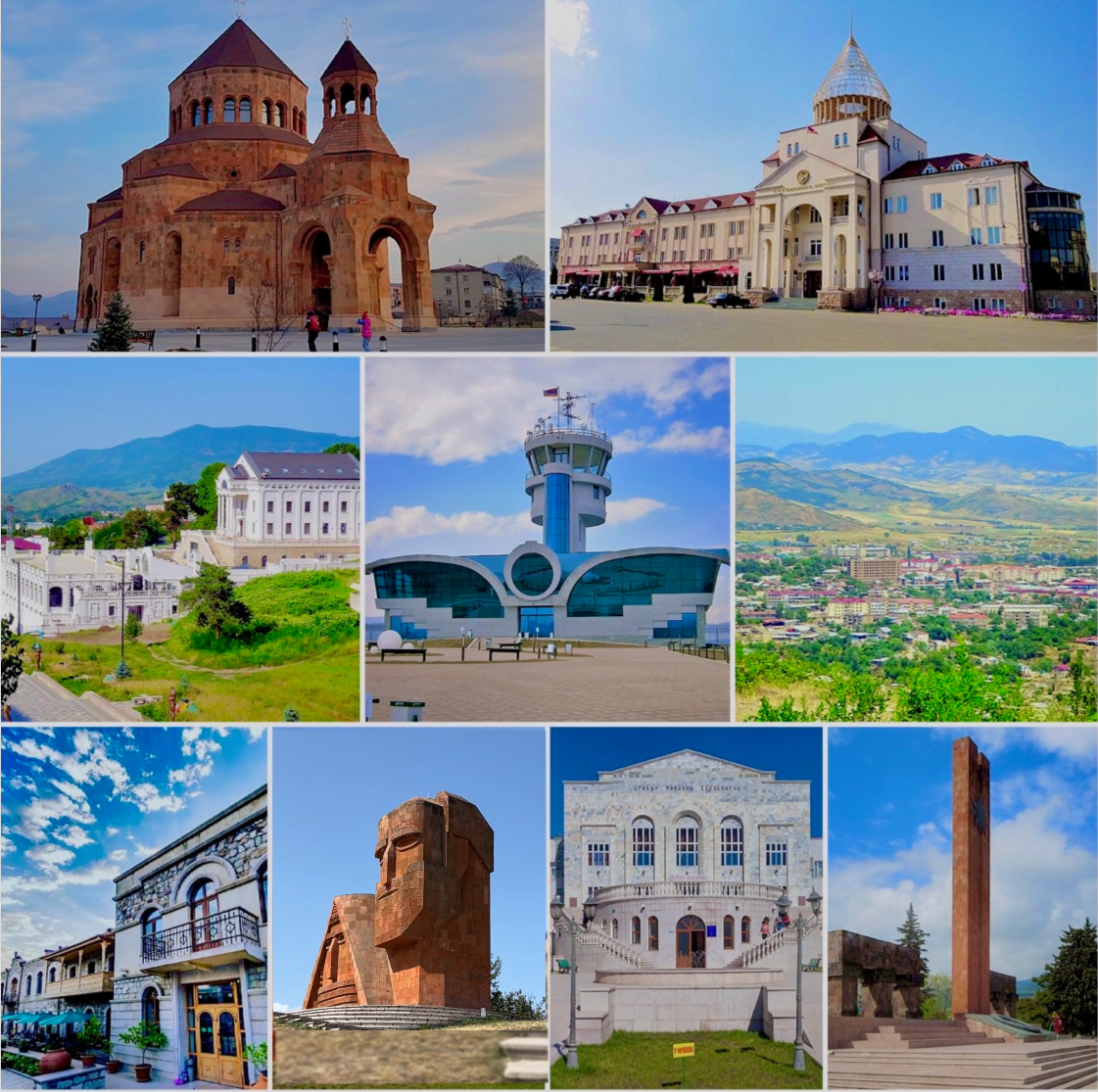
- From top left: Holy Mother of God Cathedral; Renaissance Square • Downtown Stepanakert; Stepanakert Airport • Stepanakert skyline Park Hotel Artsakh • We Are Our Mountains; Artsakh University • Stepanakert Memorial

- Location within Azerbaijan Location within Karabakh Economic Region
- Coordinates: 39°48′55″N 46°45′7″E
- Country: Azerbaijan
- Region: Karabakh
- City status: 1940

Government
  - President's special representative: Elchin Yusubov

Area
  - Total: 29.12 km^{2} (11.24 sq mi)
- Elevation: 813 m (2,667 ft)

Population (2026)
  - Total: 24,000
  - Density: 820/km^{2} (2,100/sq mi)
- Time zone: UTC+4 (GMT+4)
- Area code: +994 26
- Sources: Stepanakert city area

Stepanakert, (Note: Armenian: Ստեփանակերտ, romanized: Stepʻanakert, Eastern pronunciation: [stɛpʰɑnɑˈkɛɾt].) or Khankendi, (Note: Azerbaijani: Xankəndi, pronounced [xɑncænˈdi].) is a city in the Nagorno-Karabakh region of Azerbaijan. The city was under the control and the capital city of the breakaway Republic of Artsakh prior to the 2023 Azerbaijani offensive in the region. The city is located in a valley on the eastern slopes of the Karabakh mountain range, on the left bank of the Karkar/Gargarchay River.

The area that would become Stepanakert was originally an Armenian settlement named Vararakn. During the Soviet period, the city was made the capital of the Nagorno-Karabakh Autonomous Oblast, becoming a hub for economic and industrial activity. The city became a hotbed for political activity, serving as the center for Armenian demonstrations calling for the unification of Nagorno-Karabakh with Armenia. Stepanakert suffered extensive damage following the dissolution of the Soviet Union and the outbreak of the First Nagorno-Karabakh War and passed into the hands of local Armenians with the establishment of the Republic of Artsakh. During the Soviet and Artsakh periods, the city was a regional center of education and culture, being home to Artsakh University, musical schools, and a palace of culture. The economy was based on the service industry and had varied enterprises, food processing, wine making, and silk weaving being the most important. In 2021, the population of Stepanakert was 75,000 people, almost entirely Armenians.

In September 2023, Azerbaijan captured the Republic of Artsakh and expelled the Armenian population of Nagorno-Karabakh to Armenia, leaving Stepanakert as an empty ghost town. (Note: The city was described as a "ghost town" by several sources following the Azerbaijani takeover.) Azerbaijan began settling new residents in the city in September 2024 with the opening of Karabakh University, with the city having a population of 24,000 Azerbaijanis by 2026.

== Etymology ==
Medieval Armenian sources attest to a settlement in the locale called Vararakn (Armenian: Վարարակն, lit. 'rapid spring'). In 1847, the village was officially renamed from Vararakn to Khankendi by the Russian authorities; however, Vararakn remained the local Armenian name for the town until 1923.

Most Azerbaijani sources claim that the settlement was built in late 18th century, as a place of rest for the heads of the Karabakh Khanate. In the first years, it was known as "Khan's village" (Azerbaijani: Xanın kəndi) because only the khan's family and his relatives lived there. By the 19th century, the settlement was renamed Khankendi ("village of the khan" in Azerbaijani).

The town was renamed Stepanakert (lit. 'City of Stepan') on 20 September 1923, after Armenian Bolshevik revolutionary Stepan Shahumian. The name is formed from the words Stepan (Armenian: Ստեփան) and kert (Armenian: կերտ, lit. 'created').

== History ==
=== Founding and Soviet era ===
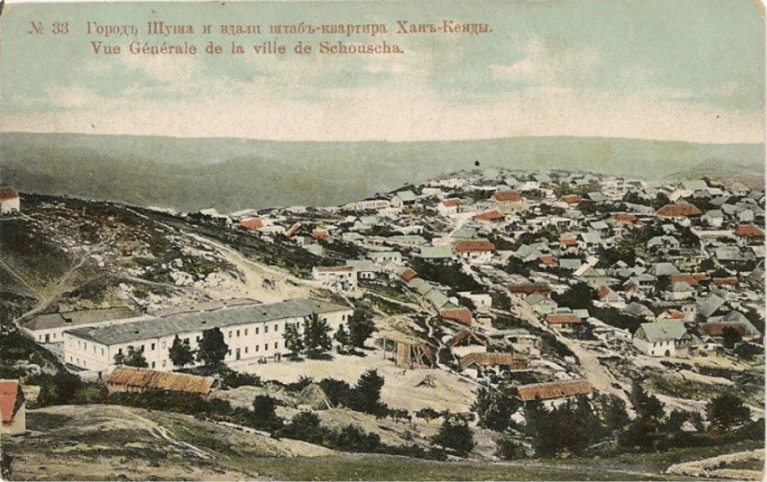
19th century Russian postcard of Shusha with the garrison of Khankendi in the distance.

According to medieval Armenian sources, the settlement was originally an Armenian village named Vararakn (Armenian: Վարարակն). From the 10th–16th centuries, the settlement was a part of the Armenian Principality of Khachen. Over the centuries, it would successively pass into the hands of the meliks of Karabakh and the Karabakh khans before coming under the control of the Russian Empire in 1822.

In the Russian Empire, the town was a part of the Shusha uezd of the Elizavetpol Governorate. According to the 19th-century author Raffi, in 1826, the local Armenian meliks met with the Persian crown prince Abbas Mirza, who had invaded Karabakh with his army, in the village to reconcile with the Persians and ensure the safety of the Karabakh Armenian population. In 1847, Vararakn was a village of about 132 houses, consisting of 80 Armenian households, 52 Russian households, an Armenian church, and a cemetery. That same year, the village was renamed from Vararakn to Khankendi. By 1886, there were 52 houses in the settlement. The population of Khankendi consisted of retired soldiers and their descendants, who belonged to the Russian Orthodox Church. The population was engaged in agriculture, as well as various crafts, carriage, the renting of apartments (mainly to military personnel), and so on. After 1898, the tsarist government turned Khankendi into a Russian military garrison. The garrison consisted of barracks, hospitals, and a church, as well as several houses where officers' families and a small local population, who supplied the military units with food, lived. The local population consisted of Armenians and Azerbaijanis.

In February 1920, after a body thought to be of an Azerbaijani soldier was found, an anti-Armenian riot took place in the village that claimed several hundred lives. Following the massacre of the Armenian population of Shusha in March 1920, the city received an influx of Armenians; as a result, Armenians formed the majority of the population from that time onwards. In the summer of 1920, the city was occupied by part of the Red Army. In 1923, Khankendi was renamed Stepanakert by the Soviet government in honor of Stepan Shahumian, a fallen Bolshevik party member and leader of the 26 Baku Commissars. The former regional capital was Shusha. However, following the depopulation of Armenians in Shusha, the capital of the Nagorno-Karabakh Autonomous Oblast (NKAO) was sited in Stepanakert. At the time of the formation of the NKAO, Stepanakert was a dilapidated settlement, where the number of surviving buildings barely reached 10 to 15. Some buildings were destroyed, others lacked doors and windows, and only walls remained in several. During the first years of the oblast, some of the buildings were restored. Many were rebuilt, roads were improved, and electricity and telephone communications were installed in the city. In time, Stepanakert grew to become the region's most important city (a status it received in 1940). Its population rose from 10,459 in 1939 to 33,000 in 1978.

In 1926, municipal authorities adopted a new city layout designed by Aleksandr Tamanian; two additional expansion plans were approved in the 1930s and 1960s, both of which retained Tamanian's initial plan. Several schools and two polyclinics were established, and an Armenian drama theater was founded in 1932 and named after Maxim Gorky. In 1960, the ensemble of the central square of Stepanakert was built with the building of the regional committee (now the NKR government). This square, then named after Lenin, became the arena of many rallies demanding the transfer of the NKAO to the Armenian SSR. By 1968, the first outbreak of ethnic violence occurred in Stepanakert. In the city, a trial was held over an Azerbaijani director of the city school who was accused of murdering an Armenian girl. The Armenians, who considered the verdict of the Azerbaijani judge too lenient, gathered outside the court building and burned the car which the criminal and judge were in.

Stepanakert served as Nagorno-Karabakh's main economic hub, and by the mid-1980s there were nineteen factories in operation in the city, including an electrical and asphalt plant. By the end of the Soviet era, Stepanakert had an agricultural technical school, a pedagogical institute, a medical and music school, a local history museum, and a drama theater.

=== First Nagorno-Karabakh War and Armenian control ===
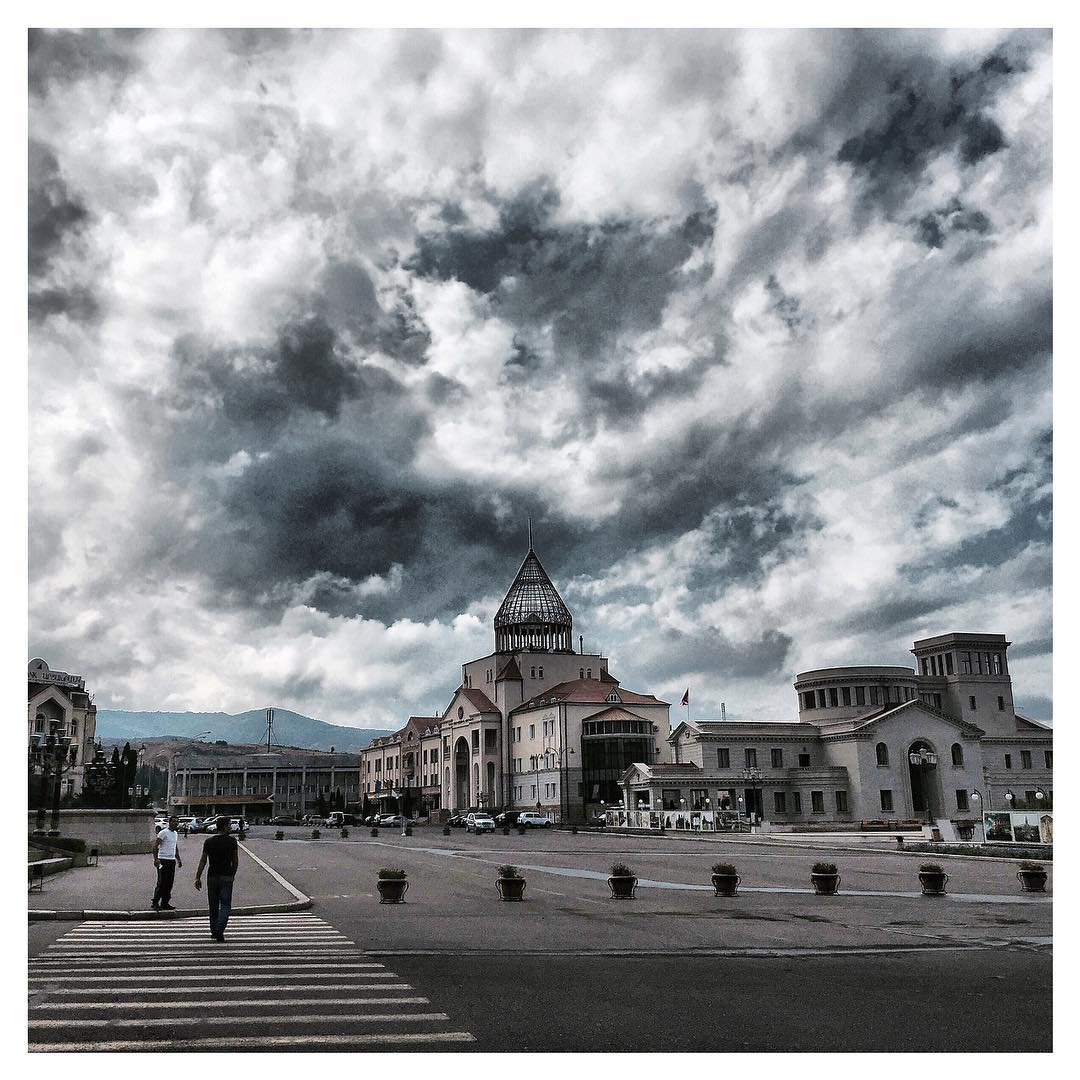
Renaissance Square (2016)

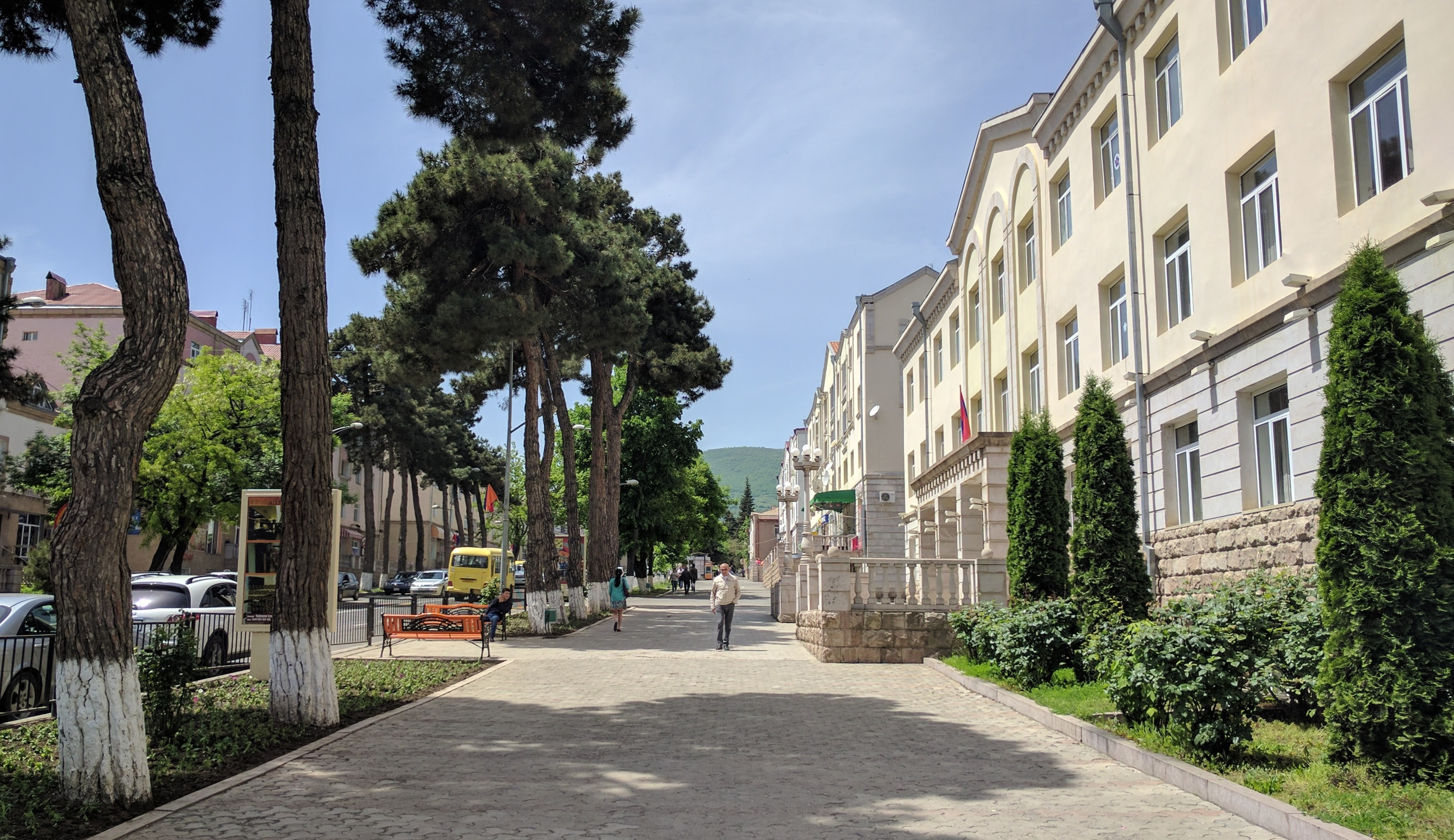
Freedom Fighters' Boulevard in central Stepanakert (2017)

The political and economic reforms that General Secretary Mikhail Gorbachev undertook in 1985 saw a marked decentralization of Soviet authority. Armenians, in both the Armenian SSR and Nagorno-Karabakh, viewed Gorbachev's reform program as an opportunity to unite the two together. On 20 February 1988, tens of thousands of Armenians gathered to demonstrate in Stepanakert's Lenin Square (now Renaissance Square) to demand that the region be joined to Armenia. On the same day, the Supreme Soviet of Nagorno-Karabakh voted to join the Armenian SSR, a move strongly opposed by the Soviet Azerbaijani authorities.

Relations between Stepanakert's Armenians and Azerbaijanis, who supported the Azerbaijani government's position, deteriorated in the following years. Inter-ethnic strife in the city in September 1988, encompassing physical attacks and burning of property, forced nearly all Azerbaijanis to flee the city. The Soviet Army took up positions in the city and announced a curfew three days later. In 1990 the army dispatched special forces units and various other elements to Stepanakert in order to prevent its takeover by Azerbaijani forces.

After Azerbaijan declared its independence from the Soviet Union in 1991, Stepanakert was renamed Khankendi by the Azerbaijani government. Fighting broke out over control of Nagorno-Karabakh, which, after three years of war, resulted in Armenian control of the region and a connecting corridor to Armenia to the west. Prior to the conflict, Stepanakert was the largest city of the NKAO, with a population of 70,000 out of a total 189,000 (Armenians at the time comprised 75% of the region's total population). By early 1992, that figure had dropped to 50,000.

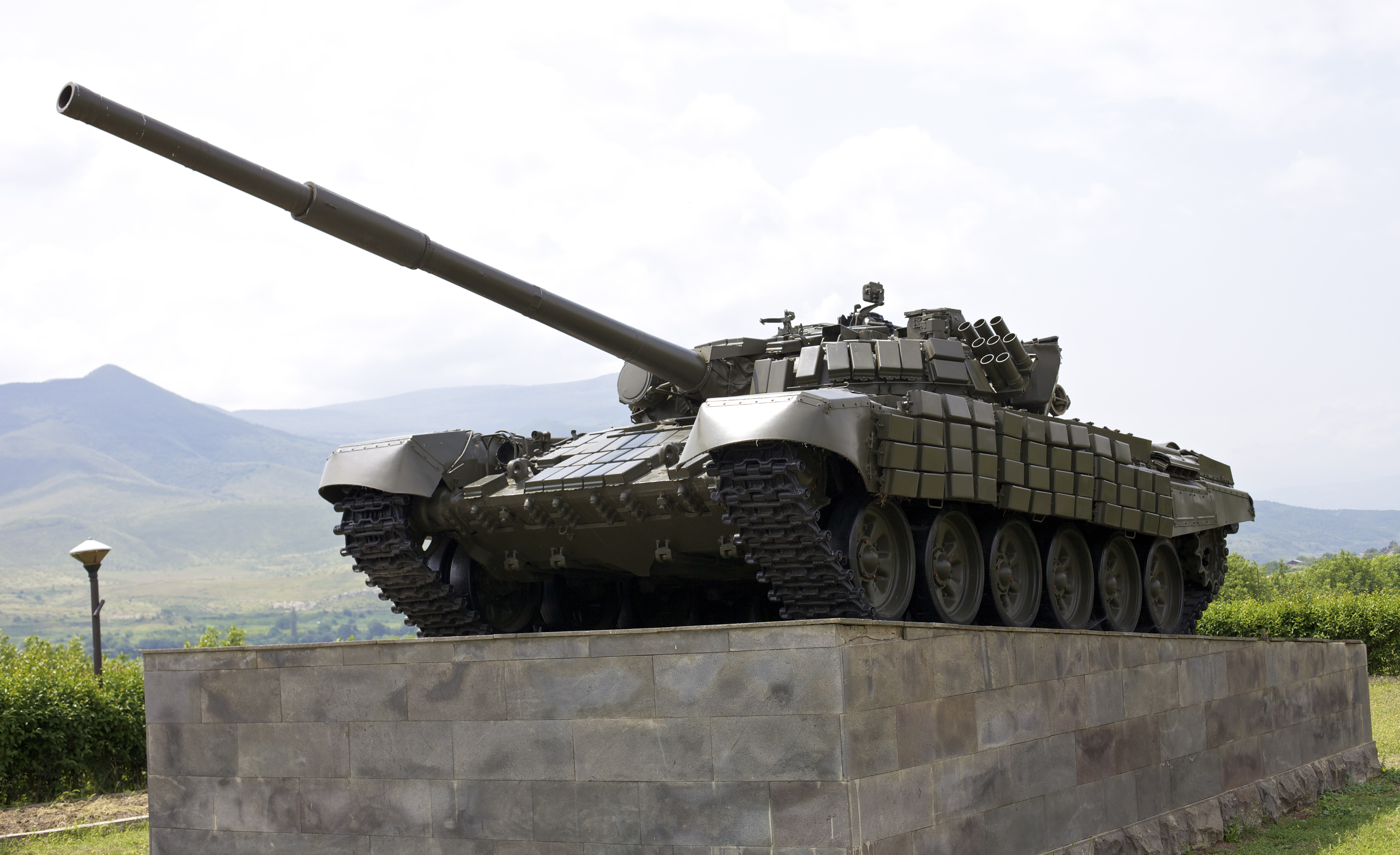
A T-72 tank memorial from the First Karabakh War.

During the war, the city suffered immense damage from Azerbaijani bombardment, especially in early 1992 when the Azerbaijanis positioned BM-21 Grad rocket artillery in Shusha and rained down missiles over Stepanakert. A journalist for Time noted in an April 1992 article that "scarcely a single building [had] escaped damage in Stepanakert." It was not until 9 May 1992, with the capture of Shusha, that the ground bombardment ceased. The city, nevertheless, continued to suffer aerial bombardment until the end of the war. As a result, the majority of the city was in a severely damaged state. As of 2016, the city had not been completely restored from the war.

The city came under intense bombardment once again during the Second Nagorno-Karabakh War in 2020. Residential areas were continuously hit by the Azerbaijani Army with cluster munitions throughout the war, starting on the first day of fighting, and residents were urged to use the city's bomb shelters. As Azerbaijani forces advanced on the city of Shusha, the Lachin corridor was shut down by Artsakh authorities.

With Azerbaijani forces 15 km (9.3 mi) from the capital, a ceasefire agreement was signed on 10 November. As part of the agreement, Russian peacekeepers were deployed to the region. Following the war, the population of Stepanakert swelled to 75,000 residents as a result of some 10,000 to 15,000 displaced people who lost their homes elsewhere in the Republic of Artsakh during the war.

=== Control by Azerbaijan ===
On 19–20 September 2023 Azerbaijan launched a new offensive in the region, which ended in a ceasefire and led to a mass exodus of ethnic Armenians a few days later. By 29 September 2023, police of the Ministry of Internal Affairs of Artsakh left all their weapons in Stepanakert and completely abandoned the region. Azerbaijani police vehicles began patrolling the area on 29 September and the Azerbaijani flag was placed on the city's We Are Our Mountains monument. From 1 October, Azerbaijani officials began working from the former Artsakh police headquarters, Azerbaijan took over responsibility for medical services in the city and its area was covered by the Azerbaijani mobile networks. An Al Jazeera news crew reported from the city later that day, showing deserted streets in what the reporter described as "A ghost town with no soul left". After the offensive and Armenian exodus, sources reported that Azerbaijani authorities issued a map of Stepanakert renaming one of the streets after Enver Pasha, one of the main perpetrators of the Armenian genocide. An Azerbaijani official disputed this during a case at the International Court of Justice, saying that "No streets in Khankandi have been renamed".

President Ilham Aliyev visited the city on 15 October and officially raised the flag of Azerbaijan at the building that was previously used as the Artsakh Presidential Palace.

In December 2023, the first football match since the resumption of Azerbaijani control was played between MOIK Baku and Qarabağ FK from Aghdam in the Azerbaijan Cup. In the following months, Azerbaijani authorities dismantled monuments symbolizing Artsakh, including the Giant Cross and the Eagle Monument, and statues of prominent Armenians in the city, among them, Stepan Shahumyan (after whom Stepanakert is named), Charles Aznavour and Alexander Myasnikyan.

In early March 2024, Azerbaijani authorities demolished the National Assembly of Artsakh Building and the Artsakh Freedom Fighters Union Building. In November 2024, reports emerged that Azerbaijan demolished the historical Armenian center of the city.

== Pre-2023 Stepanakert ==
=== Culture ===
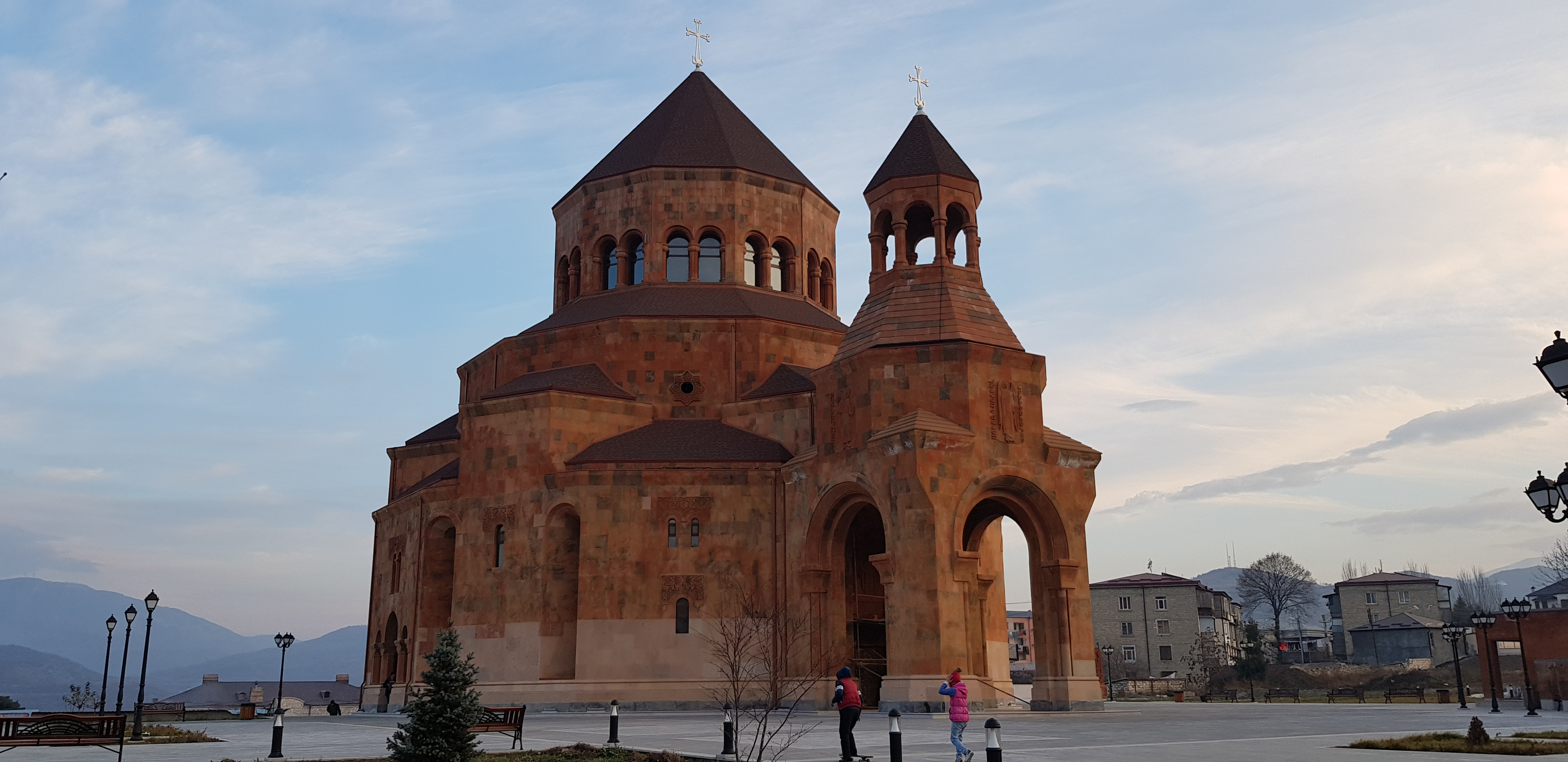
Cathedral of the Holy Mother of God (consecrated in 2019, demolished in 2026)

The Vahram Papazyan Drama Theater of Stepanakert was founded in 1932. In 1967, the monumental complex of Stepanakert known as We Are Our Mountains was erected to the north of Stepanakert, It is widely regarded as a symbol of the Armenian heritage of the historic Artsakh. After the independence of Armenia, many cultural and youth centres were reopened. The cultural palace of the city was named after Charles Aznavour.

Stepanakert was home to the Mesrop Mashtots Republican Library opened in 1924, Artsakh History Museum opened in 1939, Hovhannes Tumanyan Children's Library opened in 1947, Stepanakert National Gallery opened in 1982, and the Memorial Museum of the Martyred Liberators opened in 2002. A new cultural complex of the Armenian heritage of Artsakh was under construction.

The Artsakh State Museum, based in Stepanakert, had an important collection of ancient artifacts and Christian manuscripts.

==== Education ====
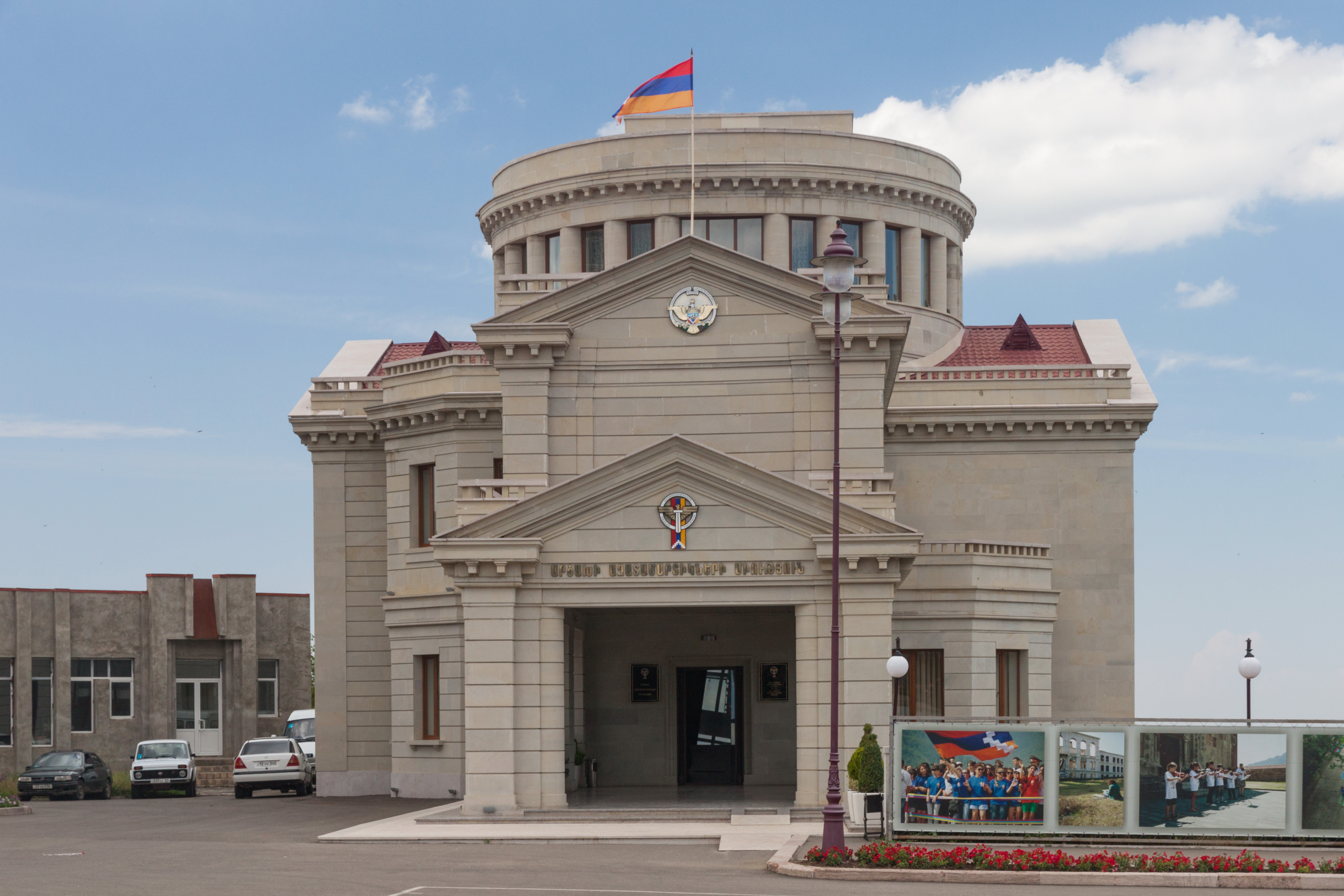
The Union of Artsakh Freedom Fighters (pictured 2014, demolished in 2024)

Stepanakert was the center of higher education in Artsakh. Five higher educational institutions operated in the city:

- Artsakh State University, founded in 1969 as a branch of the Baku Pedagogical Institute. In 1973, it was renamed Stepanakert Pedagogical Institute and following the independence of Nagorno-Karabakh, in 1992, it received its current status. The university offered courses spread across seven departments and has 4,500 students.
- Stepanakert campus of the Armenian National Agrarian University.
- Grigor Narekatsi University (private).
- Mesrop Mashtots University (private).
- Gyurjyan Institute for Applied Arts (private).

Many new schools in Stepanakert were opened from the late 1990s to 2010 with the help of the Armenian diaspora. Existing schools were also renovated with donations from the diaspora.

The Stepanakert branch of Tumo Center for Creative Technologies was opened in September 2015, as a result of continued cooperation between the Tumo Centre and the Armenian General Benevolent Union, with the support of mobile operator Karabakh Telecom.

==== Sport ====
Football was a popular sport in Nagorno-Karabakh and the city has a renovated football stadium. Since the mid-1990s, football teams from Karabakh started taking part in some domestic competitions in Armenia. Lernayin Artsakh is the football club that represents the city of Stepanakert. The Artsakh national football league was launched in 2009.

The non-FIFA affiliated Artsakh national football team was formed in 2012 and played their first competitive match against the unrecognized Abkhazia national football team in Sukhumi on 17 September 2012. The match ended with a 1–1 draw. The following month, on 21 October 2012, Artsakh played the return match at the Stepanakert Republican Stadium against Abkhazia, winning it with a result of 3–0.

There was also interest in other sports, including basketball and volleyball.

Artsakh athletes also took part with the representing teams and athletes in the Pan-Armenian Games, organized in Armenia.

As an unrecognized entity, the athletes of Artsakh competed in international sports competitions under the flag of Armenia.

==== Twin towns – sister cities ====
Stepanakert was twinned with:

- Montebello, United States: On 25 September 2005, Montebello, California and Stepanakert became sister cities. This prompted a complaint by the ambassador of Azerbaijan to the United States, Hafiz Pashayev, who sent a letter to California leaders, stating that the decision jeopardized peace talks between his country and Armenia. The letter was sent to then-California governor Arnold Schwarzenegger, who deferred the letter to Montebello mayor Bill Molinari since it concerned a local, not a state, issue. Molinari responded to Pashayev that the city would go ahead with its plans to inaugurate Stepanakert under the sister city program. Stepanakert's relationship with Montebello is aimed at revitalizing the capital's economic infrastructure and building cultural and educational ties, as well as developing trade and health care between the two cities. Azerbaijan has described this as a contradictory foreign policy of the United States that supports the NKR government and Armenian aggression against Azerbaijan.
- Mairiporã, Brazil: Since 18 June 2018, Law 3767/18 has made Eternal Armenia the name that declares Sister Cities the Municipalities of Mairiporã, State of São Paulo, and Stepanakert, capital of the self-declared Nagorno-Karabakh Republic which triggered an alert from Itamaraty, Brazilian Ministry of Foreign Affairs, on the attitude of the Municipality as Brazil does not recognize the independence of Nagorno-Karabakh.

==== Friendship declarations ====
- On 22 May 1998, Stepanakert and the commune of Villeurbanne in France signed a Friendship Declaration.
- On 28 September 2012, Stepanakert and Yerevan, Armenia, the capitals of the two Armenian republics, became friends after signing a partnership agreement.
- On 15 September 2014, San Sebastián, Spain, and Stepanakert signed a cooperation agreement.
- On 17 May 2015, Stepanakert and the commune of Valence in France signed a Friendship Declaration.
- On 3 February 2016, Stepanakert signed a Friendship Declaration with the municipality of Franco da Rocha, Brazil.
- On 23 July 2019, Stepanakert signed a Friendship Declaration with the City of Ryde, Australia.

==== Religion ====
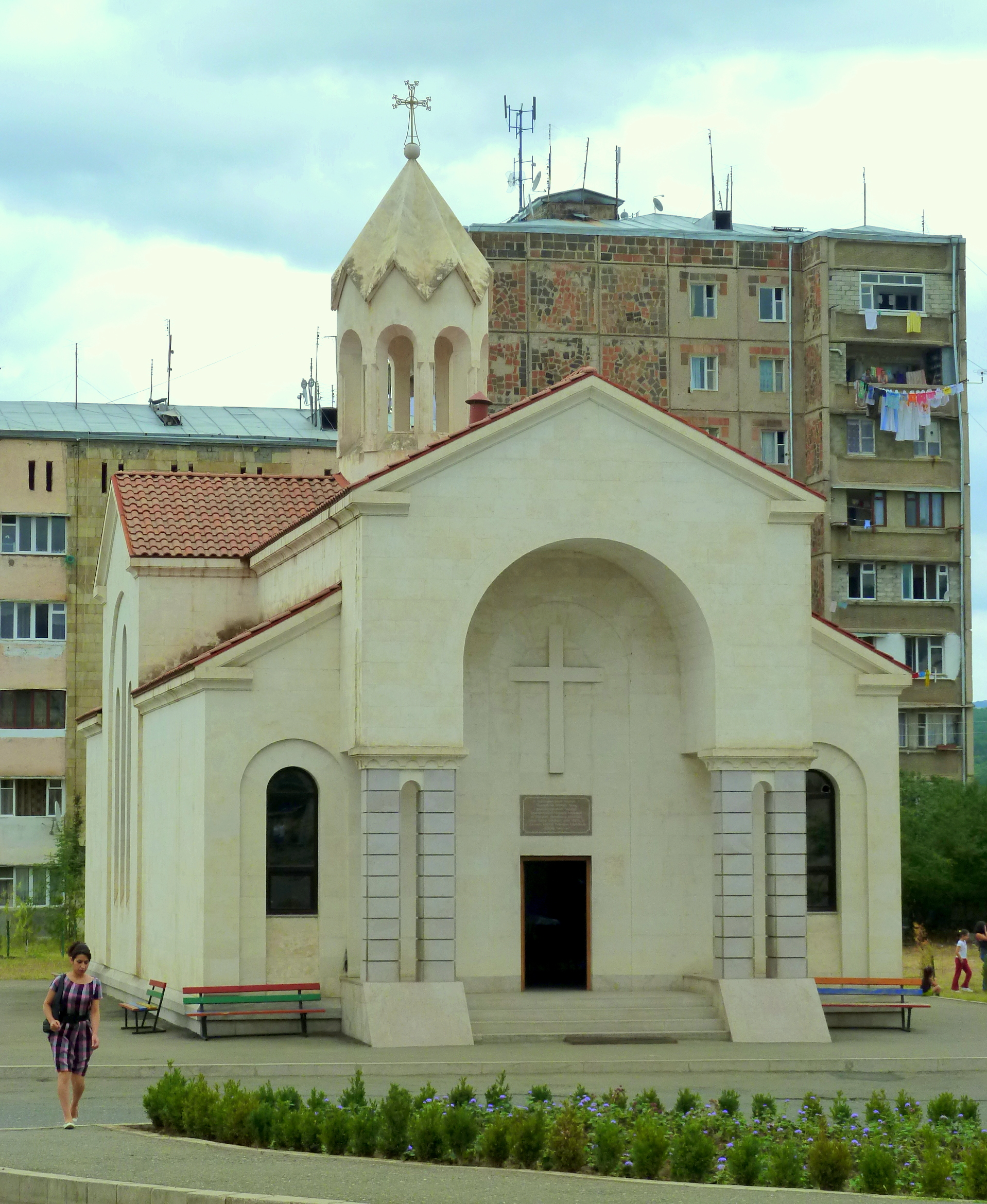
Saint James' Church (consecrated in 2007, demolished in 2026)

The late-19th-century church of Vararakn was destroyed in the 1930s to build the Stepanakert Drama Theatre. Throughout the rest of the Soviet era, there were no traditional churches in Stepanakert, although most of the population of the city were members of the Armenian Apostolic Church.

The church of Surp Hakob (or Saint James) was opened in 2007; it remained the only open church in the city until 2019. The church was financed by Nerses Yepremian from Los Angeles. The church was consecrated on 9 May 2007, in honor of the 15th anniversary of the capture of Shusha by Armenian forces.

The construction of the Holy Mother of God Cathedral was launched on 19 July 2006. The cost of the project was expected to be around US$2 million and the architect of the church is Gagik Yeranosyan. However, the construction process was slow due to a lack of financial resources. The inauguration of the church was expected to take place in September 2016. Construction finished and the church was opened in 2019.

There was small community of Armenian Evangelicals with around 500 members. The only Armenian evangelical church in Artsakh was located in Stepanakert. The Evangelical community supported many schools, hospitals and other institutions through the help of the Armenian Diaspora.

=== Economy ===
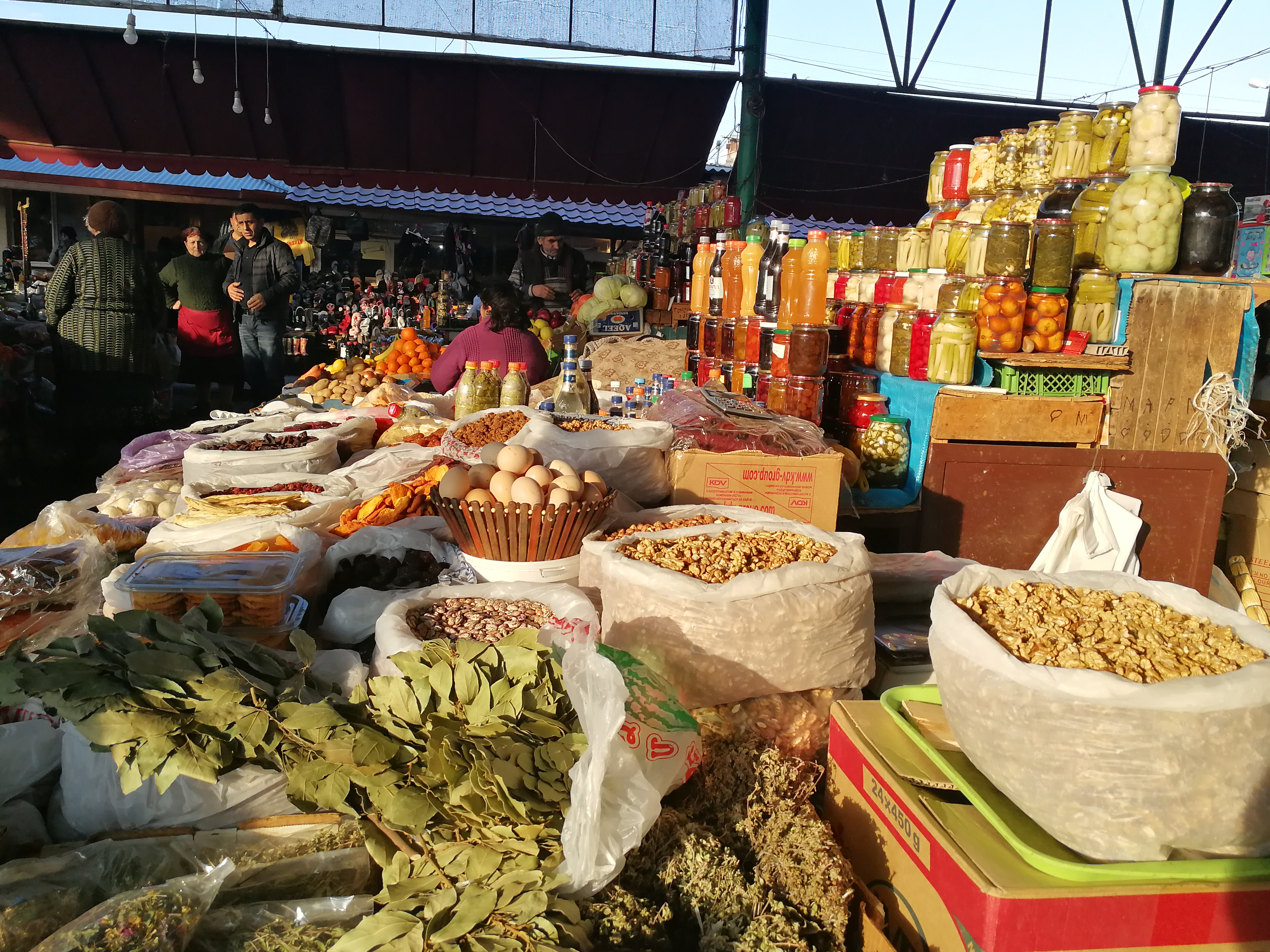
Stepanakert Bazaar (Shuka) (2020)

The city was a regional center of education and culture, being home to Artsakh University, musical schools, and a palace of culture. The economy was based on the service industry and has varied enterprises, food processing, wine making, and silk weaving being the most important. In 2021, the population of Stepanakert was 75,000.

Stepanakert was the center of the economy of Artsakh. Prior to the First Nagorno-Karabakh War, the economy of Stepanakert was mainly based on food-processing industries, silk weaving and winemaking. Inhabitants also engaged in producing furniture and footwear. The economy was severely damaged due to the 1988 earthquake in Armenia and the First Nagorno Karabakh war. In the years following, the economy was developed further, mainly due to investments from the Armenian diaspora. However, following the 2020 Nagorno-Karabakh war, the economy once again experienced severe damage, particularly in the tourism sector.

The most developed sectors of Stepanakert and the rest of the Republic of Artsakh were tourism and services. Several hotels were opened by diasporan Armenians from Russia, the United States and Australia. Artsakhbank was the largest banking services provider in Artsakh, while Karabakh Telecom was the leading provider of mobile telecommunications and other communication services.

Stepanakert was also home to many large industrial firms, including Stepanakert Brandy Factory, Artsakh Berry food products and Artsakh Footwear Factory.

Construction was also one of the leading sectors in the city. Artsakh Hek was the leading construction firm, while Base Metals was the leader in mining and production of building materials.

=== Politics and government ===
During the period of the USSR, Stepanakert served as the capital of the Nagorno-Karabakh Autonomous Oblast within the Azerbaijani Soviet Socialist Republic, between 1923 and 1991. With the self-declared independence of Artsakh in 1991, Stepanakert continued with its status as the political and cultural centre of the newly established republic, being home to all the national institutions: the Government House, the National Assembly, the Presidential Palace, the Constitutional Court, all ministries, judicial bodies and other government organizations.

Under the Republic of Artsakh, the city of Stepanakert was governed by the Stepanakert City Council and the mayor of Stepanakert. The last local elections took place in September 2019. The most recent mayor was Davit Sargsyan.

==== Government buildings ====
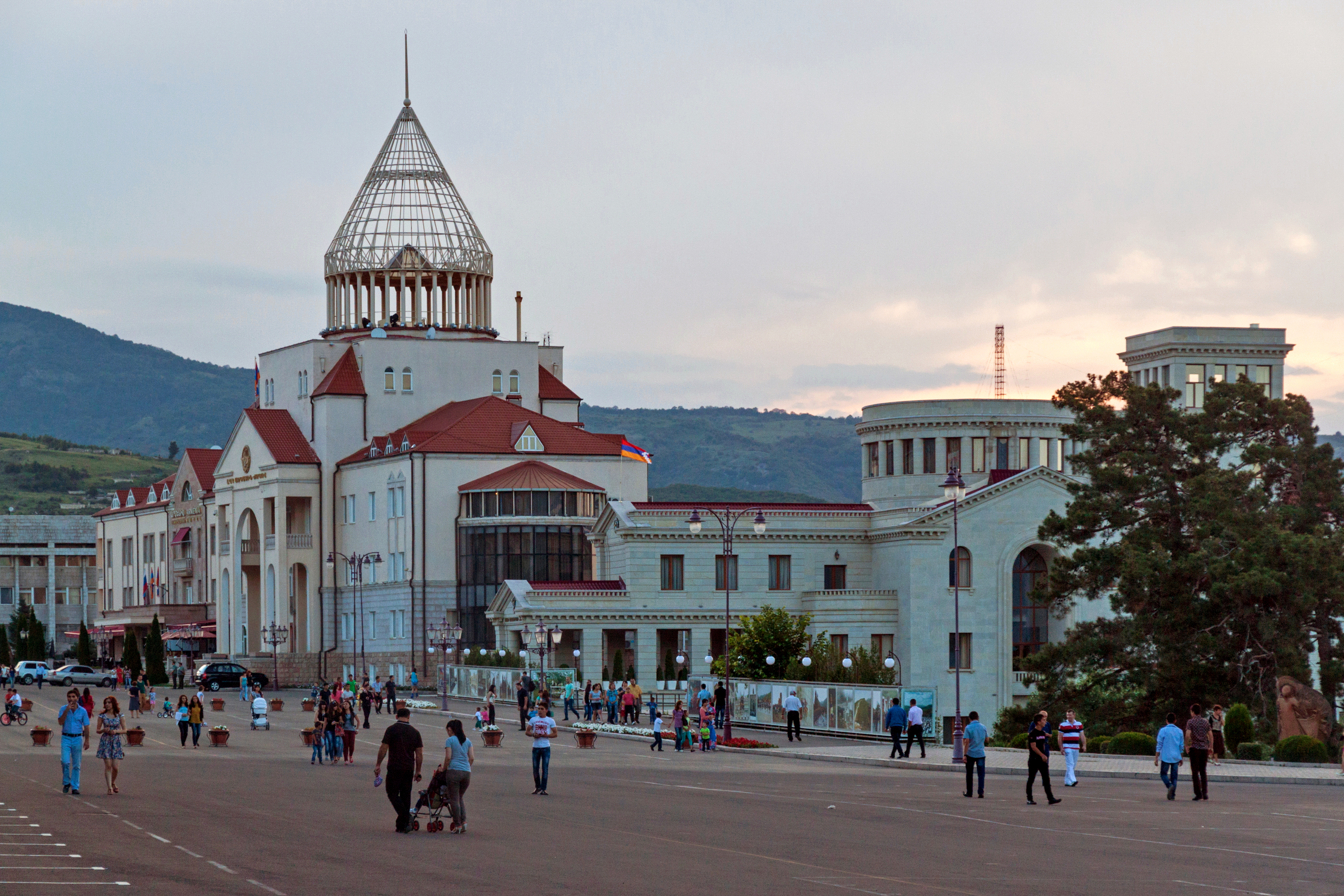
The National Assembly (demolished in 2024)

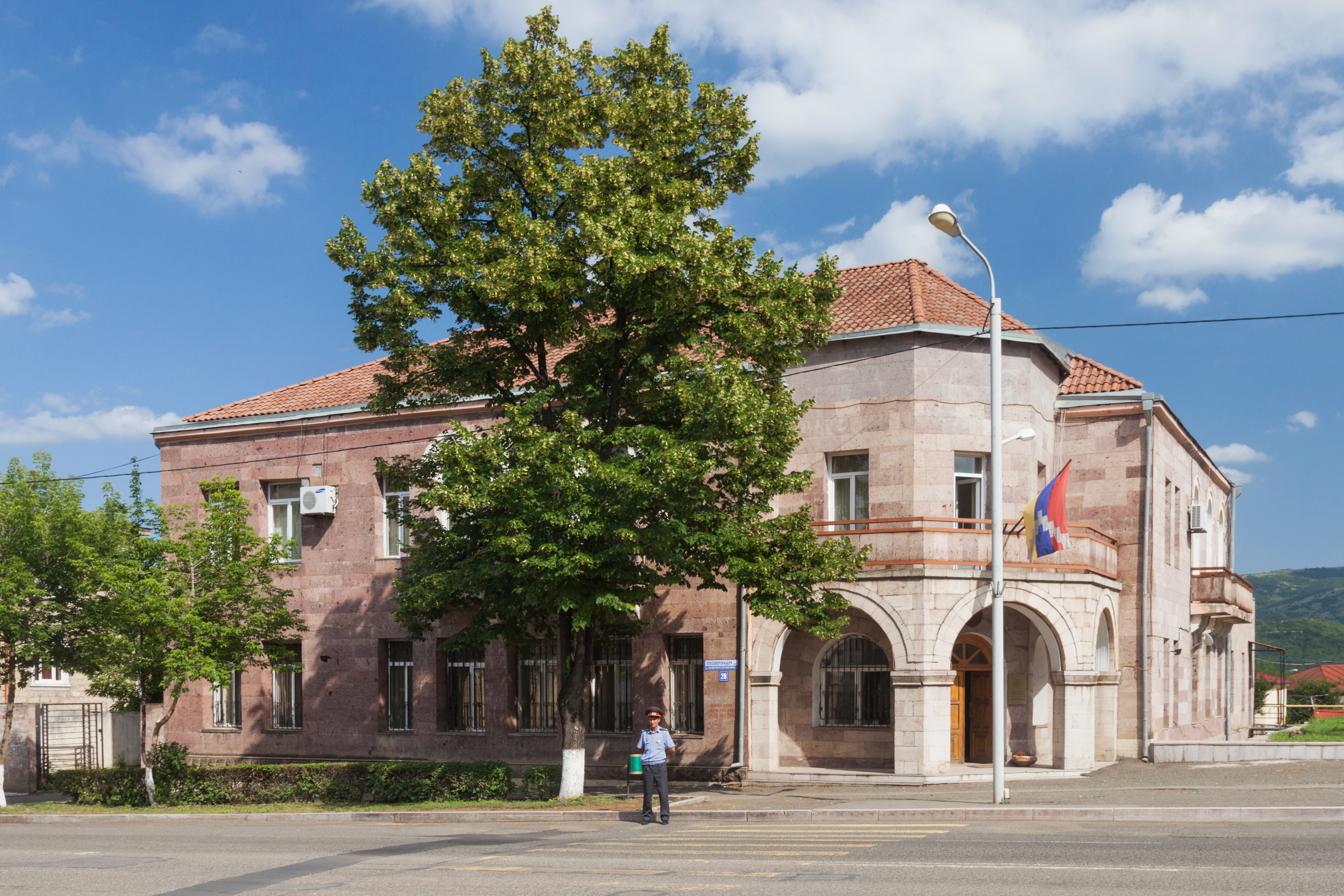
The Ministry of Foreign Affairs (demolished in 2025)

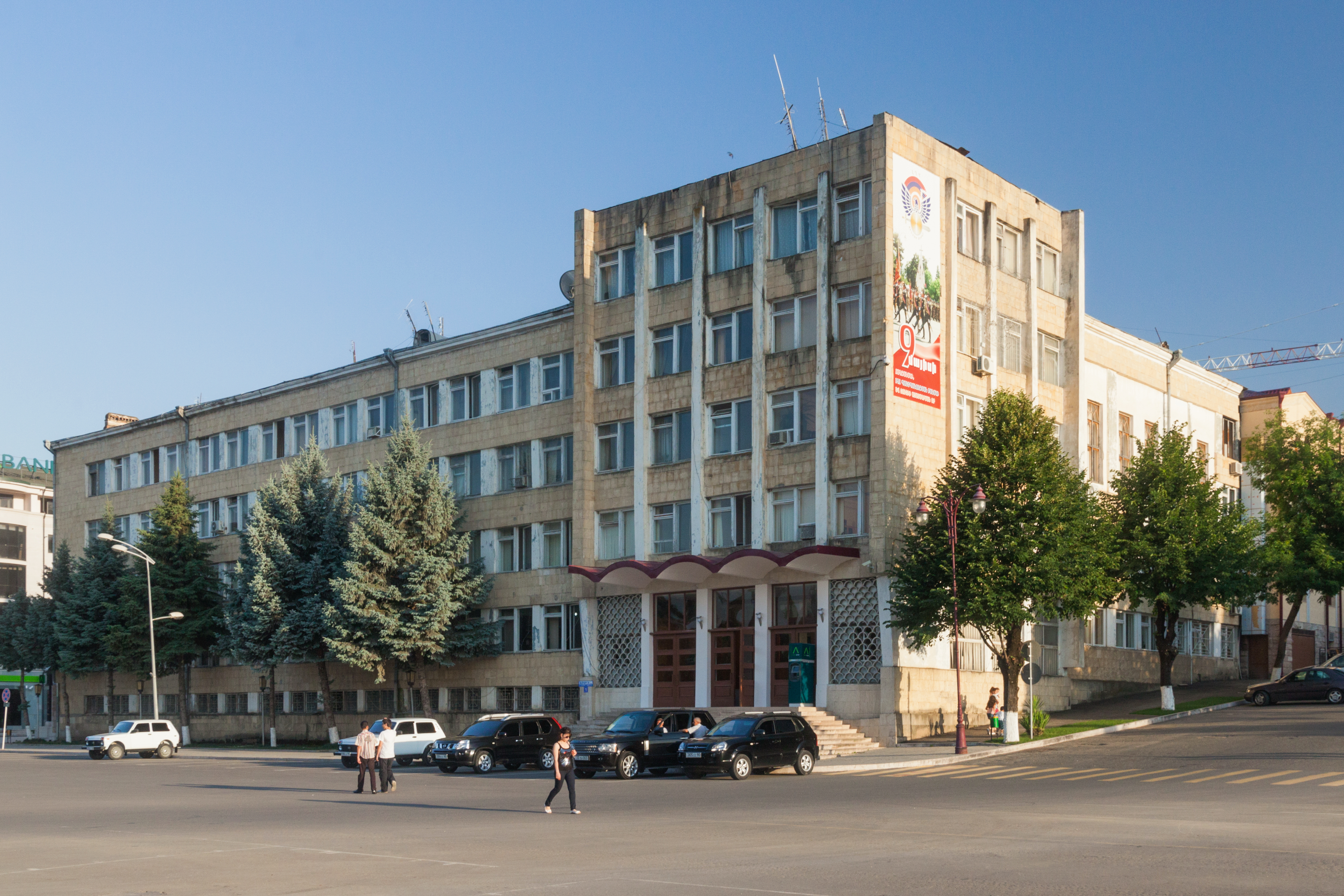
Government building, 20 February Street

== Post-2023 Khankendi ==
Since 2023, Azerbaijan has carried out widespread demolition of major buildings in the city and construction of new buildings.

=== Culture ===
==== Education ====
Karabakh University

Karabakh University opened in September 2024, with its students and staff becoming the first residents of the city since the expulsion of the city's ethnic Armenian population in 2023.

==== Sport ====
The Gashimov Memorial chess tournament was held in Khankendi for the first time in 2025, having previously been held elsewhere in Azerbaijan.

In 2026, the Tour d'Azerbaïdjan cycling race was renamed as the Baku-Khankendi Azerbaijan Cycling Race.

==== Twin towns – sister cities ====
Khankendi is twinned with:

- Baia Mare, Romania (since 2026)
- Urgench, Uzbekistan (since 2026)

==== Religion ====
The Holy Mother of God Cathedral and Saint James' Church were demolished in 2026 by Azerbaijan, which was described as cultural genocide by a former chair of the United States Commission on International Religious Freedom.

== Geography and climate ==
Stepanakert is located on the Karabakh plateau, at an average altitude of 813 m (2,667 ft) above sea level.

The city has a humid subtropical climate (Cfa) according to the Köppen climate classification system and an oceanic climate (Do) according to the Trewartha climate classification system. In the month of January, the average temperature drops to 1 °C (34 °F). In July, it averages around 23 °C (73 °F). Extreme temperatures ranged from −15.0 °C (5 °F) on 8 January 1974, to 37.0 °C (99 °F) on 11 July 1978.

Climate data for Stepanakert (1961–1990 normals, extremes 1959–1991)
Month	Jan	Feb	Mar	Apr	May	Jun	Jul	Aug	Sep	Oct	Nov	Dec	Year
Record high °C (°F)	16.1 (61.0)	19.0 (66.2)	22.8 (73.0)	30.3 (86.5)	30.0 (86.0)	37.0 (98.6)	37.0 (98.6)	36.0 (96.8)	31.0 (87.8)	25.0 (77.0)	21.2 (70.2)	21.0 (69.8)	37.0 (98.6)
Mean daily maximum °C (°F)	4.7 (40.5)	5.2 (41.4)	9.0 (48.2)	16.1 (61.0)	19.5 (67.1)	24.5 (76.1)	28.1 (82.6)	27.1 (80.8)	23.2 (73.8)	16.4 (61.5)	11.4 (52.5)	7.3 (45.1)	16.0 (60.9)
Daily mean °C (°F)	1.1 (34.0)	1.4 (34.5)	5.1 (41.2)	11.6 (52.9)	15.3 (59.5)	19.8 (67.6)	23.3 (73.9)	22.3 (72.1)	18.7 (65.7)	12.6 (54.7)	7.7 (45.9)	3.7 (38.7)	11.9 (53.4)
Mean daily minimum °C (°F)	−2.6 (27.3)	−2.5 (27.5)	1.1 (34.0)	7.0 (44.6)	11.0 (51.8)	15.1 (59.2)	18.4 (65.1)	17.4 (63.3)	14.2 (57.6)	8.7 (47.7)	4.0 (39.2)	0.1 (32.2)	7.7 (45.8)
Record low °C (°F)	−15.0 (5.0)	−11.0 (12.2)	−12.7 (9.1)	−1.0 (30.2)	4.0 (39.2)	6.6 (43.9)	11.3 (52.3)	10.9 (51.6)	6.0 (42.8)	−2.0 (28.4)	−6.0 (21.2)	−8.6 (16.5)	−15.0 (5.0)
Average precipitation mm (inches)	19 (0.7)	25 (1.0)	42 (1.7)	49 (1.9)	102 (4.0)	79 (3.1)	41 (1.6)	27 (1.1)	34 (1.3)	39 (1.5)	35 (1.4)	13 (0.5)	505 (19.9)
Average precipitation days	6	6	10	10	14	10	4	4	6	6	5	4	85
Source: NOAA

== Demographics ==
Year	Armenians		Azerbaijanis (Note: Mentioned as "Muslims" in the 1897 census and "Turks" in the 1926 census.)		Others		Total
Year	Number	%	Number	%	Number	%	Total
1897	628	42.0	442	29.6	425	28.4	1,495
1926	2,724	85.4	343	10.8	122	3.8	3,189
1939	9,079	86.8	672	6.4	708	6.8	10,459
1959	17,640	89.5	1,143	5.8	920	4.7	19,703
1970	26,684	88.1	2,762	9.1	847	2.8	30,293
1979	33,898	87.0	4,303	11.0	747	2.0	38,948
September 1988: First Nagorno-Karabakh War: Expulsion of Azerbaijani population
2005	49,848	99.7	2	0.0	136	0.3	49,986
2010	52,900						52,900
2015	55,309						55,309
September–November 2020:Second Nagorno-Karabakh War
2021	75,000						75,000
September 2023: Azerbaijani offensive in Nagorno-Karabakh
2024	c. 24		c. 8,000				c. 8,000
2025			c. 14,740				14,740
2026	0		24,000				24,000

According to the data of the Transcaucasian Statistical Committee, extracted from the family lists of 1886, there were 71 houses and 279 residents registered in Khankendi (recorded as Ханкенды, Khankendy in Russian), of which 276 were Russians, 2 Armenians and 1 Tatar (later known as Azerbaijani), who were respectively Orthodox, Armenian Gregorian and Sunni Muslim by religion. According to the Russian Empire Census of 1897, the village, labelled as Khan-kendy (Russian: Ханъ-кенды), had a population of 1,495 consisting of 801 men and 694 women; there were 628 Armenian Apostolics, 442 Muslims, and 394 Orthodox.

According to the 1910 publication of the Caucasian Calendar—a statistical almanac published by the office of the viceroy—there were 362 residents in the village of Khankendy of the Shusha uezd of the Elizavetpol Governorate in 1908, predominantly Russians. The 1912 publication of the Caucasian Calendar registered 1,076 residents, also predominantly Russians. According to the 1915 publication of the Caucasian Calendar, there were 1,550 predominantly Tatar residents in Khankendi. According to the Azerbaijani agricultural census of 1921, Khankendi had a population of 1,208 residents, mostly Armenians. In 1973, Stepanakert had a population of 32,000.

== Transport ==
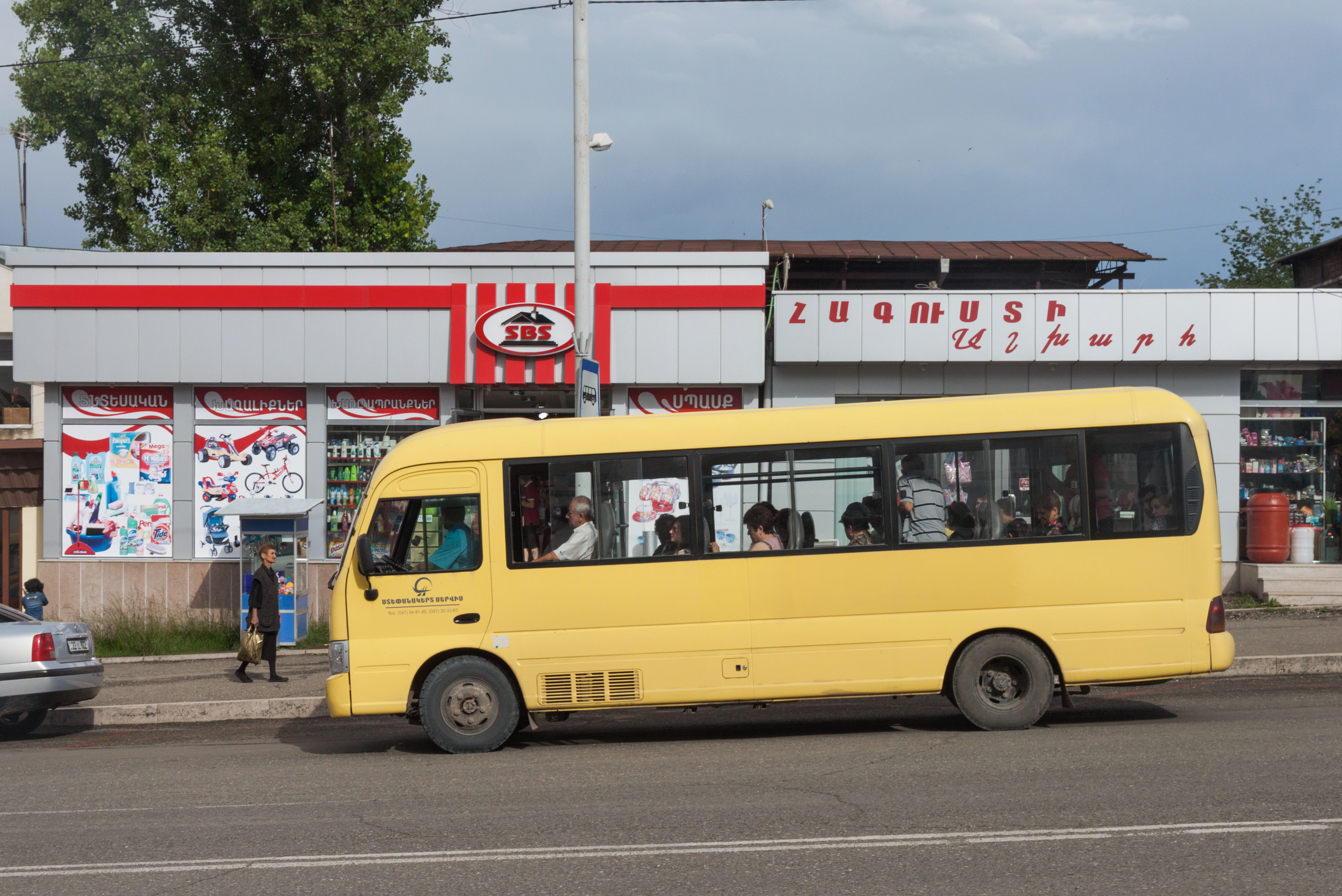
A routed taxicab minibus in Stepanakert

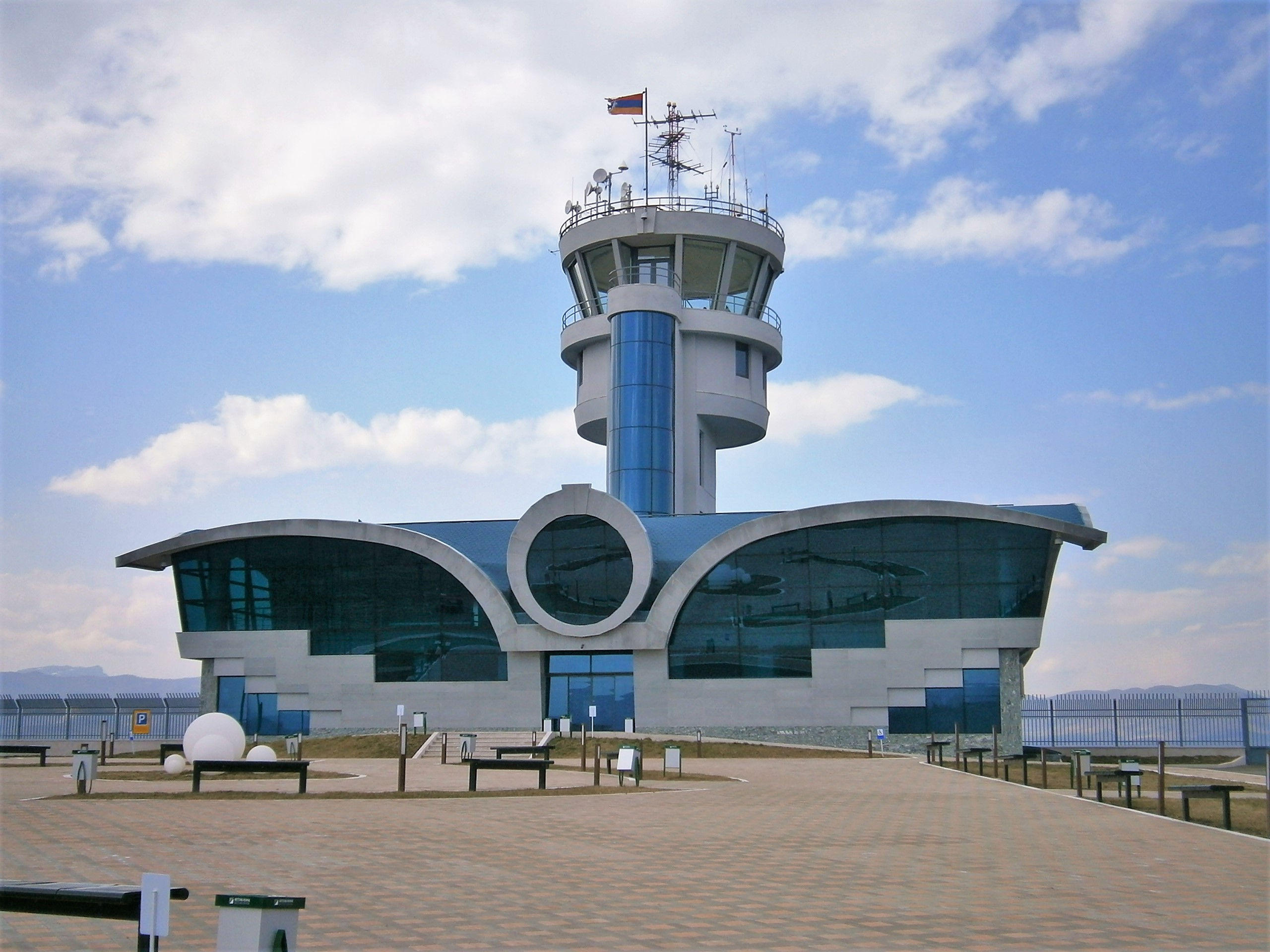
Stepanakert Airport

=== Bus ===
Stepanakert was served by a number of regular minibus lines. Old Soviet-era buses have been replaced with new modern buses. Regular trips to other provinces of Nagorno-Karabakh were also operated from the city.

=== Air ===
Stepanakert was served by the nearby Stepanakert Airport, north of the city near the town of Khojaly. In 2009, facilities reconstruction and repair work began. Though originally scheduled to launch the first commercial flights on 9 May 2011, Karabakh officials postponed a new reopening date throughout the whole of 2011. In May 2012, the director of the NKR's Civil Aviation Administration, Tigran Gabrielyan, announced that the airport would begin operations in summer 2012. However, the airport still remains closed due to political reasons. The OSCE Minsk Group, which mediates the Nagorno-Karabakh conflict, stated that "operation of [Stepanakert Airport] cannot be used to support any claim of a change in the status of Nagorno-Karabakh" and "urged the sides to act in accordance with international law and consistent with current practice for flights over their territory."

=== Railway ===
Stepanakert used to be connected through a railway line via Aghdam and Barda to the Yevlakh station on the Baku-Tbilisi railway. However, trips were discontinued due to the Nagorno-Karabakh conflict. As of 2024, the railway is undergoing reconstruction, with the section between Aghdam and Barda expected to reopen in 2025.

== Notable people ==
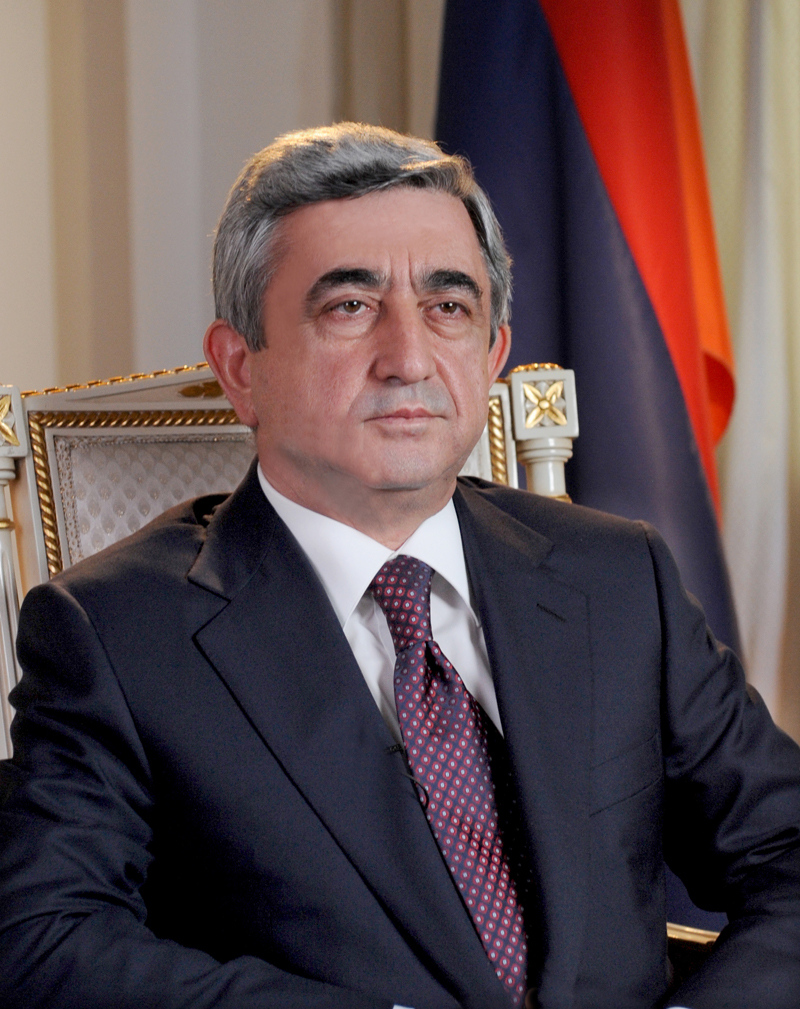
Serzh Sargsyan; third President of Armenia.

- Armen Abaghian – Armenian academic
- Armen Adamyan – Armenian professional football coach and a former player
- Nairuhi Alaverdyan – folk singer
- André – Armenian singer
- Don Askarian – Armenian filmmaker
- Vladimir Arzumanyan – Armenian singer, winner of the Junior Eurovision Song Contest 2010
- Samvel Babayan – Armenian military general
- Zori Balayan – Armenian writer
- Flora Gasimova – Azerbaijani politician
- Bakhshi Galandarli – Azerbaijani theatrical figure, actor and director.
- Narine Grigoryan - Armenian actress
- Hovik Hayrapetyan - is an Armenian chess Grandmaster (2013).
- Mihran Hakobyan - Armenian sculptor
- Karen Karapetyan – Armenian politician, 14th prime minister of Armenia
- Robert Kocharyan – Armenian politician, second president of Armenia
- Fakhraddin Manafov – Azerbaijani actor
- Marat Manafov – Azerbaijani businessman
- David Markosian - is an Armenian grandmaster.
- Shirin Mirzayev – Azerbaijani colonel
- Serzh Sargsyan – Armenian politician, third president of Armenia
- Roza Sarkisian – theatre director in Ukraine
- Zahra Shahtakhtinskaya – Soviet zoologist
- Nikolay Yenikolopyan – Soviet Armenian chemist, academician
- Gor Manvelyan – professional footballer
