= Faraj bey Aghayev =

Azerbaijani Imperial Russian military commander

- Born: December 4, 1814; Shusha, Karabakh Khanate
- Died: November 26, 1891 (aged 76); Tiflis, Russian Empire
- Military career
- Allegiance: (Russian Empire)
- Branch: Cavalry
- Service years: 1834 — 1882
- Rank: (Russian Empire) Lieutenant general of The Imperial Russian Army
- Unit: Cavalry
- Conflicts: Crimean War
- Awards: 3rd Class Order of Saint Vladimir 1st Class Ode of Saint Stanislaus 1stClass Order of Saint Anne Order of the Lion and the Sun

Farajulla bey Irza bey oghlu Aghayev (Azerbaijani: Fərəculla bəy İrza bəy oğlu Ağayev, born December 4, 1814, Shusha, Karabakh Khanate - died 26 November 1891, Tiflis, Russian Empire) was a decorated Azerbaijani Imperial Russian military commander, having the rank of Lieutenant general.

Faraj bey was a descendant of the Agayevs, one of the most famous noble families in Azerbaijan. He was a relative of famous Azerbaijani female biologist Zahra Shahtakhtinskaya. He was also Hasan bey Zardabi's father's uncle and helped him get an education.

== Life ==
Faraj or Farajulla bey Irza bey oglu was born on December 4, 1814, in Shusha into a noble family. May 1, 1834 began service in the Transcaucasian Muslim Cavalry Regiment, in Warsaw. He was awarded "for distinction in service" on 27 July 1827 and was promoted to praporshchik.

In the spring of 1840, cornet Faraj bey, as part of the newly formed Life Guards of the Muslim Team of His Own Imperial Majesty's Escort, was sent to St. Petersburg. On April 27, 1844, Captain Faraj bey Agayev converted to Orthodoxy. The godparents were Emperor Nicholas I and Tsesarevna Maria Alexandrovna. At baptism, he received the name Nikolai Nikolaevich. After he was transferred to the Life Guards Cossack Regiment. In 1847, captain Faraj bey was appointed commander of the life squadron of the Cossack regiment. On December 6, 1849, he was promoted to colonel.

In 1850, Agaev was sent to the Separate Caucasian Corps. In 1853, at the beginning of the Crimean War, Colonel Agayev formed an irregular cavalry regiment from the Azerbaijanis living in Karabakh. In 1854, a police regiment of Ossetians joined Agaev's regiment. For distinction in the Crimean War, Colonel Nikolai Agaev was awarded on November 5, 1856, a golden shashki with the inscription "For Courage". On June 25, 1862, he was promoted to major general. In 1864, the Qajar's Shah awarded him with the Order of the Lion and the Sun, 2nd degree with a star. In 1872 he was granted the Order of the Medjidie 1st degree by the Ottoman Sultan. In addition, he was awarded the Order of St. Vladimir 3rd degree (1859), the Order of Saint Stanislaus 1st degree (1866), the Order of St. Anna 1st degree with swords (1868).

On November 29, 1882, Major General Faraj bey who was in the army cavalry with the troops of the Caucasus Military District, was promoted to lieutenant general "with dismissal from service with a uniform and a pension." Until the end of his life he was a member of the Tiflis Muslim Charitable Society.

He died November 26, 1891.

== Awards ==
- - 3rd Class Order of Saint Vladimir with Swords and Banners (1859)
- - Order of the Lion and the Sun (1864)
- - 2nd Class Order of Saint Stanislaus (1866)
- - 1st Class Order of Saint Anne (1868)
- - Order of the Medjidie (1872)
