= Holy Mother of God Cathedral, Stepanakert =

Church in Stepanakert, Azerbaijan

Holy Mother of God Cathedral
- Սուրբ Աստվածամոր Հովանու մայր տաճար
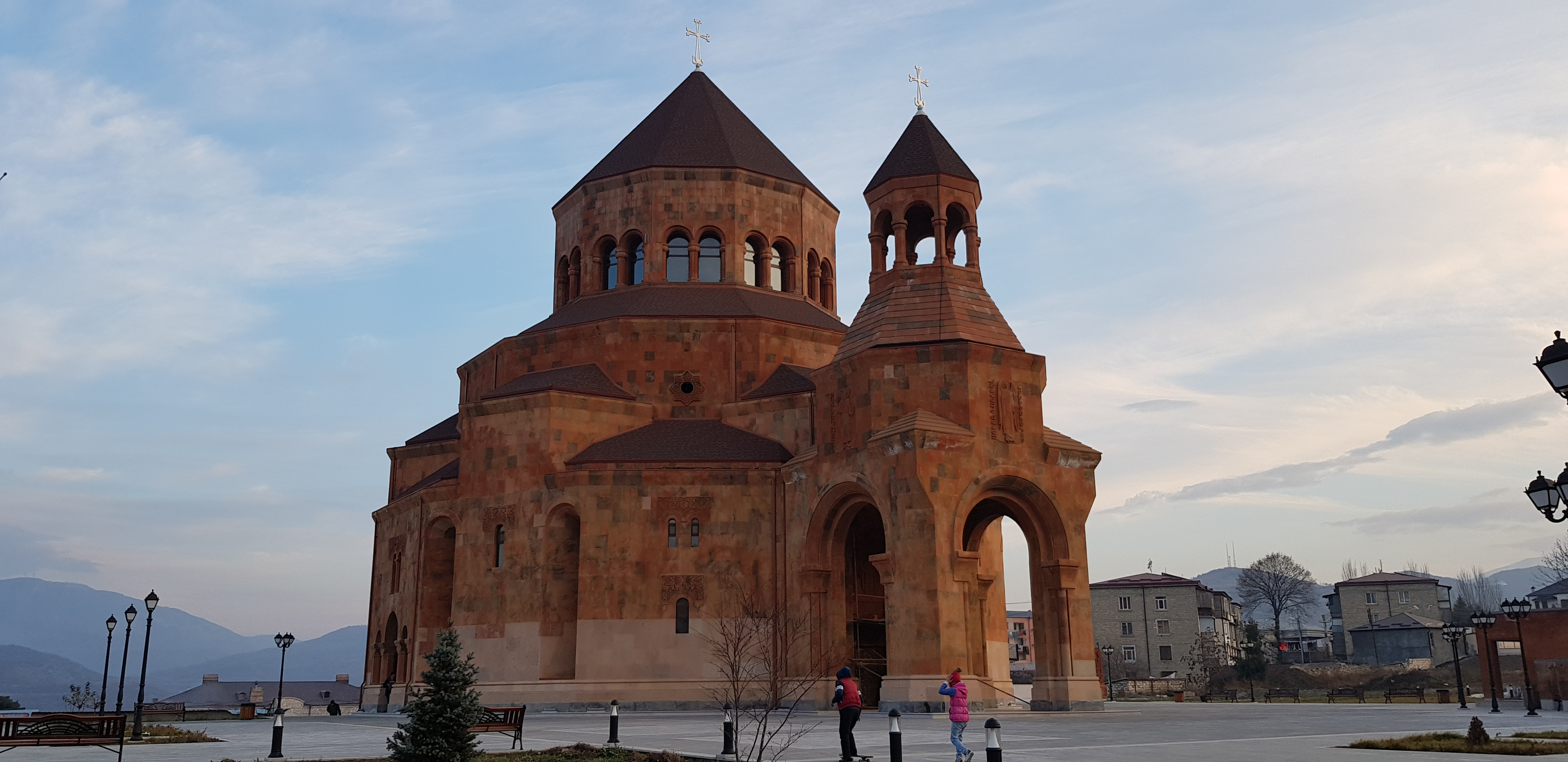
- The church after completion in 2019

- Location within Azerbaijan

Religion
- Affiliation: Armenian Apostolic Church
- Rite: Armenian
- Status: Destroyed

Location
- Location: Stepanakert, Nagorno-Karabakh, Azerbaijan
- Coordinates: 39°48′46″N 46°44′56″E

Architecture
- Type: Cathedral
- Style: Armenian
- Groundbreaking: 2006
- Completed: 2019
- Demolished: April 2026

Holy Mother of God Cathedral (Armenian: Սուրբ Աստվածամոր Հովանու մայր տաճար, romanized: Surb Astvatsamor Hovanu Mayr Tachar; Azerbaijani: Müqəddəs Məryəm Ana kilsəsi), also known as Surb Astvatsamor Hovanu Cathedral, was a church of the Armenian Apostolic Church, located in the city of Stepanakert, Nagorno-Karabakh, Azerbaijan. A 4-meter (13 foot) statue of King Vachagan III was planned to be placed on a 2-meter (6 foot) pedestal near the church. The church – under construction for 12 years – was consecrated on 7 April 2019.

== History ==
The cathedral became a bomb shelter during the 2020 Nagorno-Karabakh war, with civilians taking refuge in the basement of the cathedral from Azerbaijan's bombardment of Stepanakert.

The last liturgy was served in the cathedral on 1 October 2023 before the entire Armenian population had fled the city and Azerbaijan had taken control.

The cathedral was demolished by Azerbaijan in April 2026, before Armenian Genocide Remembrance Day.

== Gallery ==
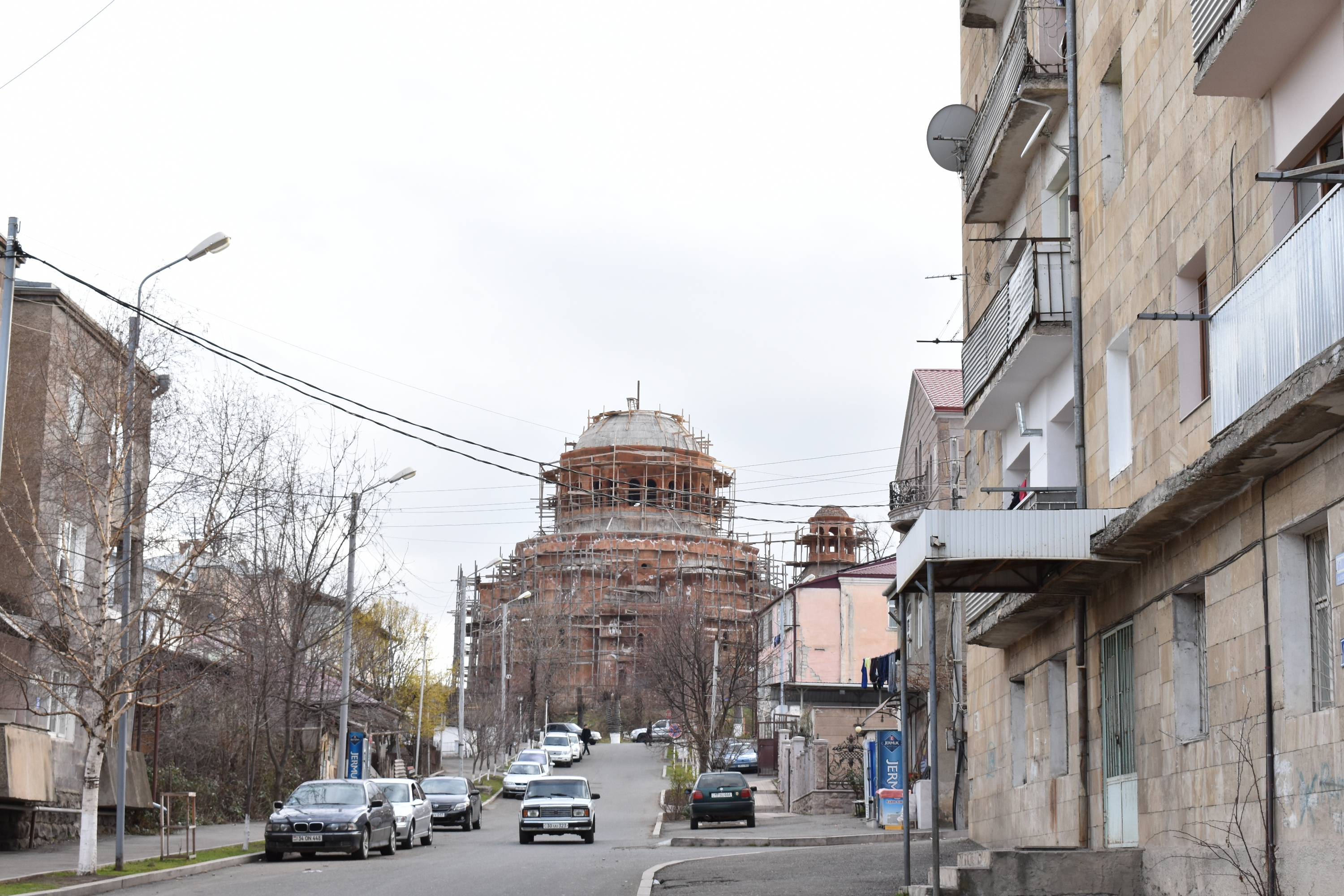
The cathedral under construction in 2018

== See also ==
- Armenia–Azerbaijan relations
- Christianity in Azerbaijan
