= Artsakh University =

Public university in Stepanakert, Republic of Artsakh

Artsakh State University
- Արցախի Պետական Համալսարան
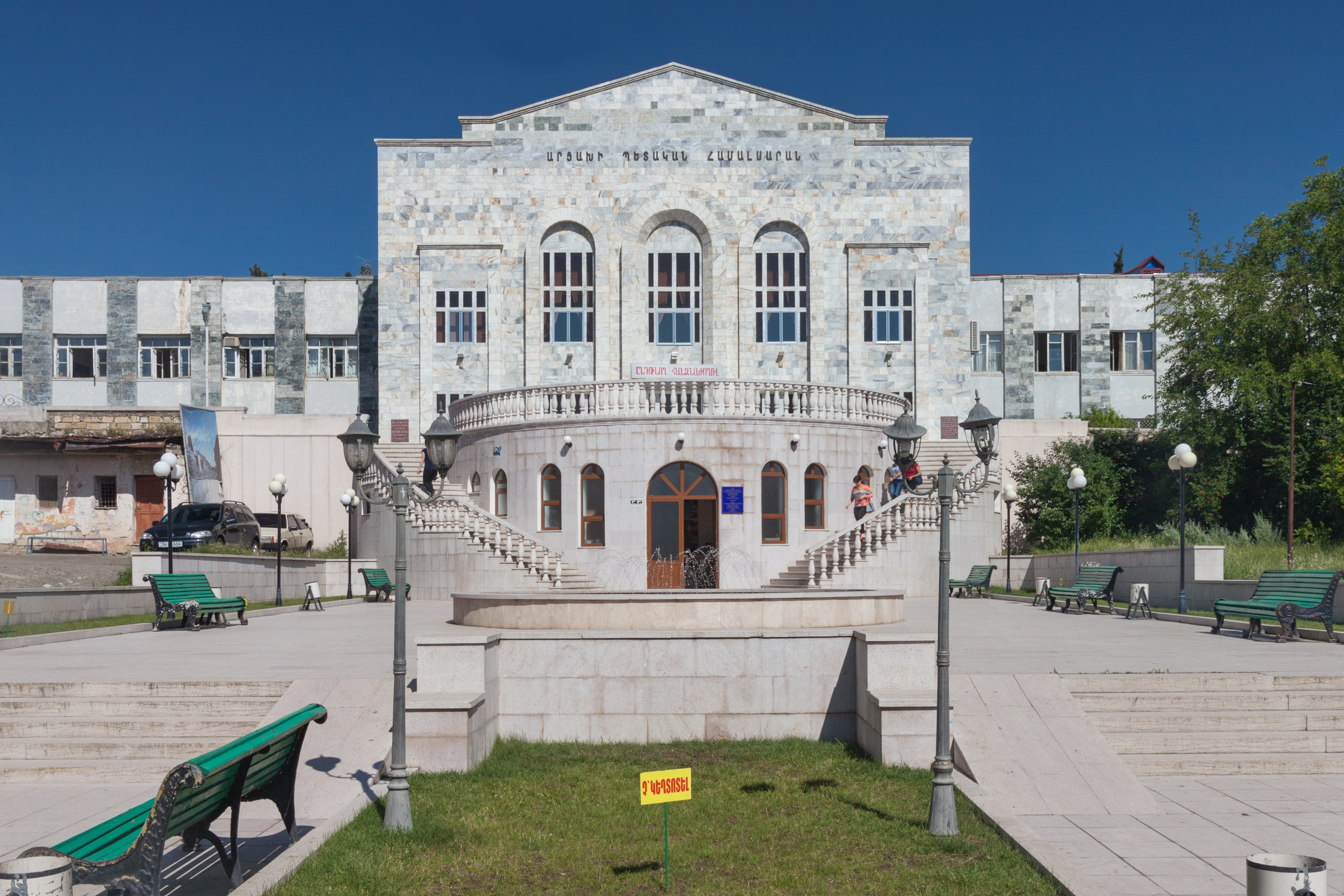
- Former names: Stepanakert State Pedagogical Institute; Artsakh State University
- Type: Public
- Active: 1969–2023
- Location: Mkhitar Gosh 5, Stepanakert, 375000, NKR; 39.82496°N 46.76205°E
- Campus: Urban
- Website: www.asu.am

Artsakh State University (Armenian: Արցախի Պետական Համալսարան) was a university in Stepanakert. It was the oldest and largest university in the self-proclaimed Republic of Artsakh, and it produced over 20,000 graduates in 60 fields of study over the course of its 50-year history.

After the 2023 Azerbaijani offensive and the flight of Nagorno-Karabakh Armenians, the university building was appropriated by the Azerbaijan Ministry of Education for Karabakh University (Azerbaijani: Qarabağ Universiteti) on November 28, 2023. Karabakh University started admitting students in 2024.

Students from Artsakh State University have campaigned for the university to resume operations in exile in Armenia.

== History ==
The university was established in 1969, in Stepanakert, the centre of the Nagorno-Karabakh Autonomous Oblast.

At the time of its establishment, the university was called the Stepanakert Branch of the Azerbaijan State Pedagogical Institute named after Lenin and had only two Chairs: the Chair of Language and Literature and the Chair of Mathematics. Education was conducted in Armenian, Azerbaijani, and later in Russian.

In 1973, the university gained independent status and was renamed Stepanakert State Pedagogical Institute.

In the second half of the 1980s, at the start of a new stage of the Artsakh Armenians’ independence movement, the university became a scientific centre of the national struggle.

As a result, classes at Stepanakert State Pedagogical Institute were temporarily suspended, and the university moved to Vanadzor Pedagogical Institute. After the Spitak earthquake of December 7, 1988, the university's lecturers and students had to return to Stepanakert, where it operated as the Stepanakert branch of Vanadzor Pedagogical Institute.

=== Artsakh State University ===
In October 1992, the Government of Armenia decided to merge the Stepanakert branch of Vanadzor Pedagogical Institute with the Stepanakert branch of Yerevan Engineering University, naming the newly established university Artsakh State University ( ASU).

During the independence of the Nagorno-Karabakh Republic, the university developed significantly. In the 2008-2009 academic year, after joining the Bologna Process, the university introduced a three-level system of education comprising Bachelor, Master and Doctorate Studies. The educational system was organized in full-time and part-time sections.

The campus of the university consisted of three subsidiary buildings and an administrative building. Prior to 2023, the university had developed five professional faculties with around 3 000 students. The 200-member staff of the university included 16 Professors, 78 Associate Professors, 53 Senior Lecturers and 15 Assistants.

Professionals from Artsakh, Armenia and abroad were invited to deliver lectures on a contractual basis. Prior to the building's appropriation, around 50 postgraduate students were enrolled in the Doctorate Study programme to defend their PhD theses and be awarded Doctor of Sciences degrees.

The educational centres operating at the university included

- the Armenological Centre
- the Ethnographic Centre
- the Centre of Friends of Russian Culture
- the Knowledge Testing Computer Centre

There were three computer labs, other laboratories, a basic military training room, a shooting hall, two gyms and two conference rooms. An assembly hall with more than 300 seats hosted cultural activities, and a smaller assembly hall hosted sessions of the Scientific Council, conferences and discussions.

The university library held 100,000 books, and its electronic library around 40,000 books.

The university had a publishing unit that issued the "Academic Bulletin", the "Armenological Magazine", Artsakh State University's monthly magazine, and scientific-educational and other literature. Students attended lectures in the university observatory.

State and political figures and spiritual leaders periodically visited and delivered lectures at the university. These included the academician A. Aghabekyan, the publicist Zori Balayan, Kim Bakshi, A. Nuykin, the former Vice-Speaker of the UK Parliament Caroline Cox, the member of the Swiss Parliament Dominik de Buman, the member of the European Parliament Francois Rosblanch, the historians R. Hovhanisyan, V. Dadryan and A. Ohanjanyan, the politicians Sh. Kocharyan and V. Manasyan, the academicians S. Grigoryan, E. Ghasaryan and V. Zakaryan, the oceanologist A. Sarkissov, the linguist G. Jahoukyan, the physicist R. Martirosyan, the economist Y. Suvaryan, the engineer S. Beglaryan, the Catholicos of All Armenians Garegin the Second, and the head of the Artsakh diocese of the Armenian Apostolic Church, Archbishop Pargev Martirosyan.

ASU had collaboration agreements with Yerevan State University, Yerevan State Pedagogical University after Kh. Abovyan, Public Administration Academy of the RA, Armenian State University of Economics, National Agricultural University of Armenia, State Architectural University of Armenia, Yerevan State Architectural and Engineering University, Vanadzor Pedagogical University after H. Tumanyan, and Gyumri State Pedagogical University after M. Nalbandyan.

ASU had initiated contacts with the Educational Academy of the Russian Federation, Vladimir State University and Saratov University. The university had established closer contacts and signed Association Agreements with universities of other post-Soviet breakaway states – the university of the Pridnestrovian Moldavian Republic and the universities of Abkhazia and South Ossetia – and had set up a scientific cabinet devoted to these sister universities.

The university held programmes in collaboration with American University of Armenia, Armenian-Russian (Slavic) University, French University of Armenia, Central European University of Slovakia, Californian State University (Fresno) and other universities.

The university also took part in a three-sided cooperation to implement an educational programme with the international institutions "Synopsis-Armenia" and "Karabakh Telecom" CJSC.

The ASU diplomas and certificates were recognized in the Artsakh Republic, Armenia and abroad. The university had educated the legal, executive, juridical, military, political, pedagogical and sport leadership of the Artsakh Republic.

==== Daily life ====
The university had a green area with summer houses and walkways lined with evergreen trees, where students could relax and prepare for classes.

The university operated three canteens.

There was a 250-room dormitory for students from remote regions of the Artsakh Republic and experts invited from abroad.

Visitors and official delegations to the university paid respect at a memorial dedicated to the 75 students who were killed in the First Nagorno-Karabakh War.

==== Study abroad program ====
In 2011, with the help of Artsakh Development Group, a non-profit organization that raises awareness in the United States of issues concerning Artsakh, the university launched a study abroad program. The program was launched with the California State University at Dominguez Hills to allow 12–15 students to spend a summer in Artsakh and take courses on the politics, history, and economy of Artsakh and Armenia.

==== Research ====
The Artsakh State University consisted of five departments: the Faculty of Natural Sciences, the Faculty of Philology (Linguistics), the Faculty of Pedagogy and Sports, the Faculty of History and Law, and the Faculty of Economics. The scholars and students of the Artsakh State University commonly engaged in research in the areas of National Security, Politics, Agricultural Studies, and Archaeology.

In 2006, a team of international archaeologists began research in the village of Azokh, where discoveries in the 1970s had shown that the site was home to ancient settlers, including Neanderthals. Armenian scientists, including two Artsakh State University students, participated actively throughout the research period.

==== Faculties ====
- the Faculty of Natural Sciences
- the Philological Faculty
- the Faculty of Pedagogy and Sport
- the Faculty of History and Law
- the Faculty of Economics

==== University Chairs ====
- the Chair of Mathematics
- the Chair of General and Applied Physics
- the Chair of Geography
- the Chair of Biology and Chemistry
- the Chair of Applied Mathematics and Informatics
- the Chair of Romance-Germanic Languages
- the Chair of Russian Language and Literature
- the Chair of Armenian Language after academician S. Abrahamyan
- the Chair of Literature and Journalism
- the Chair of Pedagogy and Psychology
- the Chair of Physical Training and Military Training
- the Chair of Fine Arts
- the Chair of History and Political Science
- the Chair of Law
- the Chair of Finance and Accounting
- the Chair of Economic Theory and Management

==== Partner institutions ====
- University of Central Europe, Skalica, Slovakia
- Russian-Armenian (Slavonic) University, Yerevan, Armenia
- (United States) California State University, Dominguez Hills, Los Angeles County, California
- Université catholique de Louvain, Louvain-la-Neuve, Belgium

== See also ==
- List of universities in the Republic of Artsakh
