= Marat Manafov =

Azerbaijani businessman and lawyer

- Born: Marat Manaf oglu Manafov; Khankendi, Azerbaijan
- Disappeared: November 1999; Bratislava, Slovakia
- Status: Missing for 26 years, 10 months and 27 days
- Education: Tyumen State University; Baku State University
- Occupation: Businessman

Marat Manaf oglu Manafov was an Azerbaijani businessman and lawyer who disappeared in Bratislava, Slovakia, in 1999. He was described as the "right-hand man" of Azeri president Heydar Aliyev and was a negotiator for contracts in Azerbaijan's petroleum market.

== Early life and education ==
Manafov was born in Khankendi, capital of the Nagorno-Karabakh Autonomous Oblast. His family moved to Baku in 1960.

He studied geology at Baku State University, then moved to the Arctic to work, where he finished his degree by correspondence. He then returned to school to study law in the Siberian city of Tyumen, which has a prominent oil and gas industry.

He soon gained prominence and wealth as an attorney. He moved to Paris for three years, and then to Bratislava, Slovakia.

== Career ==
In the early 1990s, he began an import-export business in Slovakia, that had an emphasis on oil, particularly from Azerbaijan and Tyumen.

Manafov became a close confidant of the Azeri president Heydar Aliyev, and was described as his "right-hand man."

In 1993, Manafov was appointed by the newly independent Azerbaijani government to negotiate business deals for Azerbaijan's booming oil industry. Manafov led the government team controlling what became known as the "Contract of the Century" that opened up Azerbaijan's vast oil reserves to the west. According to journalist Steve LeVine, Manafov "shook up meetings by pointing a pistol at Western oil executives." During a meeting with British, Canadian and U.S. oil executives, in which everyone pulled out their business cards, Manafov pulled out a 9mm pistol and placed it on the table. He was later accused of pointing the gun at executives from Pennzoil and BP, LeVine writes. Manafov claimed he was being followed, which the executives denied. Manafov, who also claimed his accounts had been frozen, and his cell phone cut off, stated he had been offered a bribe to cut Pennzoil out of the negotiations. However, executive Tom Doss from Amoco later discovered his company had indeed paid someone to follow Manafov.

Manafov was later accused of demanding $360 million in bribes from oil executives, which he claimed would go to Aliyev. He ultimately was expelled from Azerbaijan. In late 1999, he disappeared in Bratislava, Slovakia, after making allegations about "the secret dealings of the Aliyev family with oil companies," according to an exposé in The Sunday Times. Police stated they were investigating whether he was abducted or killed.

== Family ==
He had five brothers, one of whom is noted actor Fakhraddin Manafov.

== See also ==
- List of people who disappeared mysteriously: post-1970
