= Fatma Suleymanova =

- Born: 23 December 1912; Shusha, Russian Empire
- Died: 2 December 1978 (aged 65); Baku, Azerbaijani SSR
- Scientific career
- Fields: Motor fuel and oils
- Institutions: Azerbaijan National Academy of Sciences, Azerbaijan Polytechnic Institute

Fatma Suleymanova (born 23 December 1912, Shusha, Russian Empire - died 2 December 1978, Baku, Azerbaijan SSR) was a doctor of technical sciences (1964), professor (1967), laureate of the Azerbaijan SSR State Prize (1970), and honored inventor of the USSR (1979).

== Life ==
After graduating from the Leningrad Highway Institute (1934), she worked in various positions in the system of the Ministry of Road Transport of Azerbaijan. She worked as a laboratory director at the Oil and Chemical Processes (1952–1965) and Chemical Additives Institutes (1965–1970) of the Azerbaijan National Academy of Sciences, and from 1970, she worked as the head of the automobile department at the Azerbaijan Polytechnic Institute. Her research was mainly in the field of motor fuel and oils. She received 15 authorship certificates. She was awarded the Red Banner of Labor and Order of the Badge of Honour. She died in Baku in 1978.

== Awards ==
- Laureate of the Azerbaijan SSR State Prize (1970).
- "Red Banner of Labor".
- "Order of the Badge of Honour".

== Sources ==
- Chingizoglu, Anvar (2011). Suleymanovs. Baku: Soy. p. 159.
