= Mammed =

Mammed is a masculine given name of Arabic origin. It is a variant of the name Muhammad (see the article "Muhammad" for other variants of the name). Notable people with the name include:

- Mammed Said Ordubadi (1872–1950), Azerbaijani writer, poet, playwright, and journalist

== See also ==
- V. K. C. Mammed Koya, Indian politician
- Mamed, Mamet, Mammet
- Mammad
