= Mamed =

Mamed is a masculine given name of Arabic origin. It is a variant of the name Muhammad (see the article "Muhammad" for other variants of the name). It gives rise to the patronymic surname Mamedov. Notable people with the name include:

== Given name ==
- Mamed Aghaev (born 1976), Russian wrestler
- Mamed Aliyev (1934–2004), Azerbaijani engineer
- Mamed Ibragimov (born 1992), Kazakh-Azerbaijani freestyle wrestler
- Mamed İbragimov (born 1946), Azerbaijani wrestler
- Mamed Iskenderov (1915–1985), Azerbaijani politician
- Mamed Khalidov (born 1980), Russian-Polish mixed martial artist

== See also ==
- Mamet, Mammet
- Mammad, Mammed
