= Azerbaijan State Pedagogical University =

University in Azerbaijan

- Azərbaycan Dövlət Pedaqoji Universiteti
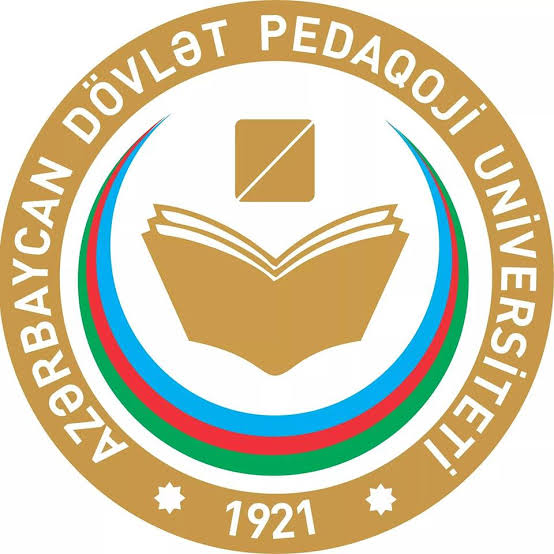
- Motto: A university faithful to traditions, open to innovations!
- Other campuses: Shaki; Quba; Aghjabadi; Jalilabad; Shamakhi
- Type: Public
- Established: 26 August 1921; 104 years ago
- Affiliations: BSUN; ETEN; IAUP; TÜRKSOY
- Rector: Jafar Jafarov
- Academic staff: 730
- Students: 18300
- Address: AZ1000, Baku 68, Uzeyir Hajibeyli str., Baku, Azerbaijan; 40°22′22″N 49°50′54″E
- Campus: Urban
- Language: Azerbaijani; Russian; English
- Academic term: Semester
- Transportation: Line 1 Sahil metrostation Line 1 Ganjlik metro station ( 2nd campus)
- Colors: Moderate orange and white
- Website: adpu.edu.az/index.php/en/
- Location in Baku, Azerbaijan Azerbaijan State Pedagogical University (Azerbaijan) Azerbaijan State Pedagogical University (Caucasus Mountains)

University rankings

Azerbaijan State Pedagogical University (Azerbaijani: Azərbaycan Dövlət Pedaqoji Universiteti) or short ASPU - public university specializing in the training of pedagogical staff and professionals across a diverse range of fields.

== History ==
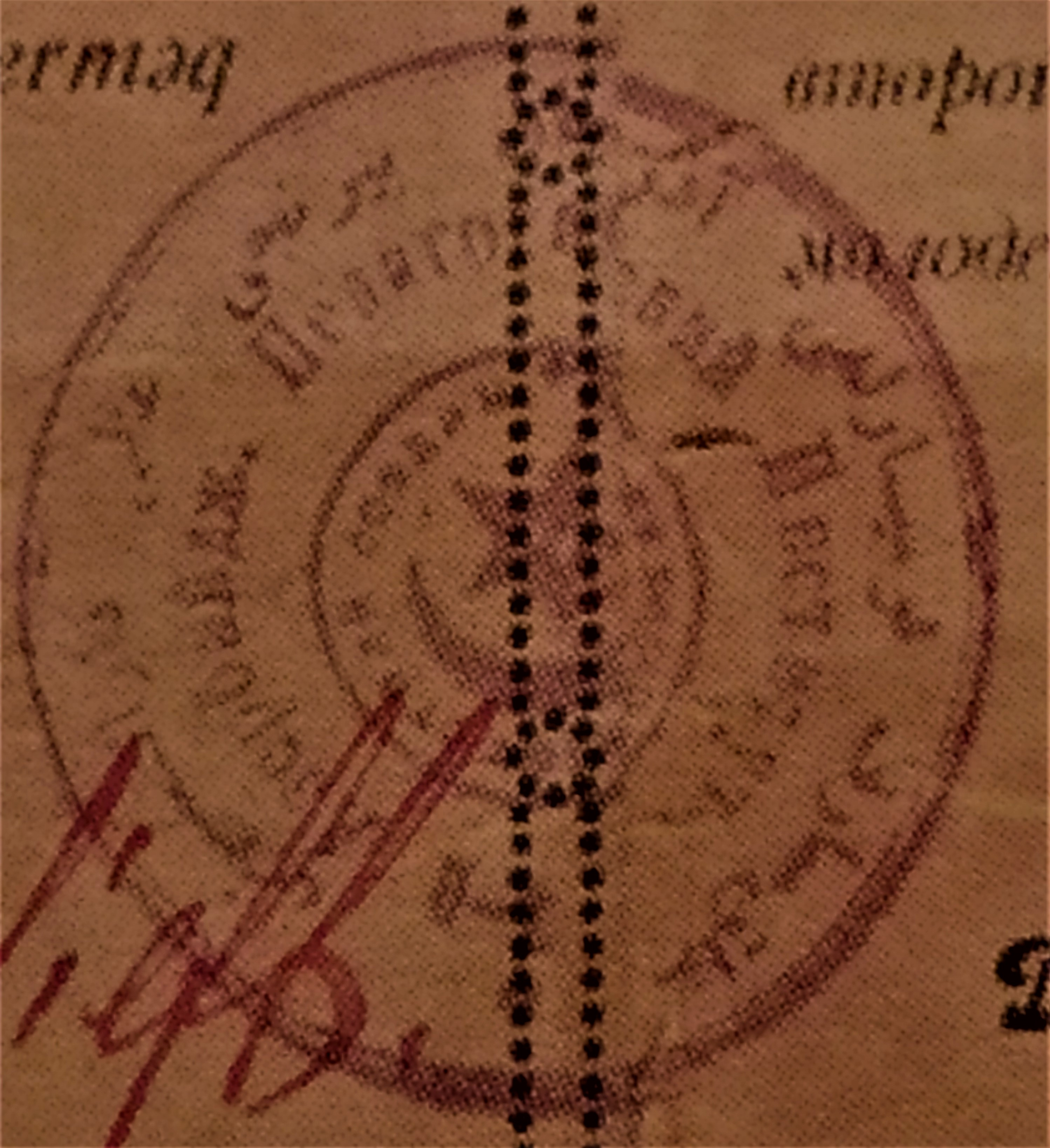
The seal of ASPU, 1926. The outer circle of the seal contains inscriptions in the old Azerbaijani alphabet, stating "People’s Commissariat of Education. Azerbaijan First Higher Darülfünun." The second circle features the Russian inscription "Azerbaijan Pedagogical Institute.".

The Azerbaijan State Pedagogical University was established in 1921 under Decree No. 66, ''On the Organization of the Higher Pedagogical Institute of Men,'' dated August 26, 1921, and signed by the Chairman of the Council of People's Commissars of Azerbaijan, Nariman Narimanov. Its first graduation was in 1924 with 28 graduates. In 1972, the Institute was awarded the Order of the Red Banner of Labor.

Before its foundation, an Organizing Committee (Preparatory Commission) was created for the establishment of the institute in late 1920. Fatullah Bey Rzabeyli was appointed the Chairman of the Committee. The members were Habib Bey Mahmudbeyov and Rahim Jafarov. Abdulla Shaig, Muhammed bey Efendiyev, and Sadig Huseynov also took part in the activities of the committee. They also participated in the organization of the one-year pedagogical courses which played a key role in the establishment of the Pedagogical Institute in Azerbaijan and also delivered lectures in these courses.

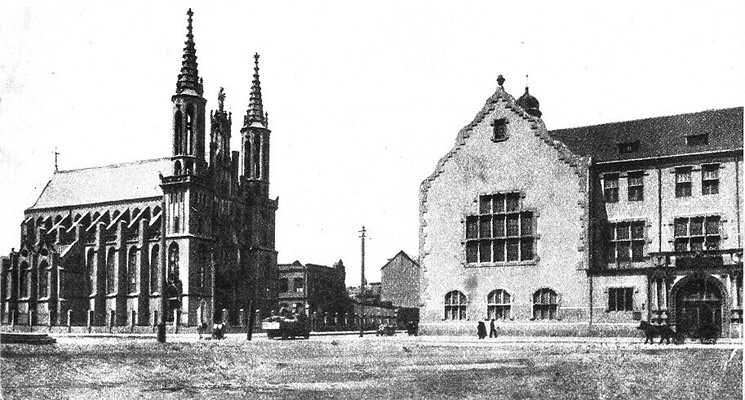
1916

The Organizing Committee was to prepare a curriculum for the institute and present it to the Azerbaijani People's State Education Commission, to find qualified personnel and to resolve the issue of teaching aids and construction. The Committee began its work on June 9, 1920.

On June 13, 1921, the Azerbaijani People's Education Commission approved the first statute of the Pedagogical Institute. The statute defines the structure, duties, and rights of the institution and also specifies the subject disciplines included in the curriculum, as well as the rules of the colloquium, acts of admission and examinations to strengthen the knowledge and control of students. According to the curriculum, students in the first year were supposed to teach the subjects such as mathematics, Mother tongue, the Russian language, literature, music, etc. In the second year, students were divided into specialties and trained in accordance with the relevant subjects. On November 12, 1921, three days before the beginning of the classes, the first meeting of the Council of the Institute was held at the Pedagogical Institute and questions were also discussed about the organization of lessons and other important tasks.

In the first years, the Institute trained teachers in the fields of history, philology, chemistry, physics, and mathematics as well as theoretical courses and experimental studies in botany, zoology, physiology, chemistry, geology, and mineralogy. The students were educated within the framework of the program of the Baku State University by such teachers as F. Rasulzade, S. Huseynov, A. A. Amirov, S. Kh. Osinanzade. In this period, the most powerful scientific center of the department was the faculty of physiology.

In 1921, the Department of History and Public Literature was established. The new department was responsible for teaching the humanitarian and special disciplines, philosophy, logic, pedagogy, didactics, political economy, the foundations of the state law and other subjects. From 1925 to 1926 the department was divided into two independent departments: the Department of History and the Department of Philology.

Between 1923 and 1924, the Ministry of Education of Azerbaijan allocated 112 thousand manats for educational, scientific and economic work of the institute. In those years, the Institute's basic library was also enriched. At the time of the library's creation, there were just 50 books in the Azerbaijani language and 73 books in different languages. A few years later, the library fund of German literature was significantly increased from Moscow and other cities. In the academic year 1923-24, there were 2,000 copies in Azerbaijani and 1,000 copies in the Russian language in the library.

From 1924-25 school years, the institute began to work with a 4-year curriculum. At that time, 142 students were studying at the university. Students from neighboring countries, such as Georgia, Kazakhstan, Uzbekistan, etc., also studied at this educational institution.

== Academic profile ==
There are 330 teachers at 55 departments of the University, including 59 doctors of science, 329 candidates of science and associate professors, 4 full members of various academies of sciences. The University employs 730 people of support staff. The university includes a library and reading rooms, a computer room, an onomastic laboratory, a zoological museum, and a medical care center. There are more than 700 thousand copies in the library.

=== Faculties and programs ===
Faculty of Mathematics

- Bachelor of Arts in Mathematics Education
- Bachelor of Arts in Computer Science Education
- Bachelor of Arts in Mathematics Education (English)
- Bachelor of Arts in Math and Computer Science Education (English)
- Master of Arts in Teaching Methods and Methodology of Informatics
- Master of Arts in Teaching Methods and Methodology of Mathematics

Faculty of Chemistry and Biology

- Bachelor of Arts in Chemistry Education
- Bachelor of Arts in Biology Education
- Master of Arts in Teaching Methods and Methodology of Chemistry
- Master of Arts in Teaching Methods and Methodology of Biology

Faculty of Physics

- Bachelor of Arts in Technology Education
- Bachelor of Arts in Physics Education (English)
- Bachelor of Arts in Physics Education
- Master of Arts in Teaching Methods and Methodology of Physics

Faculty of History and Geography

- Bachelor of Arts in History Education
- Bachelor of Arts in Geography Education
- Bachelor of Arts in History and Geography Education
- Bachelor of Arts in Social Work
- Bachelor of Arts in History and Geography Education (English)
- Master of Arts in Teaching Methods and Methodology of Geography
- Master of Arts in Teaching Methods and Methodology of History
- Master of Arts in Social Work in Various Areas of Life Activity
- Master of Arts in Youth Work

Faculty of Primary Education

- Bachelor of Arts in Primary Education Teaching
- Bachelor of Arts in Primary Education Teaching (English)
- Teaching Methods and Methodology in Primary Classes

Faculty of Pre-School Education

- Bachelor of Arts in Socio-Psychological Services in Education
- Bachelor of Arts in Correctional Education
- Bachelor of Arts in Pre-School Education Teaching
- Master of Arts in Social Pedagogy
- Master of Arts in Theory and History of Pedagogy
- Master of Arts in Teaching Methods and Methodology of Preschool Education and Training
- Master of Arts in Teaching Methods and Methodology of Corrective Education
- Master of Arts in Social-Psychological Services in Education

Faculty of Philology

- Bachelor of Arts in Azerbaijani Language and Literature Teaching
- Bachelor of Arts in Turkish Language and Literature Teaching
- Bachelor of Arts in Foreign Language Teaching (French language)
- Bachelor of Arts in Foreign Language Teaching (English language)
- Master of Arts in Teaching Methods and Methodology of Azerbaijani Language and Literature
- Master of Arts in Assessment and Monitoring in Education
- Master of Arts in Teaching Methods and Methodology of Foreign Languages (English)
- Master of Arts in Teaching Methods and Methodology of Azerbaijani Language and Literature

Faculty of Arts and Physical Education

- Bachelor of Musical Education Teaching
- Bachelor of Physical Education Teaching
- Bachelor of Visual Arts Education Teaching
- Master of Arts in Teaching Methods and Methodology of Visual Arts
- Master of Arts in Teaching Methods and Methodology of Physical Education and Pre-Conscription Training

Special Programs

- MA in Education and Human Development & Management (Dual Degree with George Washington University)
- MBA in Educational Management
- MA in Organization and Methodology of Training and Teaching" (SABAH Groups)

=== Ranking ===
University rankings

Azerbaijan State Pedagogical University was ranked 1388th globally in the 2024 UI GreenMetric World Rankings. According to Webometrics, in the January 2025 edition of the Ranking Web of Universities, Azerbaijan State Pedagogical University ranked 6,616th out of 31,364 universities globally.

In the 2025 Times Higher Education Impact Rankings, Azerbaijan State Pedagogical University was ranked in the 1501+ band. It was assessed in SDG 4 (Quality Education) with a score of 46.3–51.0, SDG 8 (Decent Work and Economic Growth) with 0.8–38.6, SDG 16 (Peace, Justice and Strong Institutions) with 2.4–31.7, and SDG 17 (Partnerships for the Goals) with 2.1–44.7.

== Campuses ==
=== Sabail (Main) Campus ===
The main academic building of Azerbaijan State Pedagogical University is located at Uzeyir Hajibeyli Street, Baku, in the Sabail raion. This campus includes the Faculty of Philology, the Faculty of Mathematics, the Faculty of Physics, the Faculty of Chemistry and Biology, and the SABAH Center. Other facilities include an assembly hall, a conference room, the Heydar Aliyev Center (museum and lecture hall), the Career Center, the Library and Information Center, the university publishing house, chemistry and physics laboratories, a zoological museum, sports halls, and SABAH classrooms.

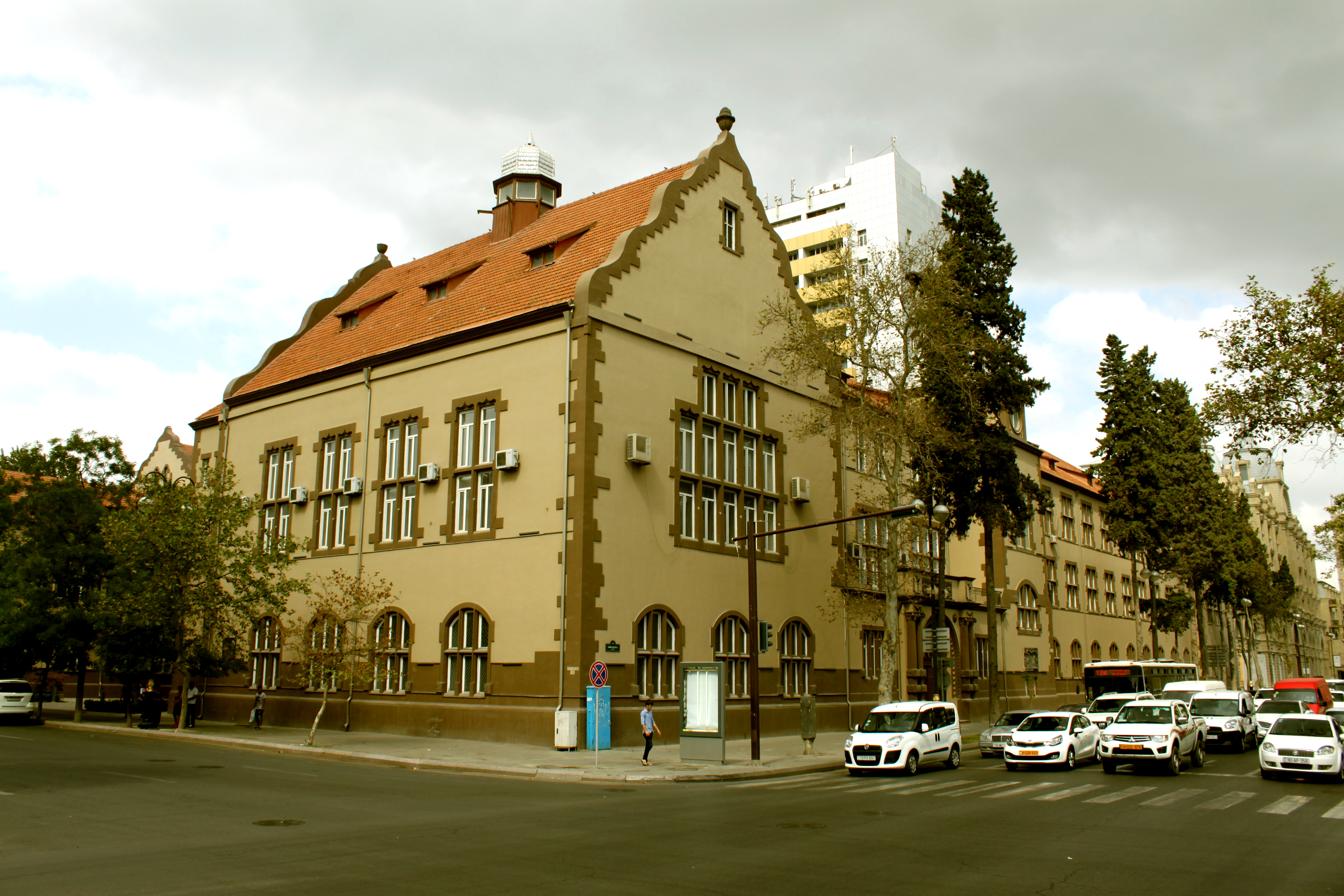
Main campus of university

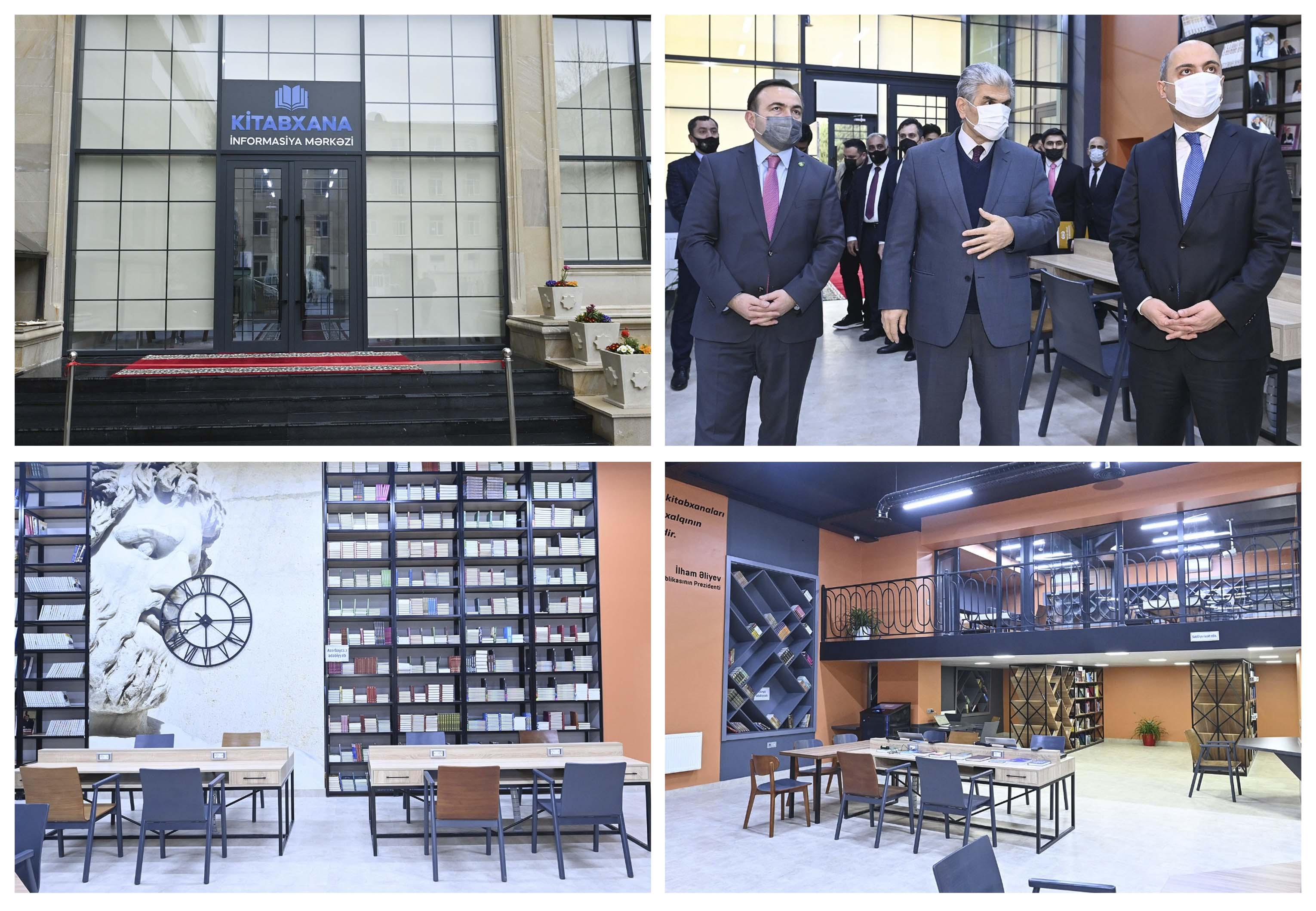
The Library and Information Center located on ASPU's Sabail campus.

=== Ganjlik Campus ===
The second academic building of ASPU is at Academic Hasan Aliyev Street, Baku, in the Narimanov raion. This campus includes the Faculty of History and Geography, the Graduate and Doctoral Studies Department, and the Department of Continuing Education and Innovations. Facilities include the Heydar Aliyev Center (museum and conference room), a dormitory for female international students, a Library and Information Center, amphitheater-style classrooms, an assembly hall, a sports hall, and inclusive education laboratories.

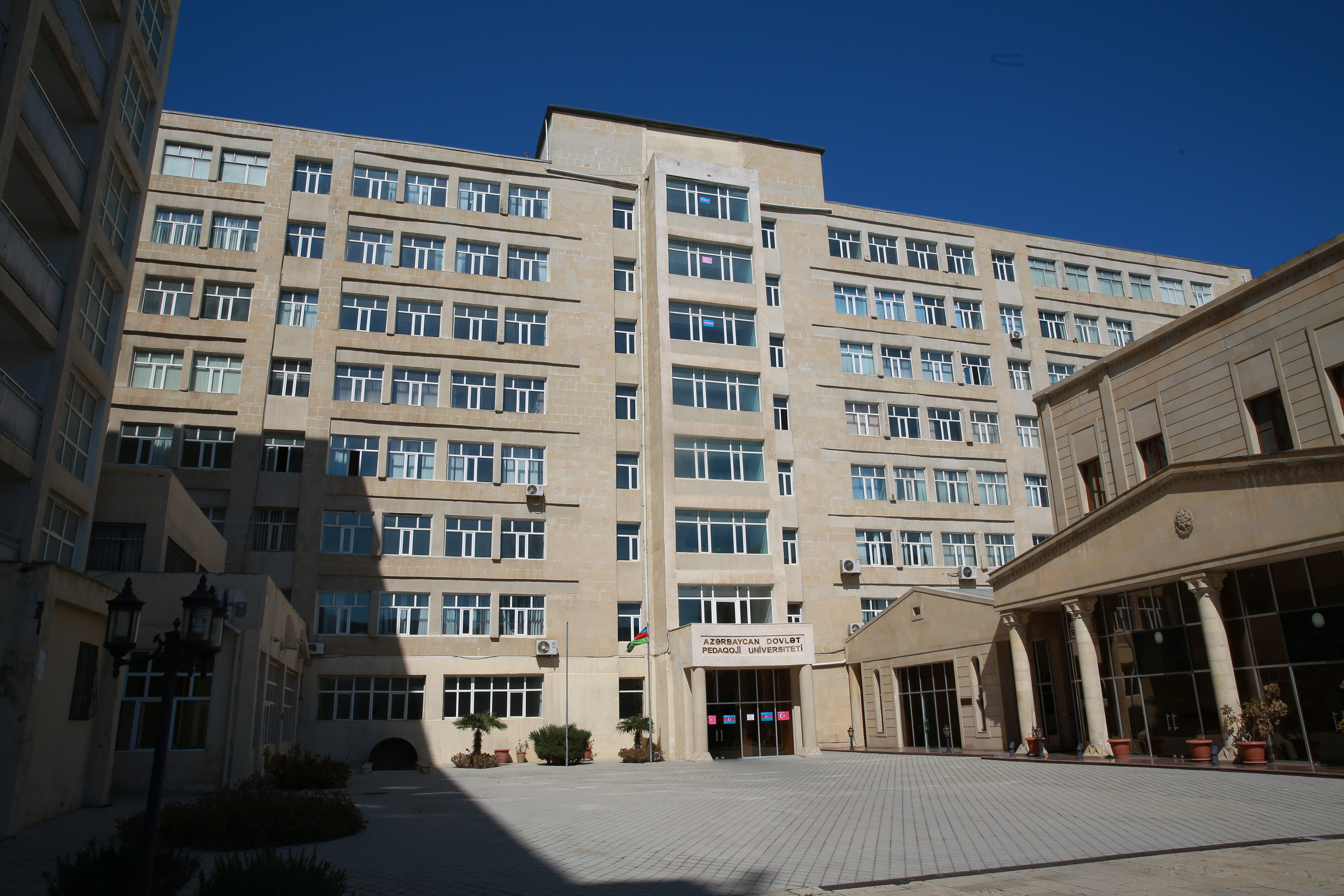
Ganjlik campus of university

=== Nasimi Campus ===
ASPU's third academic building is at Nasib Bey Yusifbeyli Street, Baku, in the Nasimi raion. This campus includes the Faculty of Arts and Physical Education and the Faculty of Primary Education. Facilities include City Polyclinic No. 29, a sports hall, music, painting, and sculpture rooms, and a library.

=== Tabriz Campus ===
The fourth academic building of ASPU is at Koroglu Rahimov Street, Baku, in the Nasimi raion. This campus includes the Faculty of Preschool Education, inclusive education laboratories, and a library.

== Branches ==
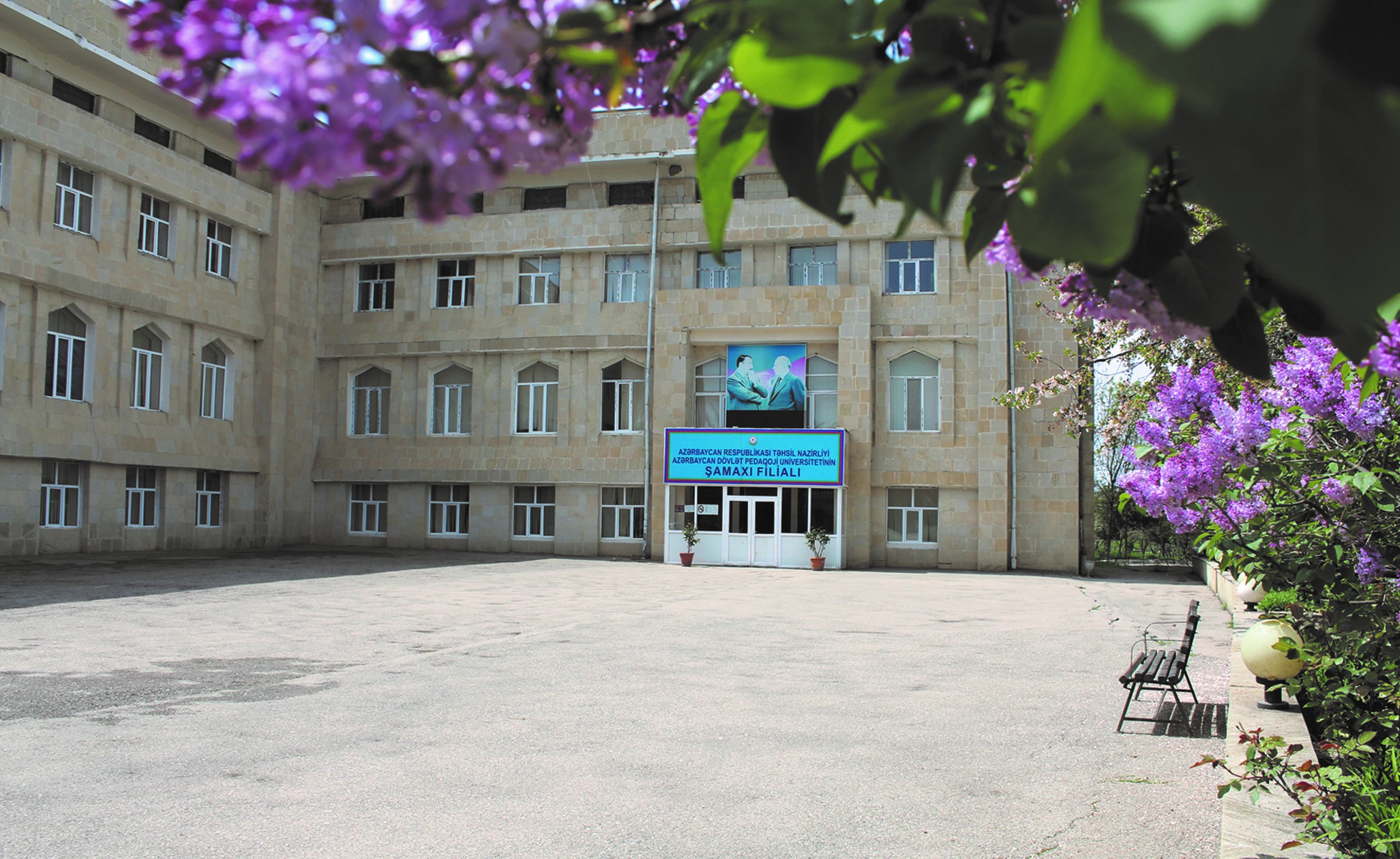
Shamakhi branch of ASPU.

Azerbaijan Pedagogical University has its branches in a number of cities such as Agjabadi, Guba, Jalilabad, Sheki, and Shamakhi.

The Agjabedi branch of the Azerbaijan Teachers' Institute was recognized as a branch of the Azerbaijan State Pedagogical University with the Presidential Decree dated November 26, 2015 No. 1582. Since 2012, the branch is headed by the candidate of philology, professor Farzalieva Matanat.

On June 14, 2000, the Guba branch was established on the basis of the Guba branch of the Azerbaijan State University of Culture and Arts with Decree No. 349 of president Heydar Aliyev.

Jalilabad branch was established on the basis of the Jalilabad Agricultural Technical School with the presidential decree dated June 13, 2000 "On improving the education system in the Republic of Azerbaijan". The head of the branch is Associate Professor, Ph.D. of Philosophy Khudayar Sultanly.

On June 14, 2000, by Decree No. 349 of the President of Azerbaijan, the Sheki Branch of the Azerbaijan Teachers` Institute was established on the basis of the Sheki branch of BSU and the Department for Advanced Training and Retraining of General Pedagogical Staff.

The Shamakhi branch of the Azerbaijan State Pedagogical University has been operating since 1991.

== Notable alumni ==
=== Politics ===
Abramov Yevda – Azerbaijani statesman, Deputy of Milli Majlis.

Mammad Alakbarov - the first Minister of Culture of Azerbaijan and a former Minister of Education.

Ali Naghiyev – Head of the State Security Service of Azerbaijan.

=== Science ===
Hamid Arasly – Soviet Azerbaijani scientist, academician of the Academy of Sciences of Azerbaijan SSR.

Budag Budagov – Azerbaijani geographer, academician of the Academy of Sciences of Azerbaijan SSR.

Ali Mammadov – Noted for his expertise in Arab studies and Orientalism.

Rahid Ulusel – Senior researcher at the Azerbaijan National Academy of Sciences and professor.

Ibrahim Ibrahimov – Renowned mathematician, academician, and professor.

=== Literature ===
Mikayil Mushfig – Celebrated Azerbaijani poet.

Samad Vurgun - Azerbaijani and Soviet poet, dramatist, public figure.

Ahmad Javad – Azerbaijani poet and writer, author of the lyrics for the "Hymn of Azerbaijan."

Afat Gurbanov – Doctor of philological sciences and professor.

Ilyas Afandiyev – People's Writer of Azerbaijan.

Avaz Sadig – Azerbaijani Soviet writer.

Ismayil Shykhly – Azerbaijani writer.

Suleyman Rahimov - Azerbaijani and Soviet writer, novelist, prosaist and politician.

=== Law ===
Ramin Gurbanov – Azerbaijani lawyer, current president of the European Commission for the Efficiency of Justice (CEPEJ) of the Council of Europe, serving as a judge at the Baku Court of Appeal and academic leader in legal studies.

=== Composers ===
Said Rustamov - Azerbaijani composer, conductor and pedagogue.

Three of the 11 presidents of the Azerbaijan National Academy of Sciences—Yusif Mammadaliyev (2 times), Zahid Khalilov, and Hasan Abdullayev—as well as five vice-presidents—Heydar Huseynov, Samad Vurgun, Zahid Khalilov, Alisohbat Sumbatzade, and Isa Habibbeyli—are graduates of the university.

== Student life ==
=== Student unions ===
- Meh Literary Association
- ASPU Turkish Student Management Council
- ASPU Public Union of Educational Volunteers
- ASPU Student Union Committee
- ASPU Student Youth Organization
- ASPU UNESCO club
- ASPU Enactus club
- ASPU New club

== International relations ==
On May 12–14, 2007, the Azerbaijan State Pedagogical University hosted an International Conference on "Teacher Training Policy and Problems" together with the Hacettepe University of the Republic of Turkey.

ASPU held a presentation on 21–24 April 2009 at the conference on "Building Civilizations through Education" organized by European Teacher Education Network (ETEN) at the Ege University of Turkey and was elected a member of the European Teacher Education Network.

On 2 February 2009, Scientific Cooperation Protocol between ASPU and Mehmet Akif Ersoy University of the Republic of Turkey was signed.

On 16–18 May 2010, ASPU and Hacettepe University jointly organized a conference titled "Symposium II of International Teacher Training Policy and Problems” in Ankara.

On 31 May 2011, the Babesh-Bolyai University of Romania and ASPU signed a cooperation agreement. By the decision of the Scientific Council of Azerbaijan State Pedagogical University rector of Babesh-Bolyai University, professor A.Margaya was awarded "Honorary Doctor" by ASPU.

A Mandate was signed between the Azerbaijan State Pedagogical University and the Qafqaz University to join the E-NOTES (European Computer Driving License) project on 7 February 2012.

On 1 June 2012, a Scientific and Technical Cooperation Agreement was signed between the ASPU and the Radio and Electronics Institute of Russian Academy of Sciences.

On 22 June 2012, a Protocol on academic cooperation was signed between ASPU and Hacettepe University of the Republic of Turkey.

On September 14, 2012, ASPU signed a cooperation agreement with the Kazakh National Pedagogical University named after Abay.

Roger Bruce Myerson, a member of the Second Baku International Humanitarian Forum, Professor of the University of Chicago, Nobel Prize winner in Economics, met with the faculty and staff of ASPU on October 5, 2012.

A Memorandum of Understanding on scientific cooperation was signed between Azerbaijan State Pedagogical University (ASPU) and Tashkent State Pedagogical University (TSPU) named after Nizami Ganjavi on December 28, 2013, in Baku.

== Exchange programs ==
=== Erasmus+ ===
The Erasmus+ exchange program at Azerbaijan State Pedagogical University (ASPU) facilitates exchanges for students, academics, and administrative staff with partner universities. Participating in the Erasmus+ program allows students to enhance their communication and language skills while acquiring valuable experiences relevant to their future endeavors. This program is open to bachelor's and master's level students, as well as academic and administrative staff, who can engage in exchanges ranging from one to two semesters. Eligibility requires enrollment in a higher education institution, with students typically in at least their second year of study and pursuing a field related to their university major. ASPU's Erasmus+ partnerships include collaborations with institutions such as Copenhagen University College (UCC) in Denmark, Vytautas Magnus University, and Dunarea de Jos University of Galati in Romania. Participants in the ASPU Erasmus+ exchange program receive scholarships covering travel and living expenses, along with exemptions from tuition fees, registration, exams, and access to university facilities during their exchange period.

=== Mevlana Exchange Program (MEP) ===
The Mevlana Exchange Program (MEP) facilitates student and teacher exchanges between higher educational institutions in Turkey and those outside the country. Named after the renowned Persian-speaking poet and philosopher Mevlana Celaleddin Rumi, this program aims to foster mutual academic enrichment among partner universities. Participating students can engage in teaching for one to two semesters, while teachers can conduct academic activities for a period ranging from two weeks to three months at Turkish higher education institutions, provided bilateral agreements are in place. Eligible participants include preparatory, bachelor's, master's, and doctoral students, as well as teaching staff from both domestic and foreign higher education institutions. Students must meet certain academic criteria, including minimum grade point averages, while teachers are required to dedicate a minimum of six hours to academic activities during their exchange period. MEP covers transportation, accommodation, medical insurance, and other essential expenses for participants, with additional grants determined by the Executive Board of the Higher Education Council of Turkey. Participating universities, including Ataturk University, Gazi University, and Ege University, collaborate to ensure a balanced exchange of students and uphold program standards. Exchange students must adhere to the regulations of the host university and fulfill any language proficiency requirements. Overall, the Mevlana Exchange Program fosters international cooperation and academic mobility, contributing to the global exchange of knowledge and ideas.

== Gallery ==
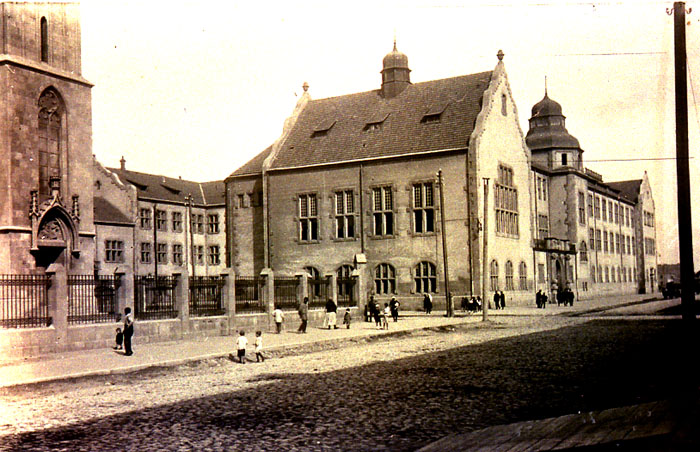

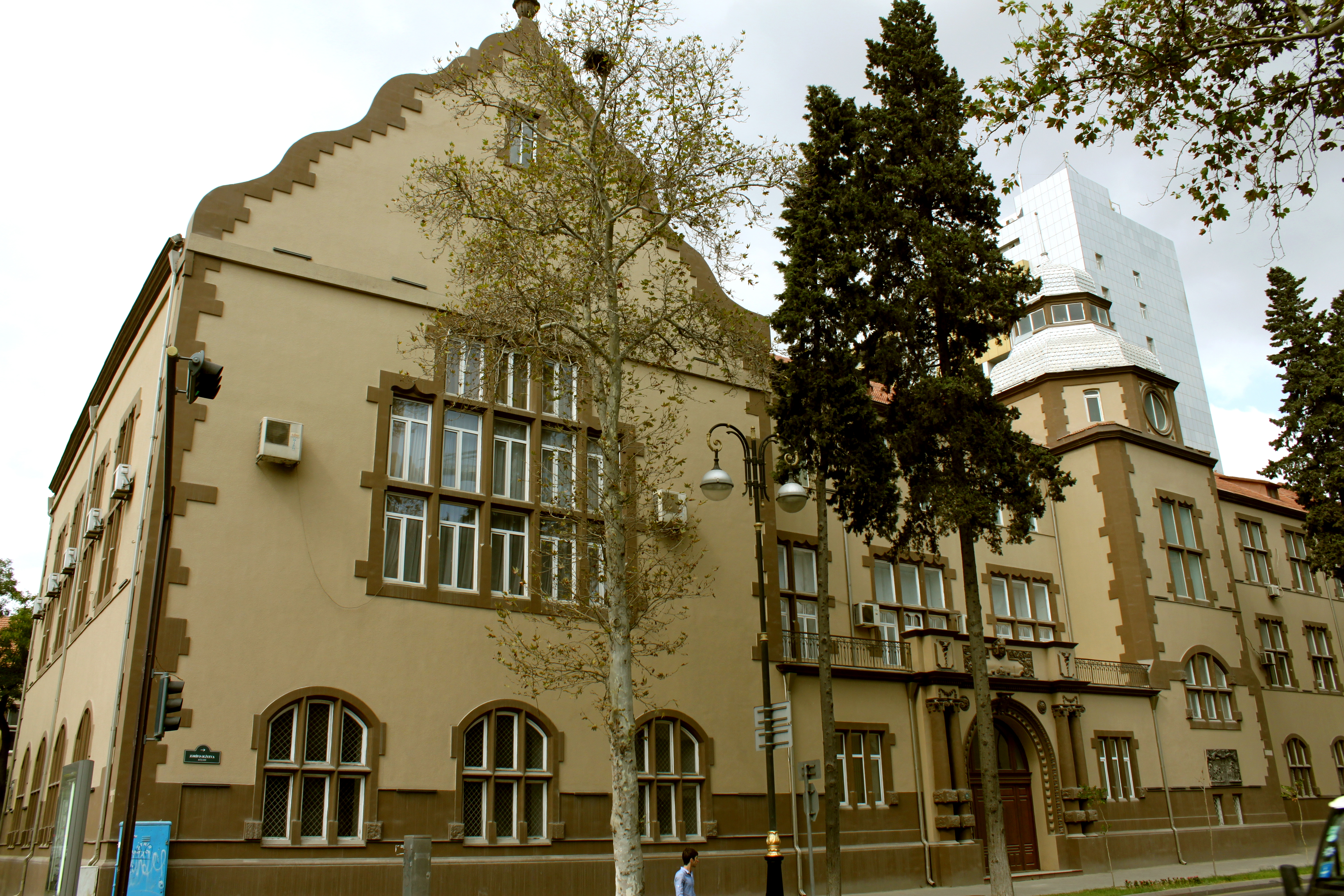

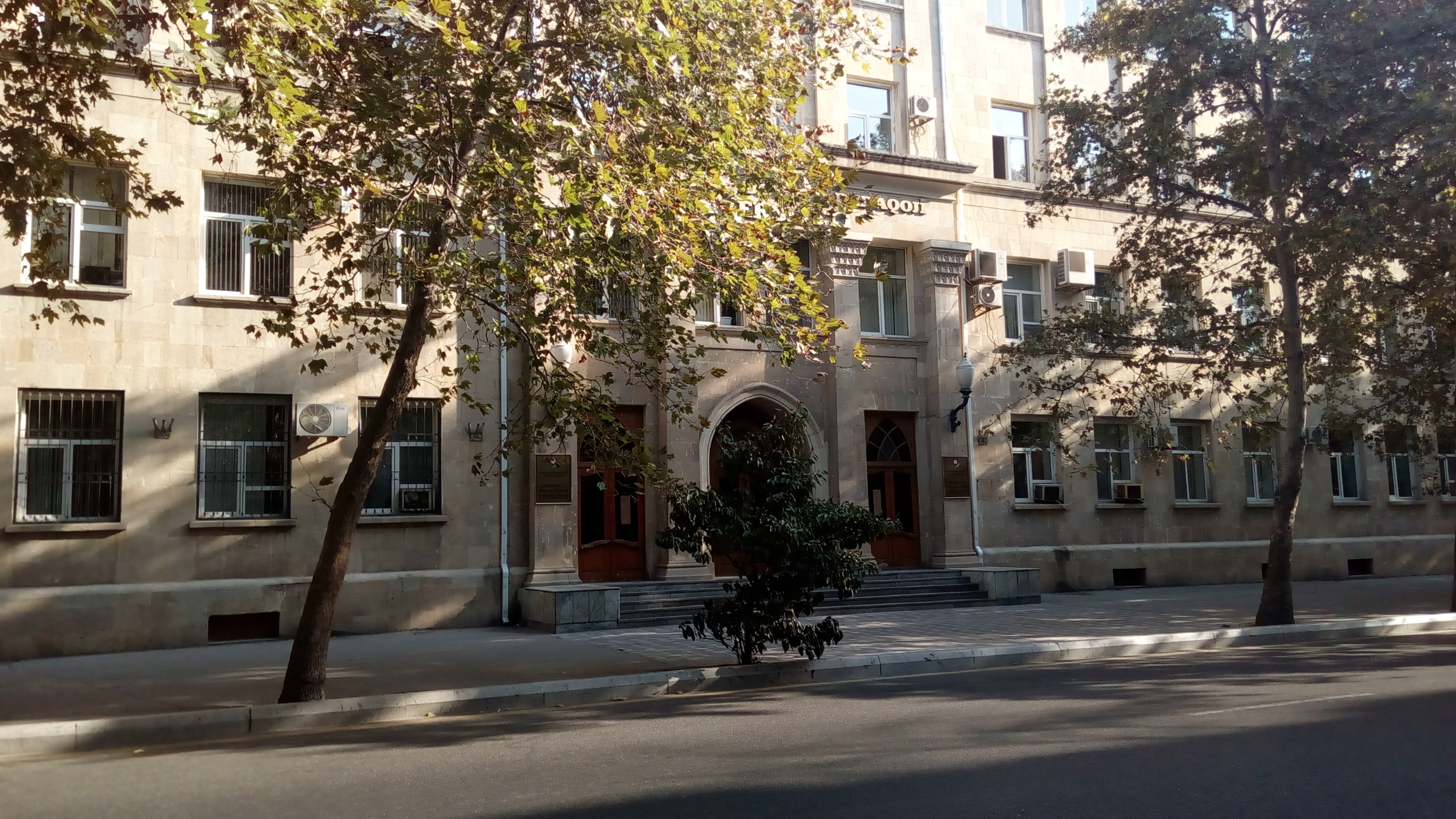

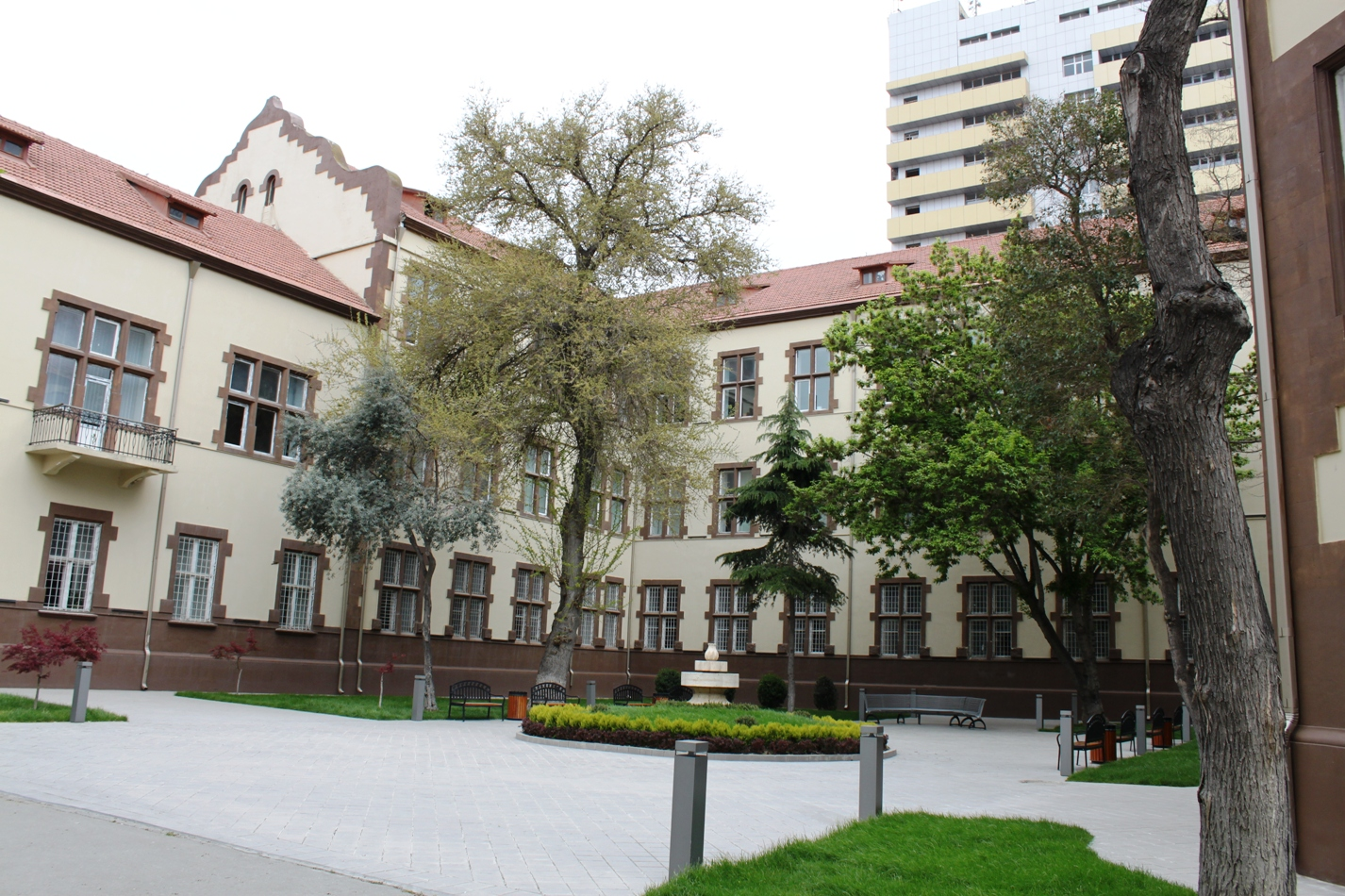

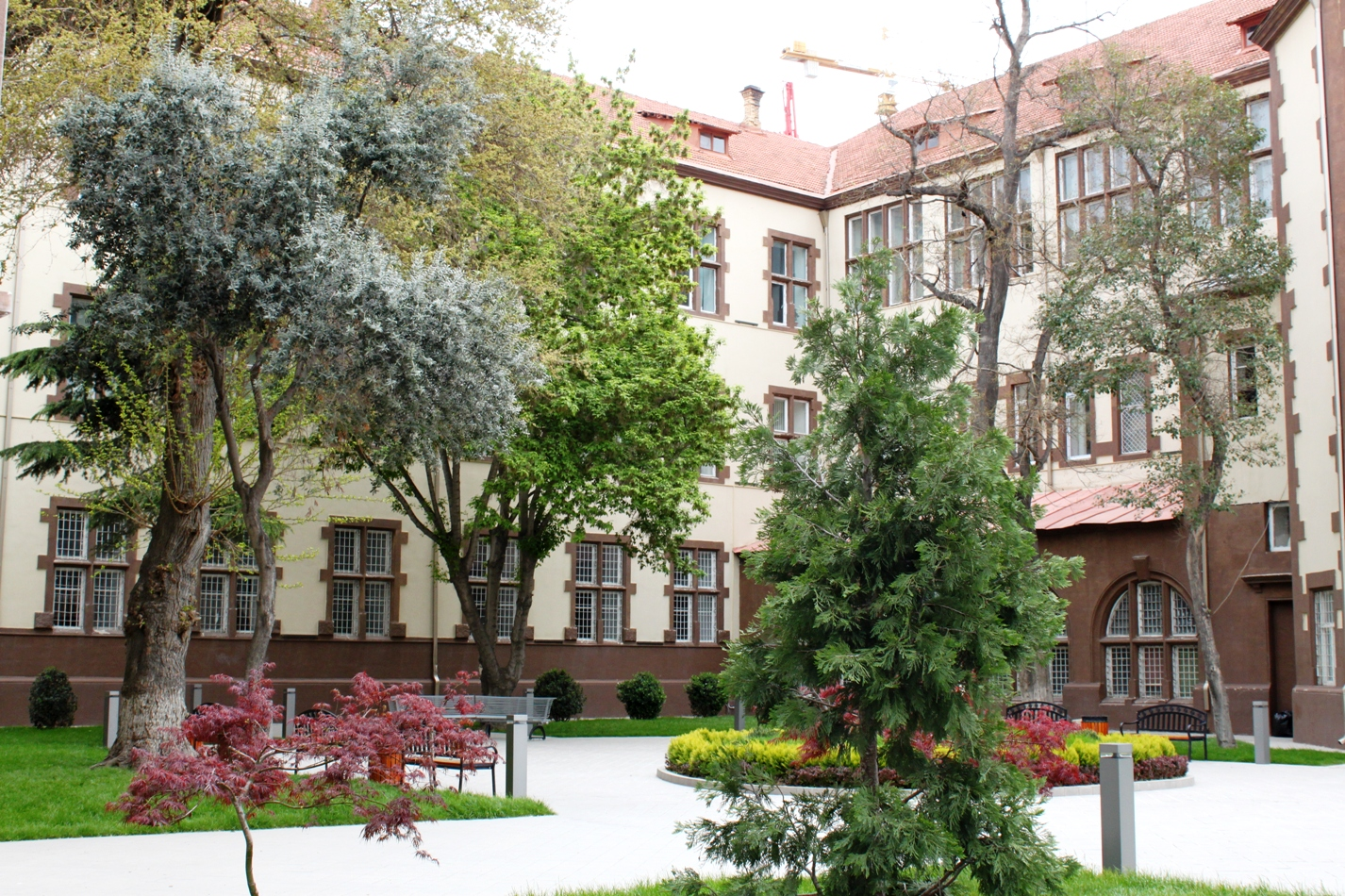

== See also ==
List of universities in Baku

Education in Azerbaijan

Azerbaijan State Pedagogical College

Azerbaijan State Pedagogical University 100th anniversary medal
