= Mammad =

Mammad (Azerbaijani: Məmməd, lit. 'Mohammed') is a given name commonly found in the Azerbaijan. See the article "Muhammad" for other variants of the name. It gives rise to the patronymic surname Mammadov. Notable people with the name include:

- Mammad Alakbarov (1899–1959), Soviet Azerbaijani bureaucrat and pedagogue
- Mammad Araz (1933–2004), Azerbaijani poet
- Mammad Gurbanov (1911–1979), Soviet Azerbaijani bureaucrat
- Mammad Hasan Hajinski, Azerbaijani architect and statesman
- Mammad Hasan agha Javanshir, Military leader
- Mammad Huseyn, Azerbaijani poet
- Mammad Khalilov, Azerbaijani politician
- Mammad Maharramov (1919–1977), Azerbaijani Red Army lieutenant
- Mammad Mammadov (1920–1945), Azerbaijani soldier
- Mammad Yaqubov (born 1941), Azerbaijani scientist
- Mammad Yusif Jafarov, Azerbaijani statesman
