= Azerbaijan State Pedagogical College =

Educational institution under Azerbaijan State Pedagogical University

- Type: Public
- Established: 1919
- Location: Baku, Azerbaijan; 40°22′50.75″N 49°49′16.15″E
- Campus: Urban
- Website: https://adpk.edu.az/index.php/az/
- Location in Baku, Azerbaijan Azerbaijan State Pedagogical College (Azerbaijan)

Azerbaijan State Pedagogical College (formerly known as M.A. Sabir Baku Pedagogical Technical School) is a secondary specialized educational institution under the Azerbaijan State Pedagogical University.

== History ==
The college was established in 1919.

From December 1990 to April 2016, Azerbaijan State Pedagogical College was led by Nurlana Müzəffər qızı Əliyeva. During her tenure, coinciding with the period of the restoration of Azerbaijan's independence, significant reforms were implemented. In 1993, the college expanded its academic offerings to include "Social Pedagogy" and "National Ethics and Islamic Studies," reflecting the evolving needs of society and the preparation of future professionals. A scientific-practical conference was held in May 1995 on "The Scientific and Pedagogical Foundations and Practical Issues of Comprehensive Approaches to Personality Development," where significant ideas and discussions were presented.

In 1997, a republic-wide scientific and practical conference dedicated to primary school teachers was held at the college. This reflected the growing recognition of the institution's pedagogical achievements and its rising status as an exemplary educational institution. In 1999, the college celebrated its 80th anniversary. In a congratulatory message from the late President Heydar Aliyev, the college's role in the development of national education was highlighted: "The Baku Pedagogical Technical School has made invaluable contributions to the development of Azerbaijani education by providing high-quality pedagogical staff for the country’s schools."

=== History of Baku Industry-Pedagogical College (1929–2016) ===
1929-1967:

Baku Industry-Pedagogical College was initially established in 1921 as an evening school and later became the All-Union Baku Industry Technical School in 1929, according to a decree from the Soviet Government. The college provided training in various technical fields relevant to the Soviet Union's machine engineering and oil industries.

1967-1991:

In 1967, the All-Union Baku Industry Technical School was renamed the All-Union Baku Industry-Pedagogical Technical School. During this period, the institution offered specialized training in fields like welding technology, civil and industrial construction, automotive repair, and agricultural mechanization. International students from countries such as Bangladesh, Cuba, Vietnam, Syria, Yemen, and Afghanistan also attended the college.

1991-2016:

In 1991, following the dissolution of the Soviet Union, the institution was renamed Baku Industry-Pedagogical Technical School under the Azerbaijan Ministry of Education. A branch was also opened in the Quba region. By 2000, several departments from the Ganja Household Service College merged with Baku Industry-Pedagogical Technical School. In 2010, the institution was rebranded as Baku Industry-Pedagogical College.

Post-2016:

In 2016, the college merged with Azerbaijan State Pedagogical University, continuing its educational activities under the name Azerbaijan State Pedagogical College. During the 2017–2018 academic year, the college participated in various international seminars and collaborated with institutions like Bilkent University in Turkey. The college also developed several professional and social skills training programs in collaboration with the Ministry of Education and other local organizations. In 2018 and 2019, the college was recognized as one of the best in Azerbaijan in a survey conducted by the "School Corner" website.

== Programs ==
- Physical Education Teaching
- Preschool Education and Care
- Inclusive Education
- Family and Home Education
- Social Work
- Computer Networks and Network Administration
- Painting
- Cultural and Mass Event Organizer
- Decorative Applied Arts

== Contingent ==
The college has a total of 4169 students in full-time and part-time departments. It is also the first college to implement the "Moodle" teaching management system.

There are 260 teachers, including 1 Doctor of Sciences, Professor, 12 Candidates of Sciences, 14 Associate Professors, and 18 PhD students.
