= Azerbaijan State Pedagogical University 100th anniversary medal =

The Jubilee medal of "100th Anniversary of Azerbaijan State Pedagogical University (1921-2021)"
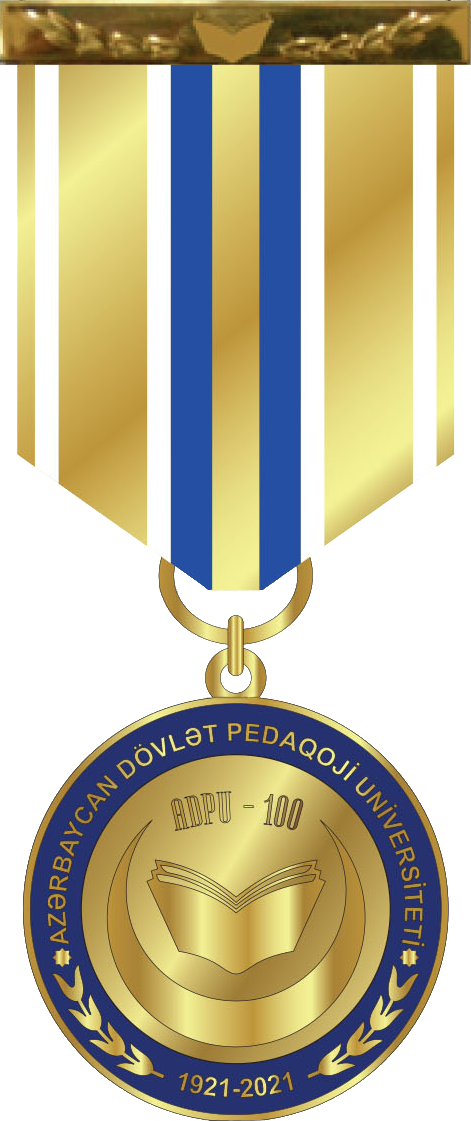
- Type: Medal
- Country: Azerbaijan
- Presented by: state
- Ribbon of the medal

The Jubilee medal of "100th Anniversary of Azerbaijan State Pedagogical University (1921-2021)” (Azerbaijani: Azərbaycan Dövlət Pedaqoji Universitetinin 100 illiyi (1921-2021)” Azərbaycan Respublikasının yubiley medalı) is a state award of Azerbaijan dedicated to the 100th anniversary of the establishment of Azerbaijan State Pedagogical University. The award was established on December 14, 2021, in accordance with the amendments to the “Law on Establishment of Orders and Medals of Azerbaijan''.

== Award description ==
The medal is made of bronze, coated with gold, and has a circular shape with a diameter of 36 mm. Its obverse side is contoured by inner and outer circles. Between these circles, at the top, the inscription “AZƏRBAYCAN DÖVLƏT PEDAQOJİ UNİVERSİTETİ” is displayed on a dark blue background, while at the bottom, the years “1921 – 2021” are inscribed. On either side of the years, wheat branches extend upwards, followed by an eight-pointed star. Within the inner circle, a composition is depicted on a golden background, featuring a crescent moon extending upwards and a book emblem symbolizing education at its center. Above this composition, the inscription “ADPU – 100” is engraved as a logo. The eight-pointed star, circle contours, crescent moon, book emblem, inscriptions, numbers, “ADPU – 100” logo, and wheat branches are all embossed in gold.

The reverse side of the medal features the inscription “ADPU – 100” in gold at the top. In the center, a relief engraving of the historical part of the main building of the institution designated by the relevant executive authority is depicted. At the bottom, the serial number of the medal is inscribed.

== Criteria for award ==
The “100th Anniversary of Azerbaijan State Pedagogical University (1921 - 2021)” Jubilee Medal of the Republic of Azerbaijan is awarded to individuals who have achieved significant accomplishments in the fields of science, education, and teacher training, as well as those who have made notable contributions to the development of these areas and actively participated in social and cultural development. This includes employees and former employees of the relevant executive authority designated by the relevant authority, graduates, and Azerbaijani citizens, foreign nationals, and stateless persons who have rendered exceptional services in implementing state policies in science, education, and international cooperation, as well as contributing to the progress of the designated institution.

== Awarding body ==
The awarding body is defined in accordance with Article 23, Clause 23 (Powers of the President) of the Constitution of Azerbaijan. The Minister of Education of Azerbaijan has been authorized to award the anniversary medal based on the Presidential decree dated 13 December 2021.

== The way of wearing ==
The “100th Anniversary of Azerbaijan State Pedagogical University (1921 - 2021)” Jubilee Medal is worn on the left side of the chest, following other orders and medals of the Republic of Azerbaijan.
