= Azerbaijan Teachers' Institute =

Organization for training teachers in Azerbaijan

Azerbaijan Teachers Institute
- Established: 2000
- Mission: To provide training, retraining and advanced training of teachers
- Address: Baku, Koroglu Rahimov str. The 874th quarter
- Location: Azerbaijan, Baku
- Coordinates: 40°24′14″N 49°51′29″E
- Interactive map of Azerbaijan Teachers Institute
- Website: www.ami.az

The Azerbaijan Teachers` Institute (Azerbaijani: Azərbaycan Müəllimlər İnstitutu) is a higher educational institution that provides training, retraining, and advanced training for teachers.

== Introduction ==
Since the 1920s, the People's Commissariat for Education has organized short courses (2–6 months long) for school teachers. In those years, the Commissariat decided to create home pedagogical technical schools. These technical schools (that involved 1500 teachers) were established in 1927 with the purpose of training teachers with secondary special education.

On October 1, 1929, in accordance with the Decision of the Board of the Branch of People's Commissariat for Education of the Azerbaijan SSR dated July 13, 1929, the Azerbaijan Institute of Advanced Studies of the Personnel of Public Education was opened. The Institute included home pedagogical technical schools, a former pedagogical faculty, and correspondence methodical courses. Initially, the Institute was only engaged in the retraining of pedagogical personnel, which was conducted through correspondence and short-term courses. The retraining was covered by educators of all categories.

In 1939, the Institute for Advanced Studies of the Personnel of Public Education was replaced by the Republican Institute for Advanced Studies of Teachers.

In 1972, it was also reorganized into the Azerbaijan Central Institute for Advanced Studies of Teachers. By the decision of the Council of Ministers of Azerbaijan SSR No. 398 dated October 4, 1989, improvement was sought for the system of advanced training of the public education employees. The Azerbaijan Central Institute of Advanced Training for Teachers was reorganized into the Institute of Advanced Training and Retraining of Teachers. It was given the status of higher education I category. The Institute moved to the cathedral system and faculties were organized for the implementation of work on advanced training.

In 2000, by the Decree of the President of Azerbaijan No. 349, the Azerbaijan Institute of Teachers was established with 12 branches in the Nakhichevan, Ganja, Sumgait, Mingechevir, Gazakh, Shamakhi, Quba, Salyan, Jalilabad, Agjabedi, Sheki, Zagatala and with a training and advisory center in Lankaran. In a short time, the Nakhchivan branch has become an independent Institution of teachers.

== Structure ==
The Azerbaijan Teachers` Institute includes faculties such as Pedagogy and Philology, Further training and improvement of teaching staff, Psychology, Literature and teaching methods, Azerbaijani language and its teaching methods, Foreign languages, Natural sciences and methods of their teaching, Mathematics and teaching methods, Social Sciences, Information Technologies and methods of their teaching, Education management and vocational training, Methods of primary and preschool education and Civil Defense, Basics of medical knowledge and physical education

The Azerbaijan Teachers` Institute (ATI) and its branches operate in the following areas:

- Primary teacher training (bachelor's degree)
- Professional development of teaching staff
- Retraining of teaching staff
- Improving teachers

Currently, 1079 employees work in the branches, of which 533 are faculty members. The Institute has 260 employees, of which 119 are faculty members.

The institute has 3 faculties, 12 departments, a fundamental library, and a computer center.

== International relations ==
On August 27, 2011, a memorandum of understanding was signed between Azerbaijan Teachers` Institute and the Pakistani University of Punjab. Within the framework of the MoU conferences, training, visits, seminars, etc. are organized, the students of the institutions can exchange their experiences.

In the same year, on June 23, an academic agreement on organizing teacher and student exchange on training, implementing programs and joining international training was signed between the Azerbaijan Teachers` Institute and Atatürk University of Turkey with 43,000 students.

== See also ==
- Azerbaijan University of Languages
- Azerbaijan State Pedagogical University
