= Kəlbəhüseynli =

- Municipality
- Location within Azerbaijan
- Coordinates: 39°05′03″N 48°39′27″E
- Country: Azerbaijan
- Rayon: Masally

Population
  - Total: 1,231
- Time zone: UTC+4 (AZT)
  - Summer (DST): UTC+5 (AZT)

Kəlbəhüseynli (also, Kelbaguseynli, Kel’baguseynli, and Kyal’bi-Guseynly) is a village and municipality in the Masally Rayon of Azerbaijan. It has a population of 1,231.

== Notable Natives ==
- Rahid Ulusel (born 1954), scientist
