= Rahid Ulusel =

Azerbaijani professor

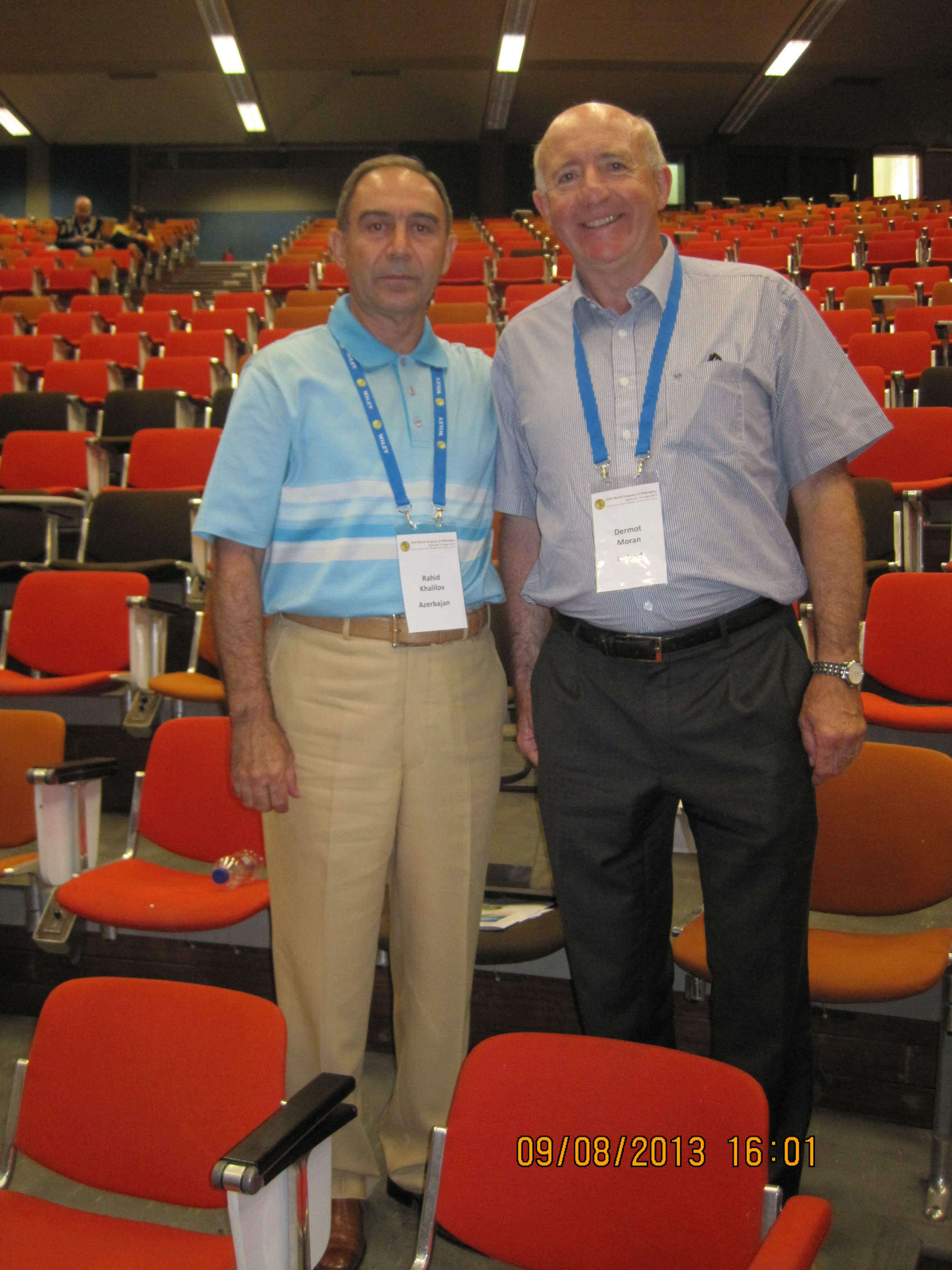
- Born: 13 August 1954; Kəlbəhüseynli, Masally District, Azerbaijan
- Education: Azerbaijan State Pedagogical University
- Occupation: Professor at Azerbaijan National Academy of Sciences

Rahid Ulusel (full name Rahid Suleyman Khalilov) is an Azerbaijani scientist, senior researcher at the Azerbaijan National Academy of Sciences, and professor at Western University (2005–2007).

== Biography ==
Rahid Ulusel was born in Kəlbəhüseynli village of Masally District of the Republic of Azerbaijan on 13 August 1954. Childhood of Ulusel is very vague, though its known that he lost his father when he was around 15-years-old and was brought up by his mother. Graduated Azerbaijan State Pedagogical University. The topic of his PhD thesis is "Contemporary Azerbaijani Philosophical Lyrics". The total number of Ulusel's printed scientific publications is 215.

The valuable works of Ulusel are about the actual problems of philosophy, aesthetics, culturology, philology and criticism. They were published in Azerbaijan and abroad. Ulusel is a member of the Union of Azerbaijani Writers, the Dissertation Council of the Institute of Philosophy of ANAS, the International Federation of Philosophical Societies, vice-president of the Biocosmology Association for the Middle East. Rahid Ulusel represented Azerbaijan at several international congresses on humanitarian sciences (US, Sweden, Greece, Korea, etc.).

== Scientific works ==
- Contemporary Azerbaijani Philosophical Lyrics (in Russian). Baku: Science Press, 1985
- Rasul Rza's poetry (in Azerbaijani). Baku: Yazichi, 1985
- The National Self-Understanding and Geostrategy in the Age of Globalization (in Azerbaijani). Baku: Azerbaijan National Encyclopedia, 2002
- The US-Turkey-Azerbaijan Relationship and the Russian Philosophical and Political Approaches to It (in Turkish) // 2023 Futurological Journal, Ankara, 2003, December.
- The Silk Road of Cultures (in Azerbaijani). Baku: Education Press, 2003
- Culture and Techno civilization (in Azerbaijani). Baku: Azerbaijan National Encyclopedia, 2003
- Globalization and Turkic Civilization (in Azerbaijani). Baku: Chashioglu Press, 2005
- Globalization and the Philosophy of Harmony (in Azerbaijani). Baku: Science Press, 2005
- The Philosophy of Harmony in the Cultures of Islamic East and Western Renaissance // The Problems of Eastern Philosophy (in Russian), 2005–2006, No. 1-2
- Civilization as a New Scientific Field // Azerbaijan in the World, 2006, No. 1
- Globalization and Turkic Civilization // Azerbaijan in the World, 2006, No. 1
- The Universe is the Cell, the Cell is the Universe (in Azerbaijani). Baku: Europe Press, 2008
- Paradigmal Rethinking of World Development towards Global Civilization // Proceedings of the XXII World Congress of Philosophy. Social and Political Philosophy, 2008, Volume 50, p. 321–330
- Homo-universalism // Third Global Civilization World Congress (Web Conference) (in English and Chinese).
- Turks in the Civilizational Evolution of Eurasia // Problems of Art and Culture. International Scientific Journal, Baku, 2009, No.4 (30)
- Essayistic (in Azerbaijani). Baku: Europe Press, 2009
- Contemporary Azerbaijani Criticism (in Azerbaijani). Baku: Science Press, 2009
- Rhythms of Life and Thought (in Azerbaijani). Baku: Chashioglu Press, 2009
- Master Rasul Rza. Philosophy and Poetry: Their Synthesis in the Classics of World and Azerbaijan (in Azerbaijani). Baku: Letterpress, 2010
- Harmony Philosophy and the New World Order Principles // ICCEES VIII World Congress. Eurasia: Prospects for Wider Cooperation. Abstracts. 2010, 26–31 July, Stockholm, Sweden, p. 129
- Heydar Aliyev and the International Relations of Azerbaijan: from Politics to Culture (in Azerbaijani). Baku: Ideal-Print, 2010
- Homo-universalism as an Integral Idea of the Multi civilizational World // International Journal of Arts and Sciences (IJAS), 2011, Vol. 4, No.23
- Globalization and the Philosophic-Aesthetical Problems of the Contemporary Literature (in Azerbaijani). Baku: Qoliaf Group Press, 2012
- Metaphilosophically Approach to Harmonic-World- System / XXIII World Congress of Philosophy, Philosophy as an Inquiry and a Way of Life. Athens, 4 – 10 August 2013, School of Philosophy, National & Kapodistrian University of Athens, Greece, p. 338

== Awards and prizes ==
- Medal of the Ministry of Education of former USSR (1990)
- Grant of the President of the Republic of Azerbaijan (2009)
