= Mammet =

Mammet may refer to:

- Mammes of Caesarea (c. 259–275), Christian martyr from Caesaria
- Mammet Orazmuhammedow (born 1986), Turkmen footballer

== See also ==
- Mamet, a surname
