= European Teacher Education Network =

The European Teacher Education Network (ETEN) was founded in 1988 by a group of teacher-educators who found it imperative to promote cooperation and international collaboration in research and development by exchanging students and staff. The overall aim was providing opportunities for professional development, research and publication, and promoting knowledge and understanding of the history, culture, values and traditions of the member countries.

In 2009 ETEN comprises a network of nearly 60 institutions of higher education from 20 countries, mainly European. ETEN seeks and cooperates with partners outside Europe.

ETEN publishes the Journal of the European Teacher Education Network (JETEN) in electronic format and the Proceedings of the annual conference, also in electronic format. The standard working language of ETEN is English.

ETEN works to:

- promote opportunities for exchange and/or visits of individual and/or groups of students as part of their programmes of study (inclusive of teaching experience, practical training, curriculum work and research).
- promote opportunities for exchange and/or visits of staff members in relation to student education, teaching, school development, curriculum development and research.
- promote opportunities within teacher and social educator education programmes and school practice to incorporate comparative and intercultural perspectives on education.
- promote opportunities for cross-national and international collaboration in research and development.
- provide opportunities for professional staff development.
- disseminate the work of ETEN in a wider educational context.

== TIG - Thematic Interest Groups ==
ETEN, like the Internet, is a network without a hierarchy but with a purpose: besides promoting exchange of students and staff it focuses around Thematic Interest Groups (TIGs). The strength of the network is based on these groups of common interests whose activities depend heavily on the TIG leaders.

- Arts Education
- Democracy
- Early Learners
- Educational Technology
- Internationalisation
- Mathematics Education
- Myths, Fairy Tales and Legends in Education
- Physical Education
- Reflective Practice
- Religion and Cultural Education
- Science Education
- Special Needs
- Technology Teaching & Learning
- Urban Education

== Annual Conference ==
The ETEN annual conference is, in essence, organized around each TIG, whose leader is responsible for accepting papers, organizing presentations, and moderating discussions.
