= Zahid Khalilov =

Azerbaijani mathematician

Zahid Ismayil oghlu Khalilov (Azerbaijani: Zahid İsmayıl oğlu Xəlilov, 14 January 1911, Sarachly – 4 February 1974, Baku) was an Azerbaijani mathematician (professor since 1946) and engineer. Being the founder of Azerbaijani functional analysis school, he was elected president of the Azerbaijan Mathematical Society. Khalilov solved the boundary value problem for polyharmonic equations, proposed abstract generalizations of singular integral operators and made some other contributions.

In 1955, Khalilov became a member of Azerbaijan National Academy of Sciences. In 1957–1959 he was its vice chairman and chairman in 1961–1967. A street in Baku is named after him.

== Researches ==
Khalilov was the first to consider the abstract equation with an operator satisfying the condition Q^{2} = I, within the framework of normed rings. The associated theory was a direct treatment of the singular integral equations theory with continuous coefficients within the subject of an abstract normed ring. Khalilov had also translated the Noether's theorem to the case of abstract singular equations in a normed ring R ux + vS(x) + T(x) = y and gave a general theory of regularizers.

Khalilov also investigated the problems of subterranean hydromechanics applied in development of oil and gas deposits.
