= Mammad Alakbarov =

Soviet Azerbaijani bureaucrat and pedagogue (1899–1959)

- Məmməd Ələkbərov; Мәммәд Әләкбәров
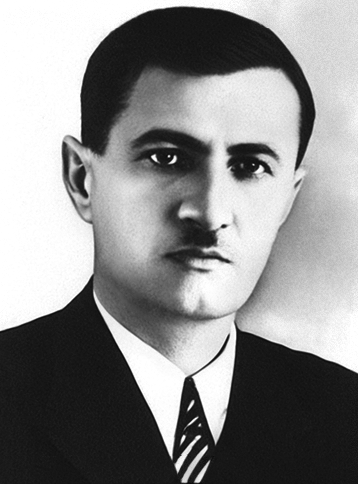

Minister of Culture of the Azerbaijan SSR
- In office 18 April 1953 – 1955
- Preceded by: Position established
- Succeeded by: Mammad Gurbanov

Deputy Chairman of the Council of Ministers of the Azerbaijan SSR
- In office 1952–1953

Minister of Education of the Azerbaijan SSR
- In office 1947 – March 1952
- Preceded by: Mirza Ibrahimov
- Succeeded by: Mehdi Mehdizade

Personal details
- Born: 1899; Lankaran, Baku Governorate, Caucasus Viceroyalty
- Died: 7 February 1959 (aged 59–60); Baku, Azerbaijan SSR, Soviet Union
- Political party: Communist Party of the Soviet Union
- Education: Azerbaijan State Pedagogical Institute
- Awards: Order of the Red Banner of Labour

Mammad Hamid oghlu Alakbarov (Azerbaijani: Məmməd Həmid oğlu Ələkbərov, 1899 — 7 February 1959) was a Soviet Azerbaijani bureaucrat and pedagogue who was the first Minister of Culture of Azerbaijan (1953–1955), Deputy Chairman of the Council of Ministers of the Azerbaijan SSR (1952–1953) and Minister of Education of the Azerbaijan SSR (1947–1952).

== Biography ==
Mammad Alakbarov was born in 1899 in Lankaran. After the death of his father Mashadi Hamid in 1909, he lived under the care of his relatives, studied at the "Behjat" Russian-Tatar (Azerbaijani) school in Lankaran, but was unable to complete his education.

Until 1920, he worked in his cousin's fish farm. After the establishment of the Soviet government in Azerbaijan, he was sent to the 1st grade school in Astrakhan-Bazar as a teacher after completing a teacher training course. In 1921, he started working at school No. 5 in Lankaran. Alakbarov studied at the Pedagogical Institute in Baku in 1923–1926, and as a specialist with higher education he taught in Balaxanı, Bashkechid region of Borchaly Uyezd. He worked as the head of the Public Education Department of Guba district.

In 1928, Alakbarov worked in the Office of the People's Commissariat of Education of the Azerbaijan SSR, and worked as Methodist, responsible executive, deputy head of the department of primary and secondary schools. In 1937 he was a researcher at the Azerbaijan State Institute of Scientific Research Schools, at the same time in 1939 he worked as a deputy director of the Institute of Teacher Training, and in 1941 he was transferred to this position.

Alakbarov was admitted to the Communist Party of the Soviet Union in 1943. The same year, he became director of the Azerbaijan State Pedagogical Institute. He became deputy commissioner of public education of the Azerbaijan SSR a year later. In 1947, he was appointed Minister of Public Education of the Azerbaijan SSR, held this position for five years, and then served as Deputy Chairman of the Council of Ministers of the Azerbaijan SSR. From 1953 he was the Minister of Culture of the Azerbaijan SSR.

Alakbarov received the degree of Candidate of Philological Sciences in 1950, was the author of articles on the methods of teaching the Azerbaijani language and literature. His books "Writing in incomplete secondary and high schools" (1940), "Methods of reading in primary school" (1940) and others were published.

Mammad Alakbarov was repeatedly elected a member of the Central Committee of the Communist Party of Azerbaijan, a deputy of the second and fourth convocations of the Supreme Soviet of the Azerbaijan SSR. He was awarded the honorary title of "Honored School Teacher of the Azerbaijan SSR", was awarded the Order of the Red Banner of Labour and medals.

Mammad Alakbarov died on 7 February 1959, after a long and serious illness.
