= Mammad Huseyn =

Azerbaijani poet

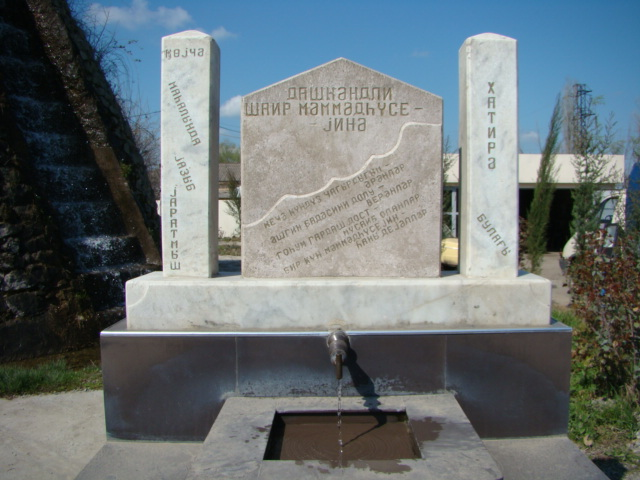
A fountain erected in memory of the poet Mammad Huseyn in Yeni Daşkənd village of Barda region

Mammad Huseyn (Azerbaijani: Məmməd Huseyin) (born Novruzov Mammad Huseyn Hasan oglu; 1800–1880, in Dashkand, Nor Bayazet district) was a 19th-century Azerbaijani poet.

== About ==
Huseyn was born in the village of Dashkand in the Goycha district. He received no education. The poet's older brother Ali received eight years of spiritual education in Ardabil and Isfahan. Although Huseyn's father was a carpenter, he devoted his entire life to the art of ashug. His father had a great influence on his becoming a poet.

He was a poet who could suddenly recite poetry. The "Poets" family living in Dashkand is connected with the poet's name and are members of his family tree. Huseyn had five sons – Karbalai Muhammad, Karbalai Asad, Abulfat, Ali and Khalil.

Huseyn visited the holy city of Karbala with his son Muhammad. It is said that he was tall, slender, and large. Thick eyebrows gave him a special charm. He was engaged in agriculture and cattle breeding.

== Death ==
Huseyn died in his native village of Dashkand in 1880 as a result of a snake bite.

== Creativity ==
In addition to his famous "Epic of Love", he wrote hundreds of poems written in the form of verses, couplets, tajnis, mukhammas and divani. His poems were very popular in the form of Divani, was constantly persecuted for writing satires on high-ranking officials at the time. Many religious poems and laments of the poet Huseyn are recited by mourners in Shirvan and Mugan. The phrase "Let me tell you" is used by almost everyone in Azerbaijan. In one of his quartets, Huseyn, who complains about his luck, his lover and his time, says in his poems:

İgidin dönməsin əhdi,

Yana çevrilməsin təxdi,

Məmməd Hüseynin bəxdi,

Yatıb, oyanmaz, oyanmaz.

He is one of the prominent artists of the 19th century among Goycha ashugs and folk poets. His poems have been published in many books and textbooks. The first written information about the poet can be found in F. Gasimzadeh's book History of Azerbaijani Literature of the 19th Century, published in 1956. Ahliman Akhundov's book Researches on the Oral Folk Literature of Azerbaijan, published in 1961, was also given in the article entitled Outstanding Ashugs Who Grew Up in the 19th Century. Tarlan Goychali's book Goycha Ashug School (1998) also contains extensive information about the poet and several poems (pp. 28–37). Huseyn Ismayilov's book Goycha Ashugs and Folk Poets (2006) provides extensive information about the poet's poems and life (pp. 173–301). His selected poems "Sleep does not wake up, do not wake up" (2005), "Let me tell you" (2006), "Fountain of light" (2018) were published.
