= Mammad Gurbanov =

Soviet Azerbaijani bureaucrat (1911–1979)

- Məmməd Qurbanov

Minister of Culture of the Azerbaijan SSR
- In office 1955–1960
- Preceded by: Mammad Alakbarov
- Succeeded by: Abdulla Bayramov
- In office 1963–1965
- Preceded by: Abdulla Bayramov
- Succeeded by: Rauf Hajiyev

Personal details
- Born: December 1911
- Died: 21 December 1979 (aged 67–68)
- Awards: Order of the Red Banner of Labour Order of the Badge of Honour

Mammad Gurban oghlu Gurbanov (Azerbaijani: Məmməd Qurban oğlu Qurbanov, December 1911 — 21 December 1979) was a Soviet Azerbaijani bureaucrat who was Minister of Culture of the Azerbaijan SSR, Chairman of the Cinematography Committee and Radio Information Committee under the Council of Ministers of the Azerbaijan SSR and First Secretary of the Baku City Party Committee.

== Biography ==
Mammad Gurbanov was born in December 1911. In 1929 he graduated from Baku railway school of factory apprenticeships. He started his career as a locksmith at the Kirovabad locomotive depot. In 1930–1935, Gurbanov studied at the Tbilisi Workers' Railway School, N. Narimanov Baku Industrial College, and was a cadet of the Military Pilots School. From 1935 to 1940 he worked as secretary of the Kirovabad City Komsomol Committee, chairman of the city Committee of Physical Culture and Sports, head of the city Department of Public Education, editor of the "Kirovabad Bolshevik" newspaper.

In March 1941, he was elected Second Secretary of the Vartashen District Party Committee, and in October of the same year, First Secretary. After graduating from the Higher Party School under the Central Committee of the Communist Party of the Soviet Union in 1949, Gurbanov was appointed head of the Propaganda and Agitation Department of the Baku Committee of the Communist Party of Azerbaijan, then Chairman of the Radio Information Committee under the Council of Ministers of the Azerbaijan SSR, Head of the Propaganda and Agitation Department of the Kirovabad Regional Party Committee.

In 1953, Gurbanov was elected secretary of the Baku City Party Committee, then first secretary. In 1955, he served as Deputy Minister of Culture of the Azerbaijan SSR, in 1955–1960 and 1963–1965, he served as Minister of Culture of the Azerbaijan SSR, and until 1979, he served as Deputy Chairman and Chairman of the Cinematography Committee under the Council of Ministers of the Azerbaijan SSR. He was elected a member of the Central Committee of the Communist Party of Azerbaijan, a deputy of the Supreme Soviet of the Azerbaijan SSR.

Gurbanov died on 21 December 1979.

== Awards ==
- Order of the Red Banner of Labour
- Order of the Badge of Honour

== Sources ==
- Ministry of Culture of the Republic of Azerbaijan
