= Mamed İbragimov =

Soviet wrestler

Medal record

Men's freestyle wrestling

Representing the Soviet Union

European Championships
| Silver medal – second place | 1974 Madrid | 68 kg |

Mamed Suleyman oglu İbragimov (Russian: Ибрагимов Мамед Сулейман-оглы; Azerbaijani: İbrahimov Məmməd Süleyman oğlu; born 21 March 1946, in Baku, Azerbaijan SSR) is a former Soviet wrestler.
