= Mamet =

Mamet may refer to:

- Clara Mamet (born 1994), American actress and musician; daughter of David Mamet
- David Mamet (born 1947), American playwright, essayist, screenwriter, and film director
- Milton Mamet, fictional character from the American television series The Walking Dead (portrayed by Dallas Roberts)
- Edham Mamet or Nag Mohammed (born 1975), Uyghur refugee
- Zosia Mamet (born 1988), American actress who has appeared in various television series; daughter of David Mamet
- Lynn Mamet, an American theatre director, playwright, screenwriter, and television producer; sister of David Mamet
- Noah Mamet (born 1969), United States Ambassador to Argentina

== See also ==
- Mamed
