= Elections in Azerbaijan =

After its independence from the Soviet Union, elections in Azerbaijan have frequently been affected by electoral fraud and other unfair election practices, such as holding opposition politicians as political prisoners. Since 1993, Heydar Aliyev and his son Ilham Aliyev have been continuously in power.

Political scientists characterize Azerbaijan as an electoral authoritarian regime. The ruling New Azerbaijan Party, headed by Ilham Aliyev, controls all the electoral commissions in Azerbaijan.

The President of Azerbaijan is elected for a seven-year term by the people; before a constitutional referendum changed this in 2009, the position was limited to two terms. The National Assembly (Milli Məclis) has 125 members. Before 2005, 100 members were elected for a five-year term in single-seat constituencies and 25 members were elected by proportional representation. Since 2005 all 125 members have been elected in single-seat constituencies. Azerbaijan is a one-party dominant state. The most recent parliamentary elections were held on Sunday, 1 September 2024. The most recent presidential election was held on Wednesday, 7 February 2024.

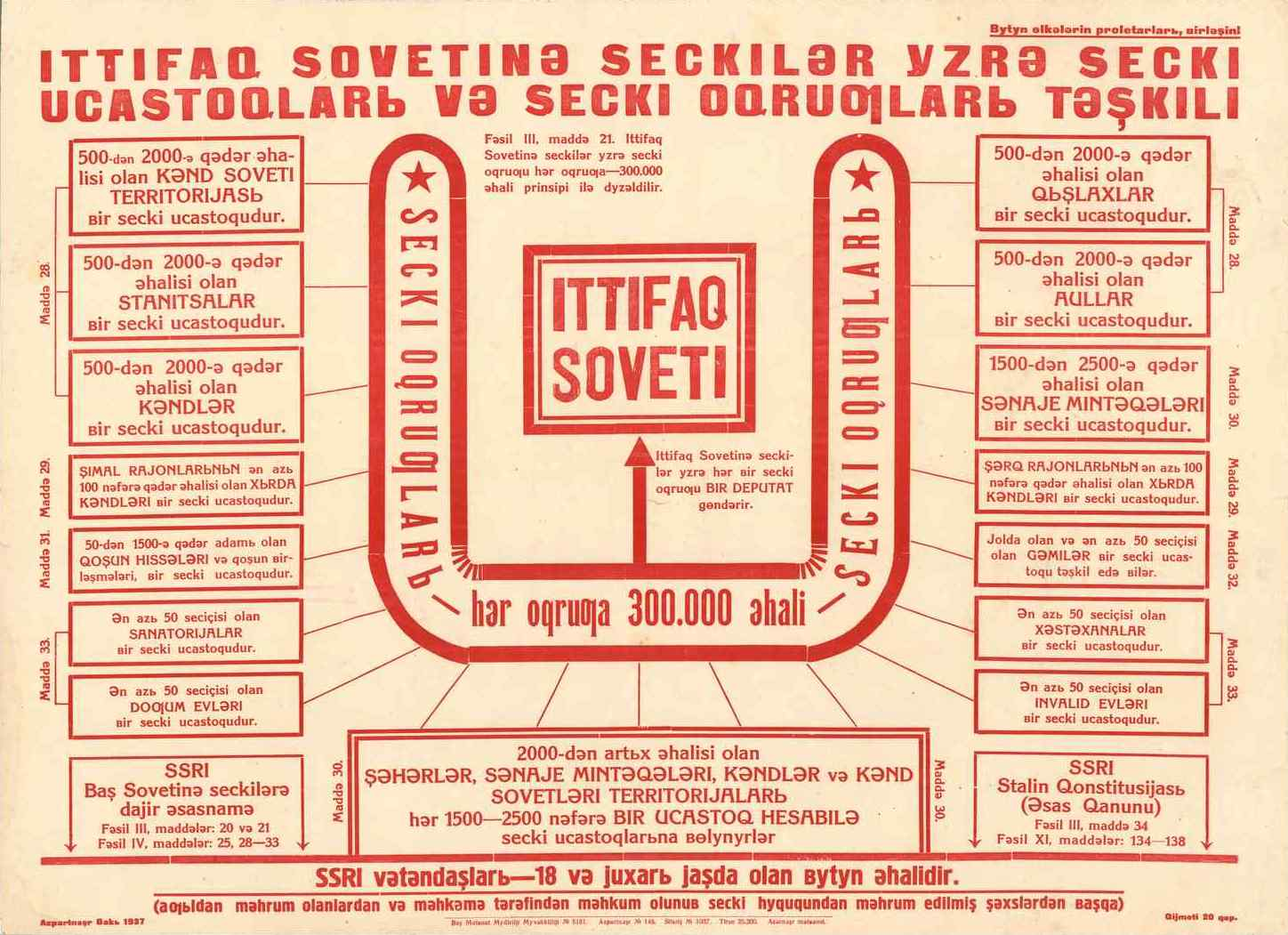
Soviet Azerbaijani election poster, 1937

== Latest elections ==
=== Presidential ===
Candidate	Party	Votes	%
Ilham Aliyev	New Azerbaijan Party	4,567,458	92.12
Zahid Oruj	Independent	107,632	2.17
Fazil Mustafa	Great Order Party	98,421	1.99
Qüdrat Hasanquliyev	Whole Azerbaijan Popular Front Party	85,411	1.72
Razi Nurullayev	National Front Party (Azerbaijan)	39,643	0.80
Elşad Musayev	Great Azerbaijan Party	32,885	0.66
Fuad Aliyev	Independent	26,517	0.53
Total		4,957,967	100.00

=== National Assembly ===
Party	Votes	%	Seats
New Azerbaijan Party	1,200,314	50.42	68
Civic Solidarity Party	33,722	1.42	3
Justice, Law, Democracy Party	32,220	1.35	2
Republican Alternative Party (Azerbaijan)	17,993	0.76	1
Musavat	15,278	0.64	0
Great Azerbaijan Party	14,636	0.61	1
Motherland Party (Azerbaijan)	14,466	0.61	1
Azerbaijan National Independence Party	13,961	0.59	1
White Party (Azerbaijan)	13,564	0.57	0
Azerbaijan Hope Party	12,858	0.54	0
National Front Party (Azerbaijan)	11,554	0.49	1
Democratic Reforms Party	10,698	0.45	1
Azerbaijan Democratic Enlightenment Party	10,432	0.44	1
Great Order Party	8,651	0.36	1
Classic People's Front Party	7,466	0.31	0
Azerbaijan People's Party	5,351	0.22	0
Free Homeland Party (Azerbaijan)	4,886	0.21	0
Unity Party (Azerbaijan)	3,159	0.13	0
Right Justice Party	2,833	0.12	0
Modern Musavat Party	2,599	0.11	0
Justice Party (Azerbaijan)	2,323	0.10	0
New Time Party	2,031	0.09	0
Azerbaijan Democrat Party	2,013	0.08	0
Future Azerbaijan Party	694	0.03	0
National Revival Movement Party	178	0.01	0
Independents	936,915	39.35	44
Total	2,380,795	100.00	125

== Past elections ==
=== Presidential elections ===
- 2024 Azerbaijani presidential election
- 2018 Azerbaijani presidential election
- 2013 Azerbaijani presidential election
- 2008 Azerbaijani presidential election
- 2003 Azerbaijani presidential election
- 1998 Azerbaijani presidential election
- 1993 Azerbaijani presidential election
- 1992 Azerbaijani presidential election
- 1991 Azerbaijani presidential election
- 1990 Azerbaijani presidential election

=== Parliamentary elections ===
- 2024 Azerbaijani parliamentary election
- 2020 Azerbaijani parliamentary election
- 2015 Azerbaijani parliamentary election
- 2010 Azerbaijani parliamentary election
- 2005 Azerbaijani parliamentary election
- 2000–01 Azerbaijani parliamentary election
- 1995–1996 Azerbaijani parliamentary election
- 1990 Azerbaijani Supreme Soviet election

=== Constitutional referendums ===
- 2016 Azerbaijani constitutional referendum
- 2009 Azerbaijani constitutional referendum
- 2002 Azerbaijani constitutional referendum
- 1995 Azerbaijani constitutional referendum

=== Other referendums ===
- 1993 Azerbaijani vote of confidence referendum
- 1991 Azerbaijani independence referendum

== See also ==
- Electoral calendar
- Electoral system
