= Elchibeyism =

Political ideals and agenda

Elchibeyism (Azerbaijani: Elçibəyçilik, elçibəysevərlik) or Elchibey's path (Elçibəy yolu), refers to the political ideals of one of the leaders of the Azerbaijani Popular Front, and the second President of Azerbaijan, Abulfaz Elchibey (who was in power in 1992–1993). It is characterized by democracy, republicanism, social justice, Azerbaijanism, Pan-Turkism, advocation of Whole Azerbaijan, loyalty to the principles of the Azerbaijan Democratic Republic and pro-Turkey ideas. After the resignation and death of Elchibey, various parties, organizations and politicians remained attached to Elchibeyism. According to Panah Huseyn, who was the prime minister during Elchibey's reign, Elchibeyism, which has been in opposition since 1993, is the ideological rival of the New Azerbaijan Party government and Aliyevism.

Some compare the ideals of Elchibey with those of Mahammad Amin Rasulzade, one of the founders of the Azerbaijan Democratic Republic, and call this ideology the Rasulzadeh-Elchibey path (Rəsulzadə-Elçibəy yolu).

== History ==
With the adoption of certain resolutions at the founding conference of the Azerbaijani Popular Front (APF) held on 16 July 1989, the APF turned into an Elchibeyist movement. In early 1988, as a result of the influence of the processes taking place in the Soviet Union, the Azerbaijan Popular Front, which was formed as a form of organizing mass independent social and political initiatives, adopted the ideas of Abulfaz Elchibey and turned into a national democratic platform.

After the resignation and death of Elchibey, various parties, organizations and politicians remained attached to the ideology of Elchibeyism. According to Panah Huseyn, who was the prime minister during Elchibey's reign, Elchibeyism, which has been in opposition since 1993, is an ideological opponent of the New Azerbaijan Party government. According to politician Isa Gambar, the Aliyevist government is "trying to discredit" the Elchibeyism and "erase it from the people's memory".

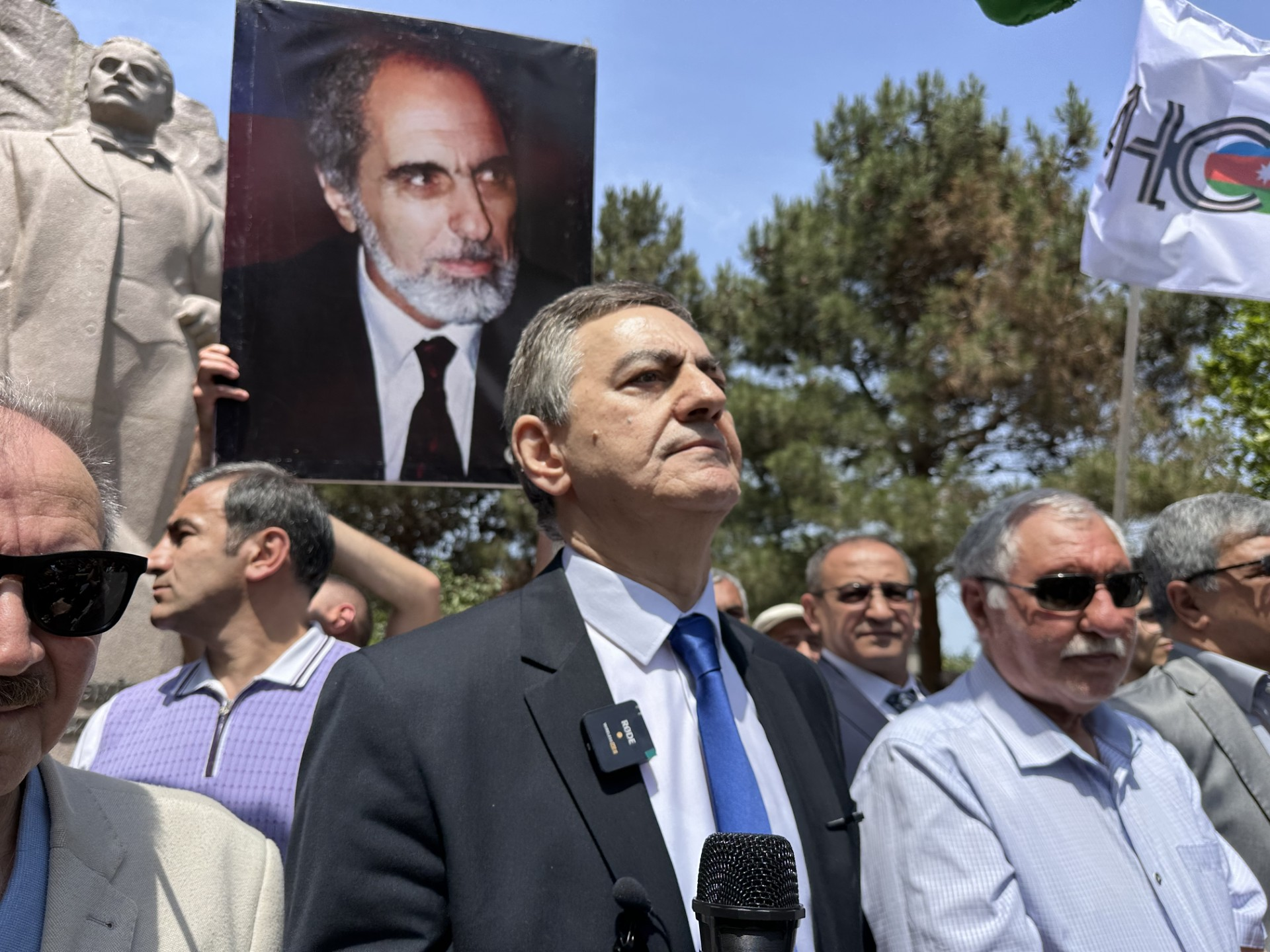
Ali Karimli during protests in May 2024. A portrait of Abulfaz Elchibey is seen behind him

Currently, there are political spheres in the Musavat Party, Azerbaijani Popular Front Party, Classical Popular Front Party (CPFP), and Whole Azerbaijan Popular Front Party that consider themselves Elchibeyists. Hurru Aliyev, Elchibey's nephew, participated in the 2020 parliamentary elections as an Elchibeyist candidate. Nevertheless, according to Eynulla Fatullayev, the constitutional referendum held in 2016 had "become a point of no return" for the Elchibeyists.

Ali Karimli, the chairman of the APFP, considers himself an Elchibeyist. However, political figures such as CPFP Chairman Mirmahmud Miralioglu, Azerbaijan Democrat Party Chairman Sardar Jalaloglu, Unity Party Chairman Tahir Karimli, Azerbaijan Nationalist Democratic "Grey Wolf" Party (AMDP) member of the organizing committee for congress preparation Safar Humbatov, and APFP member Namig Sadigli refuted his statements. Furthermore, in June 2017, some members of the APFP resigned from the party citing the suppression of Elchibeyism within the party. According to the politician Ogtay Gulaliyev, there were those who turned away from ideals of the movement to get positions within the state, mandate, money, status, luxurious living by calling themselves Elchibeyist.

== Criticism ==
President of Azerbaijan, Ilham Aliyev, repeatedly criticized the Elchibey government in his speeches. Writer Ali Akbar criticized Abulfaz Elchibey's cult of personality. According to him, the Azerbaijani opposition, which is fighting for power, was not able to "remove Elchibey from its agenda".
