= Ali Karimli =

Azerbaijani politician (born 1965)

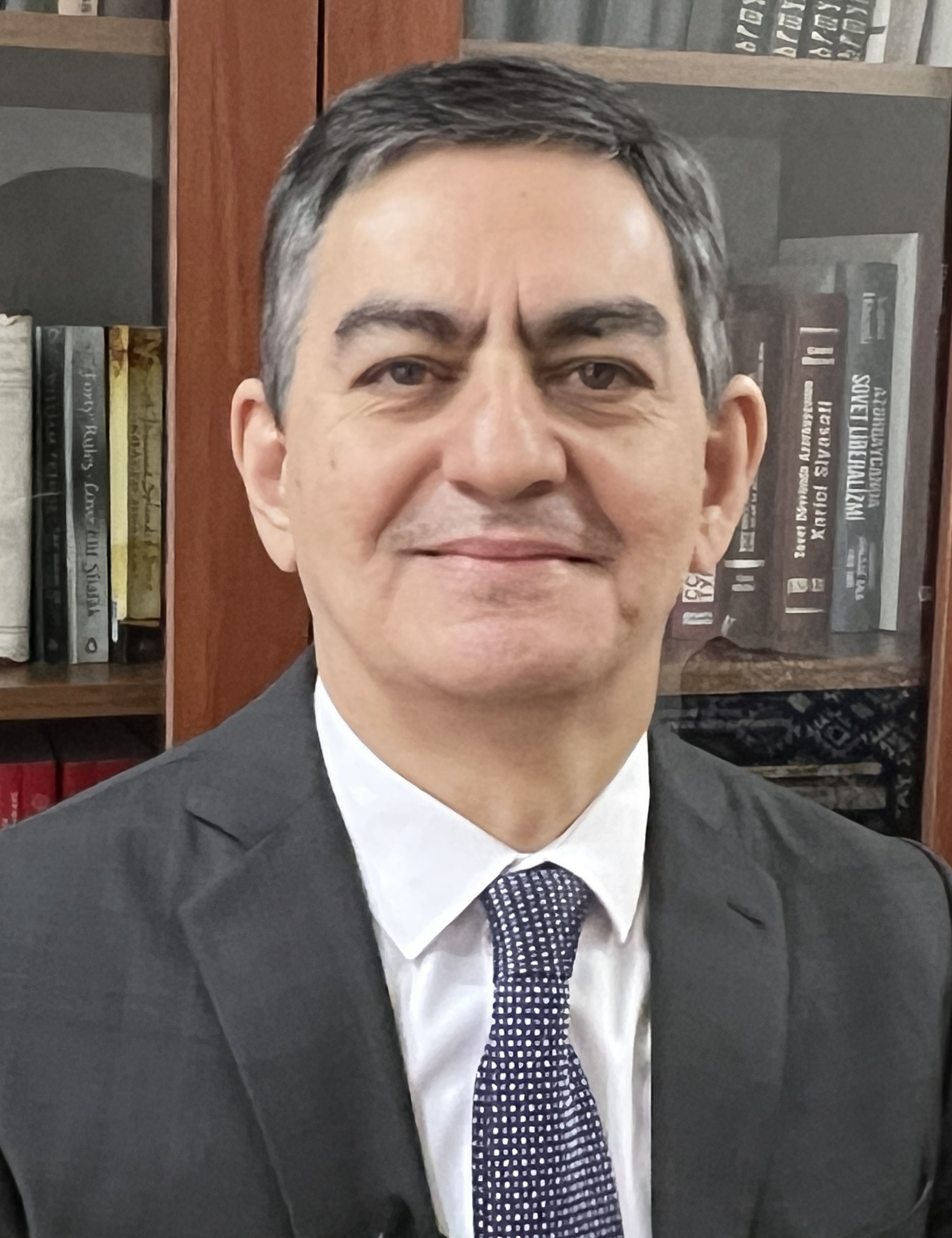
- Karimli in 2022

Leader of the Azerbaijan Popular Front Party
- Incumbent
- Assumed office 22 August 2000
- Preceded by: Abulfaz Elchibey

Secretary of State
- In office 1 May 1993 – 7 July 1993
- Preceded by: Panah Huseyn
- Succeeded by: Lala Shevket

Personal details
- Born: 28 April 1965 (age 61) Azadkend, Saatly District Azerbaijan SSR
- Party: Azerbaijan Popular Front Party

Ali Karimli (Azerbaijani: Əli Kərimli) born Ali Amirhuseyn oglu Karimov (Azerbaijani: Əli Əmirhüseyn oğlu Kərimov) (born 28 April 1965) is an Azerbaijani pro-democracy opposition leader, political prisoner, and the head of the reformist wing of the Azerbaijan Popular Front Party (APFP).

== Biography ==
Karimli was born in the Saatly District of southeastern Azerbaijan. After military service in the Soviet army in 1985, he studied law at the Baku State University. During his studies he established and headed the Yurd (Homeland) movement, which supported democratic reforms. In November 1988, Yurd, supported by intellectuals, organized student meetings in Baku to protest the communist regime. Special units of the security services were used to suppress the demonstrations. Like other Azerbaijani nationalists, Karimov changed his name, erasing the Russian ending -ov and became Əli Kərimli.

== Political career ==
=== In government ===
In July 1989 Karimli led Yurd into the newly created Popular Front of Azerbaijan (PFA) movement. He headed a party cell at his university and participated in the creation of the movement's charter.

In 1991, after receiving his diploma, he started working as a teacher in the Baku State University Law Department. At the same time, Karimli worked as a correspondent with the independent Azadlıq (Freedom) newspaper.

In January 1992, he was elected the deputy chairman of the PFA Supreme Council. In April 1993, the head of the PFA and the President of Azerbaijan Abulfaz Elchibey (Azerbaijan's first elected President after the breakup of the Soviet Union) appointed Karimli as Secretary of State.

After the coup d'etat in the summer of 1993 which brought Heydar Aliyev to power, Karimli submitted his resignation.

=== In opposition ===
In 1995, the PFA was renamed as the Azerbaijan Popular Front Party (APFP), with Elchibey remaining as its chairman. From 1995 till 2000 Karimli was Elchibey's first assistant. In the parliamentary elections of 1995 and 2000, he was also elected as a member of parliament. In 2000, after Elchibey's death, the APFP broke up into "conservative" and "reformist" wings. Karimli became the head of the "reformist" group, which was mostly made up of former activists of the Yurd.

Since 2003, Karimli has been calling for the creation of a bloc of opposition parties. In spring 2005, on Karimli's initiative, the Freedom (Azadıq) bloc of three parties was created, comprising the APFP-reformists, the Equality Party (Müsavat) and the Democratic Party.

Karimli is active in organizing protests that have rattled Baku since March 2011, part of a regional wave of unrest. He was interrogated for eight hours by the office of Attorney General Zakir Qaralov on 16 April in connection with the protests.

In April 2016, after Karimli criticized the Azerbaijani government over its actions during the 2016 Armenian–Azerbaijani clashes, he became a subject of a series of protests (the latest one held on 12 April in front of Karimli's house), allegedly organized by the authorities. The protesters also demanded to exile him from the country. According to the human rights lawyer Intigam Aliyev, attacks against Karimli are simply diverting attention from truly important issues and testing technologies to distract people's justified anger caused by the serious consequences of wrong decisions.

On 29 November 2025, Ali Karimli disappeared after security forces raided his apartment and detained him on unspecified charges. It was subsequently determined that he was being held in a State Security Forces detention facility and that had had been charged with "actions aimed at the violent seizure of power and forcible change of the constitutional order". On 10 June 2026, his pre-trial detention was extended by five months. The pre-trial investigation was completed on 2 October 2026. If found guilty, Karimli could receive a prison sentence of 12–20 years or life imprisonment. He has rejected the charges as "fabricated and politically motivated." On 12 November 2026 in London he was awarded the Magnitsky Human Rights Award as Outstanding Opposition Politician by Baroness Helena Kennedy.

== Personal life ==
Ali Karimli married Samara Seyidova in 1991; His first child from this marriage is Türkel Karimli, his second child is Sezen Karimli. while his third child is Timur Karimli. The youngest son, Timur Karimli, was born in March 2013.
