= Azadliq =

Azadliq (Azadlıq) in Azerbaijani language means Freedom.

- Azadliq (newspaper)
- Azadliq (radio station)
- Azadliq.az (online newspaper)
- Azadliq Square, Baku
- Freedom (Azerbaijan)
