= Abulfaz Elchibey =

President of Azerbaijan from 1992 to 1993

- Əbülfəz Elçibəy

2nd President of Azerbaijan
- In office 17 June 1992 – 24 June 1993
- Prime Minister: Rahim Huseynov; Ali Masimov (acting); Panah Huseynov
- Preceded by: Ayaz Mutallibov; Isa Gambar (acting)
- Succeeded by: Heydar Aliyev

Personal details
- Born: Abulfaz Gadirgulu oghlu Aliyev; 24 June 1938 Kalaki, Nakhichivan ASSR, Azerbaijan SSR, Soviet Union
- Died: 22 August 2000 (aged 62) Ankara, Turkiye
- Party: Azerbaijan Popular Front
- Spouse: Halima Aliyeva
- Children: 2
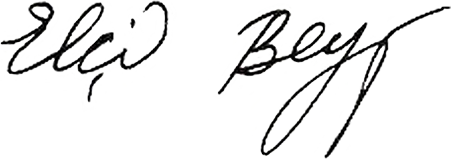
- Signature

Abulfaz Gadirgulu oghlu Aliyev (Note: Azerbaijani: Əbülfəz Qədirqulu oğlu Əliyev) (Azerbaijani: Əbülfəz Qədirqulu oğlu Əliyev, 24 June 1938 – 22 August 2000), commonly known as Abulfaz Elchibey, (Note: Azerbaijani: Əbülfəz Elçibəy) was a Azerbaijani nationalist and Soviet dissident who was the first, and as of today, only democratically elected president of post-Soviet Azerbaijan. He served from 17 June 1992 until his ouster in a 24 June 1993 military coup backed by Russia that led to the installation of Heydar Aliyev as president.

Abulfaz Aliyev was the leader of the Azerbaijani Popular Front, assuming the nickname Abulfaz Elchibey. Elchibey played an important role in achieving Azerbaijan's independence from the Soviet Union. He was elected as the president of Azerbaijan in independent Azerbaijan's first free election in 1992. Once in office, Elchibey sought to dismantle the old communist system domestically, such as having a planned economy and the black market. During his tenure, Elchibey had to contend with an administration staffed by former Communists and military forces that were not under his control. Elchibey's attempted reforms were halted by the 1993 coup.

Elchibey's term took place during the First Nagorno-Karabakh War against neighboring Armenia. In his foreign policy, Elchibey positioned himself as a pan-Turkist who sought to re-orient Azerbaijan towards the West and Turkiye while holding hostile views towards Armenia, Russia, and Iran. Elchibey endorsed the unification of Azerbaijan with the region that is known as Iranian Azerbaijan. According to historian Audrey Altstadt, Elchibey faced several major problems during his tenure as president: "the war in Nagorno-Karabagh (with the loss of area and creation of refugees), inflation and related economic problems (including slow progress on an oil deal with foreign investors), and the remnants of Russian-Soviet control and influence of the old order. The most immediately pressing problem was unrest around Baku." Elchibey was overthrown before the end of the war, and his tenure remains the only post-Soviet period in which Azerbaijan has been democratic.

== Biography ==
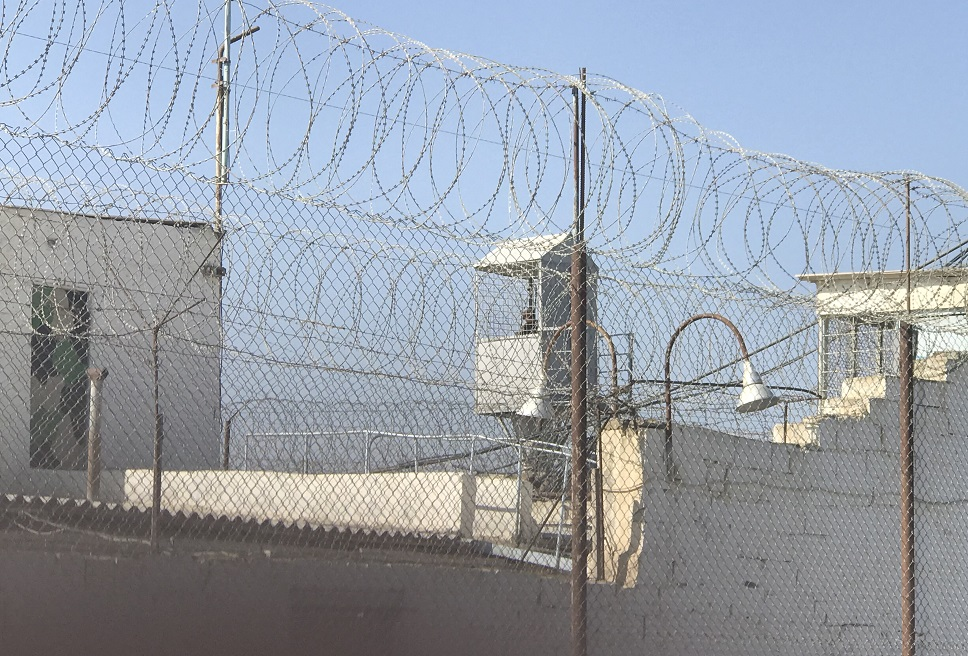
Correctional colony No. 14 in Qaradağ raion, where he served his sentence.

Abulfaz Aliyev studied Arabic at the Baku State University and graduated in 1957 from the Department of Arab Philology of the Faculty of Oriental Studies. He worked as a translator and later as a lecturer of history at the Baku State University. From 1963 to 1964 he lived in Egypt, working as a translator. He soon joined the Soviet dissident movement, supporting the re-establishment of Azerbaijani independence. He was arrested in 1975 on charges of defaming the Soviet Union and spent 18 months in prison. Thereafter he worked at the Institute of Manuscripts of Azerbaijan and published over 50 scientific works on oriental philosophy, history, literature and religion.

He assumed the nickname of Elchibey (Azerbaijani for "noble messenger") upon his leadership of the Azerbaijani Popular Front in 1990.

== Presidency ==
=== Assumption of power ===
Elchibey's rise to presidency came after the first round of heavy losses of Azerbaijan in the war against Armenia in the First Nagorno-Karabakh War. After the Khojaly Massacre (26–27 February 1992), the fall of Shusha (8 May 1992) and Lachin (15–17 May 1992), the temporary Azerbaijani communist establishment led by Yaqub Mammadov could no longer hold power. Amidst disorder on the frontline, former Azerbaijani president Ayaz Mutalibov attempted a comeback two months after his resignation in a parliamentary coup on 14 May 1992, resulting in public outrage and the military overthrow of Mutalibov by the Azerbaijani Popular Front in Baku on 15 May 1992.

The national presidential election with 7 candidates was held on 7 June 1992 in which Elchibey was elected the President of Azerbaijan, gaining 54% of votes and becoming Azerbaijan's first democratically elected, non-communist president.

=== Domestic policies ===
==== Military and security policy ====
During the summer of 1992, Elchibey secured the full withdrawal of the Soviet 4th Army and other elements of the Transcaucasus Military District from Azerbaijan, which became the first former Soviet republic (after the Baltic states) free of Soviet military presence. At the same time, Elchibey's government established the national Azerbaijani Navy and managed to reach an agreement with Russia on receiving one-quarter of the Soviet Caspian Flotilla based in Baku. Upon his election, Elchibey appointed Isgandar Hamidov, a police colonel and the leader of the newly established Grey Wolves movement in Azerbaijan, as the Minister of Interior. Hamidov, despite his personal devotion and contributions in capturing Agdere district of Azerbaijan, proved to be generally incompetent and resigned in April 1993 after the fall of Kalbajar.

==== Karabakh ====
In June 1992, the Azerbaijani army started a counter-offensive codenamed Operation Goranboy in Nagorno-Karabakh, establishing control of over 40% of the region by the fall of 1992 and approaching within 7 kilometers of Shusha. However, as the Azerbaijani offensive pushed further into Karabakh, it became further bogged down in controversy, mismanagement, corruption and treachery by Elchibey-appointed Defense Minister Rahim Gaziyev, along with the guerilla tactics of the NKR Army in mountain warfare. This led to unexpectedly heavy Azeri casualties, loss of heavy military equipment, and the campaign ending in failure.

=== Foreign policy ===
On 18 August 1992, Elchibey signed a decree on Azerbaijan's entry into the International Monetary Fund and the International Bank for Reconstruction and Development. On 7 and 8 September 1992, former British Prime Minister Margaret Thatcher visited Baku on an unofficial visit as a guest of Elchibey. During her visit, she oversaw the signing ceremony of an agreement between Azerbaijan, BP and Statoil on exploratory work at the Chirag oilfield. In this respect, one of Elchibey's goals in inviting Thatcher was to attract foreign entrepreneurs looking to do business in Azerbaijan. During a reception at the Gulustan Palace, he described Thatcher as being one who played a role in Azerbaijan achieving independence, saying that "she can see the fruits of the tree she planted".

==== Turkiye ====
In 1992, during a visit to the Turkish capital of Ankara, Elchibey described himself as a soldier of Mustafa Kemal Ataturk (founder and the first president of Turkish Republic). He also held some pan-Turanian views, for which he enjoyed the support of the leader of the Turkish Nationalist Movement Party, Colonel Alparslan Türkeş. In April 1993, he attended the funeral of President Turgut Özal in Istanbul, a person who shared his beliefs for a potential Turkic union from the former Soviet Union.

==== Russia ====
During his one-year rule, Azerbaijani–Russian relations were damaged, with his politics being described in this regard as "anti-Russian." He was noted for using an interpreter when speaking to Russian figures, despite being fluent in the Russian language as he was educated in the USSR. Often teasing the Russian leadership, he once declared that among the Russians who did the greatest services to democracy was Tatarstan President Mintimer Shaimiev and in a congratulatory telegram sent in connection with the adoption of a new Tatar constitution, Elchibey wrote that "the heroic Tatar people" have contributed to the "awakening and revival of the Turkic world". On 12 September 1992, he paid a visit to Moscow, during which he signed, along with Boris Yeltsin, the Treaty on Friendship, Cooperation and Mutual Security between the Republic of Azerbaijan and the Russian Federation. During Elchibey's reign, Hikmet Hajizade was appointed as Azerbaijan's first ambassador to Russia.

==== Iran ====
Elchibey was described as being "vehemently anti-Iranian" in his policies, this being due in part to their perception of an Iranian–Armenian alliance. Elchibey endorsed the unification of Azerbaijan with the region that is known as Iranian Azerbaijan, a stance which alienated Iran. During a visit to Turkiye, he called for the downfall of the Islamic Republic, which prompted a member of the Iranian parliament to threaten retaliation against the Republic of Azerbaijan.

==== Other states ====
Elchibey paid a visit to Ukraine on 12 November 1992, during which he said that, from the former republics of the Soviet Union, relations with Ukraine would be prioritized by Azerbaijan.

=== Downfall ===
On 9 June 1993, as rebellious troops were advancing onto Baku, President Elchibey invited Heydar Aliyev, former Soviet Politburo member and then head of Nakhchivan (and no relation to Elchibey, whose real surname was Aliyev), to Baku for negotiations with Surat Huseynov. Aliyev quickly took control of the power, becoming the Chairman of the Azerbaijani parliament on 15 June 1993 and offering the prime ministership of the country to Huseynov. Nine days later, in the vacuum of power left by Elchibey's departure to Nakhchivan, Aliyev constitutionally assumed presidential powers in his capacity as parliament speaker. He signed the Bishkek Protocol to cease hostilities on the frontline, and further solidified his power by organizing impeachment hearings and holding a national referendum on 29 August 1993, which formally stripped Elchibey of the presidency.

In another national election, on 3 October 1993, Heydar Aliyev was elected as president of Azerbaijan with 99% of the votes.

== Post-presidency and death ==
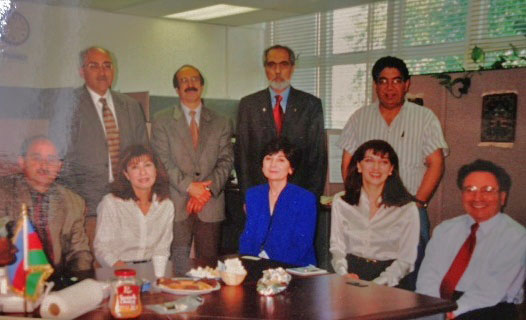
Elchibey (center right, background) on Voice of America in 2000.

During Aliyev's presidency, Elchibey returned to Baku in 1997 and joined the opposition as the leader of Azerbaijani Popular Front Party.

In 2000, Elchibey was diagnosed with prostate cancer and died in August of the same year at a military hospital in Ankara, Turkiye. His body was flown to Baku and given a state funeral at the Alley of Honor with then-President Heydar Aliyev in attendance.

The Elchibey Institute in Azerbaijan was created on 17 November 2020 in Baku with the aim to promote the national ideology and policies of Elchibey.

== See also ==
- President of Azerbaijan
- Politics of Azerbaijan
- National Assembly of Azerbaijan
- Foreign relations of Azerbaijan
- List of political parties in Azerbaijan
- Whole Azerbaijan
- Azerbaijan National Resistance Organization
- Elchibeyism

== Notes ==
Political offices
| Preceded by Isa Gambar | President of Azerbaijan; 16 June 1992 – 1 September 1993 | Succeeded by Heydar Aliyev |
