= Azerbaijani Popular Front Party =

Azerbaijani Popular Front Party Azərbaycan Xalq Cəbhəsi Partiyası
- Leader: Ali Karimli
- Founders: Abulfaz Elchibey
- Founded: 1989
- Headquarters: Baku, Azerbaijan
- Ideology: Democracy; Conservatism; Anti-communism; Anti-corruption; Azerbaijani nationalism; Pro-Europeanism
- Political position: Centre-right
- National affiliation: National Council of Democratic Forces
- European affiliation: European Conservatives and Reformists Party

The Azerbaijani Popular Front Party (APFP; Azerbaijani: Azərbaycan Xalq Cəbhəsi Partiyası, pronounced [ɑːzæɾbɑjˈdʒɑn xɑlɡ ˈdʒæpæsi]) is a political party in Azerbaijan, founded in 1989 by Abulfaz Elchibey. Since Elchibey was ousted from power in the 1993 military coup, the party has been one of the main opposition parties to the authoritarian regimes of presidents Heydar Aliyev and his son Ilham Aliyev.

Formed in 1989 as an anti-Soviet political movement, the party pushed for Azerbaijan's independence from the Soviet Union and staged mass protests against the Soviet regime. After Azerbaijan attained independence from the Soviet Union, Popular Front pressured the communist old guard that controlled the newly independent Azerbaijan to establish a parliament and allow free elections. The party pressured Ayaz Mutallibov, Azerbaijan's first president to implement democratic reforms and forced him out of power in 1992 when he tried to cancel the 1992 presidential election in a self-coup. Popular Front leader Abulfaz Elchibey was elected in the 1992 election.

The party's policies emphasized democracy, rule of law, and secularism, as well as respect for human rights, religious rights and ethnic minorities.

In the aftermath of the 1993 coup where Elchibey was ousted from power, the party has been blocked from participating in several elections, and prominent individuals associated with the party have been repressed by Azerbaijan governments ruled by Heydar Aliyev and his son Ilham Aliyev. The party has also boycotted several elections, citing an unbalanced playing field and repression by the incumbent government.

== History ==
=== Popular Front of Azerbaijan ===
The founding congress of the party was held in July 1989.

PFA came to unite several informal public organizations which were established in the 1980s to struggle for the independence of Azerbaijan from the Soviet Union. In 1987, Ali Karimli, a law school student, became the founder and leader of one of these informal organizations - "Yurd" ("Homeland") - that inspired and led thousands of students to the main square of Baku city to protest against the Soviet Union. As a result, a large-scale campaign of public demonstrations and meetings swept across Azerbaijan. Later, the movement was suppressed by the special forces of the Ministry of Defense and Ministry of Internal Affairs of the USSR. Despite this fact, the Popular Front of Azerbaijan was established and Yurd became an integral part of this movement. In 1989, the PFA initiated a rail blockade against Armenia in 1989 which eventually consolidated into a full blockade with the support of both the governments of Azerbaijan and Turkey: a blockade which persists today.

Intellectuals associated with the party questioned the official Soviet narrative of the Soviet takeover of Azerbaijan in 1920.

In 1992, Abulfaz Elchibey, the leader of PFA, won the 1992 Azerbaijani presidential election. A period of political, social, and economic reforms followed. The laws on political parties, freedom of press, education, and others were adopted. The country chose a pro-western, liberal economic course and established the national currency, the Azerbaijani manat.

In April 1993, the Russian (formerly Soviet) army was withdrawn from Azerbaijan. Azerbaijan became the first republic in the former USSR, which achieved a full and unconditional withdrawal of Russian troops.

General Heydar Aliyev captured power in 1993 following the 1993 Azerbaijani coup d'état and the Subsequent vote of confidence referendum on Abulfaz Elchibey's presidency. Elchibey was forced to leave the capital city.

=== Transformation to political party ===
After Elchibey's death in 2000, the party split into two wings, the reform wing led by Ali Kerimli and the classical wing led by Mirmahmud Miralioglu.

Considering the dramatic and challenging situation facing PFA following the coup, Ali Karimli took the initiative by leading and protecting the organization from the attacks of the new regime from 1993 until 1997 and restoring its political power. In 1995, with the proposal of Ali Karimli and as a result of internal party discussions, the Popular Front of Azerbaijan was reorganized from a social-political movement into a political party. In the same year, the Popular Front Party of Azerbaijan (PFPA) managed to take seats in Parliament, and Ali Kerimli became a leader of the parliamentary party fraction.

In 2000, after the death of PFPA Chairman Elchibey, Ali Karimli was elected Chairman of the Party. In the 2000 parliament elections, PFPA retook seats, and Ali Karimli was elected the leader of the opposition faction in parliament.

The 2003 Azerbaijani presidential election in Azerbaijan fell short of international norms and standards. They were followed by another wave of repressions against the opposition. Consequently, PFPA first suggested and then proclaimed the unification of opposition as the surest means to free and fair elections. On 18 March 2005 Popular Front Party of Azerbaijan (PFPA) signed an agreement with other opposition parties to establish a united opposition bloc – "Freedom" - for participation in the parliamentary elections in November 2005.

== Election results ==
=== Presidential elections ===
Election	Party candidate	Votes	%	Result
1993	Abulfaz Elchibey	3,919,923	98.83%	Elected ✓
2003	Gudrat Gasanguliev	12,071	0.50%	Lost ✗

=== Supreme Soviet elections ===
Election	Leader	Seats	+/–	Position	Government
1990	Abulfaz Elchibey	45 / 360	New	▲2nd	Opposition

=== National Assembly elections ===
Election	Leader	Votes	%	Seats	+/–	Position	Government
1995–1996	Abulfaz Elchibey	346,092	9.7	4 / 125	New	▲2nd	Opposition
2000–2001	Ali Karimli		11.0	6 / 125	▲2	▲2nd	Opposition
2005	Ali Karimli			1 / 125	▼5	▼12th	Opposition
2010	Ali Karimli			0 / 125	▼1	▲6th	Extra-parliamentary
