= 1990 Azerbaijani Supreme Soviet election =

- 30 September 1990
- All 360 seats in the Supreme Soviet; 180 seats needed for a majority
Party	Leader	Seats
Communist Party	Ayaz Mutallibov	280
APFP	Abulfaz Elchibey	45
Independents	–	15
This lists parties that won seats. See the complete results below.
Chairman of the Supreme Soviet before	Chairman of the Supreme Soviet after
Elmira Gafarova; CPSU	Elmira Gafarova; CPSU

Supreme Soviet elections were held in the Azerbaijan SSR on 30 September and 14 October 1990. They were the first multi-party elections in the country.

According to historian Audrey Altstadt,

The 1990 elections were characterized by intimidation, including the jailing of several Popular Front candidates, the murder of two others, and unabashed stuffing of ballot boxes in at least some districts in Baku, as witnessed by observers from the US Embassy-Moscow and the US Commission for Security and Cooperation in Europe (CSCE)

== Results ==
Party	Seats
Azerbaijan Communist Party	280
Azerbaijan Popular Front	45
Independents	15
Vacant	20
Total	360
