= Audrey Altstadt =

American historian (born 1953)

- Born: 1953 (age 72–73)
- Education: University of Chicago; University of Illinois Urbana-Champaign
- Occupation: Historian

Audrey L. Altstadt (born 1953) is an American historian, specializing in history of Azerbaijan and Sovietology. She holds the rank of a Professor of History at the University of Massachusetts Amherst and authored three books and multiple articles on the politics, culture and history of Azerbaijan.

== Academic work ==
Altstadt started as a first year graduate student of international relations at the University of Chicago, supervised by professor Alexandre Bennigsen. In 1975, she received an undergraduate degree in Russian Language and Area Studies from the University of Illinois Urbana-Champaign. Under Bennigsen she studied the non-Russian nations, including Azerbaijan. On the advice of Bennigsen to work "from the inside", she started studying Azerbaijani language in 1977. In 1980 Altstadt visited Azerbaijan's capital Baku on a year-long academic exchange for doctoral research. There, she received access to Baku State University and the State Historical Archives.

In her first book, The Azerbaijani Turks: Power and Identity Under Russian Rule, Altstadt used both Russian-language and Azerbaijani-language newspapers, journals and scholarly publications, much of which has never been used in other Western studies. Altstadt's works were published in the United States, United Kingdom, France, Turkey and Azerbaijan. Altstadt praised the Azerbaijan Democratic Republic and noted that, while Azerbaijan set off on a hopeful course in 1992–93, it then lost an uphill battle against democratic backsliding.

In addition to professorship, Altstadt holds an earned doctorate from the University of Chicago and an honorary doctorate from Khazar University of Baku, Azerbaijan. Altstadt also consulted with the US Foreign Service, Radio Liberty, US Institute of Peace, the CSCE and Freedom House. She has been in friendly relations with researchers Tadeusz Swietochowski, Svante Cornell and Thomas Goltz.

=== Selected publications ===
- The Azerbaijani Turks: Power and Identity under Russian Rule. Hoover Institution Press, 1992
- The Politics of Culture in Soviet Azerbaijan, 1920-40, Routledge, 2016, ISBN 1317245431
- Frustrated Democracy in Post-Soviet Azerbaijan, Woodrow Wilson Center Press/Columbia University Press, 2017

== Criticism ==
In his review of Altstadt's The Politics of Culture in Soviet Azerbaijan, 1920–1940, historian Steven Usitalo of Northern State University considers the book a necessary one on Soviet Azerbaijan, but deems it a "flawed one" as well. According to Usitalo, the book contains "select, glaring, pro-Azeri biases".

In her review of Altstadt's Frustrated Democracy in Post-Soviet Azerbaijan, historian Kelsey Rice of Berry College asserts that "in her [Altstadt's] view of Azerbaijani history, Persian, Russian, and Soviet rule were unequivocally oppressive and despotic. With this premise, her history veers toward a nationalist narrative of Azerbaijan, assuming the immutable existence of a defined Azerbaijani nation across the centuries chafing for independence under successive foreign rulers."

== Views ==
In 2016, Altstadt, discussing the Azerbaijani economy and political leadership, referred to Ilham Aliyev as the "keystone in the arch" of Azerbaijani politics, and added "Its not so much that he is the great genius national leader like his father, but he keeps the balance".
