= Southern Azerbaijan National Awakening Movement =

Southern Azerbaijan National Awakening Movement گۆنئی آذربایجان میللی وْیانؽش حرکتی Güney Azərbaycan Milli Oyanış Hərəkatı
- Abbreviation: GAMOH
- Leader: Mahmudali Chehregani, Mohammad Reza Laghaei
- Founded: 2002; 24 years ago
- Headquarters: Baku
- Ideology: Azerbaijani nationalism; Whole Azerbaijan; Pan-Turkism; Separatism
- National affiliation: Congress of Nationalities for a Federal Iran

Party flag

Website
- http://www.gamoh.org/

The Southern Azerbaijan National Awakening Movement (SANAM) (Azerbaijani: گۆنئی آذربایجان میللی وْیانؽش حرکتی, romanized: Güney Azərbaycan Milli Oyanış Hərəkatı; GAMOH) is a Baku-based Azerbaijani nationalist group that advocates self-determination for Iranian Azerbaijanis, and the "unification of Azerbaijanis living on both sides of the Aras River".

== Foundation and mission ==
It was separated from (SANLM) and founded in 2002 by Mahmudali Chehregani, and claims to represent the interests of Iran's Azerbaijani minority.

At the UNPO, Iranian Azerbaijan was previously represented by Southern Azerbaijan National Awakening Movement.

While Ilham Aliyev has attempted to dismiss claims that his government is taking any anti-Iranian ethnic nationalist positions, the Iranian government and groups like Iranian nationalist circles, especially Iranian Azerbaijanis, are dubious about the intentions of the Azerbaijani government due to the ongoing actions of irredentist elements like the Southern Azerbaijan National Awakening Movement and the support that they receive from Azerbaijani authorities, both state and non-state.

== See also ==
- Azerbaijan National Resistance Organization
- Human rights in Iran
- Whole Azerbaijan

== Sources ==
- Ahmadi, Hamid (2016). "The Clash of Nationalisms: Iranian Response to Baku's Irredentism". In Kamrava, Mehran (ed.). The Great Game in West Asia: Iran, Turkey and the South Caucasus. Oxford University Press. pp. 102–140. ISBN 978-0190673604.
