= 1993 Azerbaijani coup d'état =

1993 coup d'état in Azerbaijan

- Part of First Nagorno-Karabakh War
- Map of the coup
Date	4–15 June 1993
Location	Ganja and Baku, Azerbaijan
Result	Coup successful: President Abulfaz Elchibey removed; Heydar Aliyev establishes an authoritarian dictatorship; Beginning of the Aliyev family's hereditary rule and cult of personality; End of democracy in Azerbaijan

Belligerents
Huseynov militia Supported by: Russia	Azerbaijani Government; APFP

Commanders and leaders
Heydar Aliyev; Surat Huseynov	Abulfaz Elchibey; Dadash Rzayev

The 1993 Azeri coup d'état, also known as the Ganja Uprising, was a military coup led by Azerbaijani military commander Surat Huseynov. On June 4, 1993, Huseynov's forces led a march from the city of Ganja to the Azerbaijani capital of Baku in order to overthrow President Abulfaz Elchibey who was elected in independent Azerbaijan's first free election in 1992.

The Russia-backed coup ousted Elchibey and installed Heydar Aliyev as president. Shortly afterwards, Russia would begin supporting coup attempts against Aliyev, such as the 1994 coup.

== Context ==
Azerbaijan declared independence from the USSR in 1991 amid the dissolution of the Soviet Union. Later that year, Azerbaijan became embroiled in the First Nagorno-Karabakh War against the breakaway Republic of Nagorno-Karabakh backed by Armenian forces.

In part due to unrest generated by the conflict, a coup d'état deposed the government of Ayaz Mutallibov, who was replaced in elections in 1992 by Abulfaz Elchibey.

== Prelude ==
In the months leading up to the rebellion, divisions grew between Elchibey and top members of the Azerbaijani military apparatus, including Minister of Defense Rahim Gaziev and Captain Surat Huseynov, leader of the 709th Brigade.

In February 1993, after military personnel reported accusations of insubordination implicating Huseynov and Gaziev, the Elchibey government took action to punish both leaders. Huseynov was ordered back to the capital Baku, but instead brought his troops to Ganja. Gaziev was removed from his post later that month.

In March, an offensive by Armenian forces in the Kalbajar region of Azerbaijan adjoining Nagorno-Karabakh led to the occupation of Kalbajar, successful in part due to Huseynov's departure. The disastrous defeat placed pressure on the Elchibey administration, which responded by declaring a national state of emergency.

== Rebellion ==
On June 4, 1993, a contingent of troops sent by Elchibey's government to deal with Huseynov in Ganja was repelled. Following this affront, Huseynov's militia, armed with materiel left by the Russian 104th Airborne Division, began a "march on Baku" to confront the government.

Immediately afterwards, dozens of Elchibey government officials resigned, and protests erupted demanding a change of government. Faced with strengthening opposition and looking for allies, Elchibey turned to Heydar Aliyev, former Azerbaijani KGB head and chairman of the Nakhchivan Supreme Assembly. Backed by Elchibey, Aliyev mounted a successful bid to become speaker of parliament on June 15.

On June 18, as Huseynov's militia neared the capital of Baku, Elchibey fled to his home in Nakhchivan. Order continued to deteriorate when an associate of Huseynov, Talysh nationalist Alikram Hummatov began another rebellion proclaiming an autonomous republic in the Lankaran region.

In the absence of the elected president, on June 24, Speaker Aliyev was granted special powers by the parliament. The following day, Huseynov was appointed Prime Minister, and the political situation began to stabilize.

A referendum held on August 29 formally removed Elchibey from power, enabling Aliyev to be elected constitutional president in the elections held days later.

== Aftermath ==
The tumult caused by the coup allowed Armenian forces to further capture the regions of Agdam, Fuzuli and Jabrail in the summer of 1993. Under the Aliyev government, Azerbaijani counteroffensives saw limited success in recapturing portions of the seized regions. As the conflict ground to a halt, Heydar Aliyev signed a ceasefire in May 1994, ending the war.

In October 1994, relations soured between Aliyev and Huseynov, with the president accusing Huseynov of plotting a coup against Aliyev in league with OPON. Huseynov fled to Russia, where he reunited with his former conspirator Rahim Gaziev. The two were later extradited and sentenced in Azerbaijan. Aliyev remained president, winning contested elections in 1998, until 2003 when power passed to his son Ilham Aliyev.

Deposed president Abulfaz Elchibey remained in Nakhchivan until his return to politics in 1997, later leaving the country for Turkey, where he died in 2000.

== See also ==
- Talysh-Mughan Autonomous Republic
- 1995 Azerbaijani coup attempt
