= Freedom Bloc (Azerbaijan) =

Political alliance in Azerbaijan

Freedom (Azadlıq) was an electoral alliance of the Musavat (Müsavat Partiyası), the Azerbaijan Popular Front Party (Azərbaycan Xalq Cəbhəsi Partiyası) and the Azerbaijan Democratic Party (Azərbaycan Demokrat Partiyası).

In the 2005 Azerbaijan parliamentary elections, held on 6 November 2005, it won only 7 out of 125 seats.
