= 2002 Azerbaijani constitutional referendum =

A constitutional referendum was held in Azerbaijan on 24 August 2002. The referendum was initiated by the authoritarian Heydar Aliyev regime. Voters were asked eight separate questions, all of which were approved with at least 96% voting in favour. The referendum was marred by fraud.

== Background ==
On 22 June 2002 President Heydar Aliyev proposed 39 amendments to 23 articles of the constitution. In accordance with articles 3 and 152, the amendments required a referendum to take place, with a turnout of at least 25% of voters from the integrated voter list.

The proposal was approved by the Constitutional Court on 21 June. On 24 July the Central Election Commission ruled that the 39 amendments would be covered by eight separate questions, despite demands from the opposition that each amendment be voted on separately. On 30 August the commission made a ruling that absolute voting figures would not be published, only the percentages.

On 29 July the National Assembly voted by 94 to 5 to adopt the amendments.

== Proposals ==
1. Changes due to liabilities of Azerbaijan Republic to European Council	I. In Article 95, 6th and 19th items to be worded as follows: "6) Election of authoritative representative on human rights of Azerbaijan Republic on the representation of the President of Azerbaijan Republic"; "19) amnesty".
1. Changes due to liabilities of Azerbaijan Republic to European Council	II. Item 14 of Article 109 to be worded as follows: "14) shall give representation on election of authoritative representative on human rights of Azerbaijan Republic to Milli Mejlis of Azerbaijan Republic".
1. Changes due to liabilities of Azerbaijan Republic to European Council	III. To substitute the words "Economic Court" in Articles 95, 109, 125 and 128 for "Appellate courts".
1. Changes due to liabilities of Azerbaijan Republic to European Council	IV. In Article 130: to remove the 7th item from part III, the 8th and 9th items to be considered items 7 and 9; parts V, VI and VII to be considered parts VIII, IX and Õ accordingly; to add parts V, VI and VII in the following wording: "V. Everyone, in the course of the law, may lodge a complaint to the Constitutional Court of Azerbaijan Republic regarding the standard acts of legislation and executive power authorities, municipal and judicial acts for decision of issues indicated in items 1-7 of part III of this article by the Constitutional Court of Azerbaijan Republic with the purpose of restoration of violated human rights and liberty". "VI. The courts in the course of the law of Azerbaijan Republic, may apply to the Constitutional Court of Azerbaijan Republic for interpretation of the Constitution and laws of Azerbaijan Republic in view of issues on exercise of human rights and liberty" "VII. The authoritative representative on human rights of Azerbaijan Republic may inquire the Constitutional Court about the standard acts of legislation and executive power authorities, municipal and judicial acts for decision of issues indicated in items 1-7 of part III of this article by the Constitutional Court of Azerbaijan Republic".
1. Changes due to liabilities of Azerbaijan Republic to European Council	V. Article 132 to be worded as follows: "Article 132. The appellate courts of Azerbaijan Republic; I. The appellate courts of Azerbaijan Republic shall be the highest legal body on considering disputes relating to their competence under the law. II. Judges of the appellate courts of Azerbaijan Republic shall be appointed by the Milli Mejlis of the Azerbaijan Republic on the representation of the President of Azerbaijan Republic.
2. Changes due to joining of Azerbaijan Republic to European Convention on protection of human rights and liberty	I. To remove the words "fulfilment of the order given by the authoritative official during the emergency situation and martial law" from Article 27 part IV.
2. Changes due to joining of Azerbaijan Republic to European Convention on protection of human rights and liberty	II. To remove the word "only" from Article 71.
2. Changes due to joining of Azerbaijan Republic to European Convention on protection of human rights and liberty	III. In Article 155: to add the words "or their annulment" after the word "changes"; the words "on restriction of items" to be replaced with the words "on deprivation of human rights and liberty or on restrictions of higher degree than those provided by international agreements supported by Azerbaijan Republic".
2. Changes due to joining of Azerbaijan Republic to European Convention on protection of human rights and liberty	IV. In Article 125 part IV the words "in the implementation of Judicial power with the exception of the Constitutional legal procedure" to be replaced with the words "in criminal legal procedure".
2. Changes due to joining of Azerbaijan Republic to European Convention on protection of human rights and liberty	V. In Article 76 part II the words "alternative military service" to be replaced with the words "alternative service".
3. Changes due to improvement of referendum conducting	I. To add part III to Article 3 in the following wording: "III. Referendum cannot be conducted on the following issues: 1) taxes and state budget; 2) amnesty and pardon; 3) election, appointment or approval of the officials, whose election, appointment or approval are under the jurisdiction of legislation bodies and (or) executive power accordingly".
4. Changes due to elections to Milli Mejlis of Azerbaijan Republic	I. In Article 83 the words "and proportionate election systems" to be replaced with the words "election systems".
4. Changes due to elections to Milli Mejlis of Azerbaijan Republic	II. To remove item 6 from Article 89 part I.
5. Changes due to election of the President of Azerbaijan Republic	I. In Article 101: in part II the words "by the majority of two thirds" to be replaced with the words "by the majority of more than half"; in part IV to remove the word "simple"
5. Changes due to election of the President of Azerbaijan Republic	II. In Article 102 number "7" to be replaced with number "14".
6. Changes due to improvement of public authorities activity	I. The Article 95 part III to be worded as follows: "III. Decrees are also adopted on other issues being under the jurisdiction of Milli Mejlis of Azerbaijan Republic according to the present Constitution of Azerbaijan Republic; on the issues connected with organizational management of Milli Mejlis of Azerbaijan Republic; on the issues, with respect to which Milli Mejlis should express its opinion".
6. Changes due to improvement of public authorities activity	II. In the first paragraph of Article 88 part I the words "two regular Sessions" to be replaced with the words "two regular autumnal and vernal Sessions"; the second, third and fourth paragraphs to be removed; in the sixth paragraph the words "until February 1" to be replaced with the words "until March 10".
6. Changes due to improvement of public authorities activity	III. In Article 105: in part I the words "the Chairman of Milli Mejlis of Azerbaijan Republic" to be replaced with the words "the Prime-minister of Azerbaijan Republic"; in part II the words " In case of resignation of the Chairman of Milli Mejlis of Azerbaijan Republic" to be replaced with the words "In case of resignation of the Prime-minister of Azerbaijan Republic", and the words "shall be fulfilled by the Prime-Minister of Azerbaijan Republic" to be replaced with the words "shall be fulfilled by the Chairman of Milli Mejlis of Azerbaijan Republic"; in part III the words "by the Prime-minister of Azerbaijan Republic" to be replaced with the words "by the Chairman of Milli Mejlis of Azerbaijan Republic".
6. Changes due to improvement of public authorities activity	IV. Article 158 to be worded as follows: "Article 158. Restriction of Initiative on Introducing Additions to the Constitution of Azerbaijan Republic In light of the provisions reflected in the first section of the present Constitution, no additions can be proposed to the Constitution of Azerbaijan".
7. Changes due to conducting of judicial reforms	I. In the first part of Article 96 after the words "Supreme Court" to add the words "Office of Public Prosecutor of Azerbaijan Republic", in parts II and IV after the words "Supreme Court" to add the words "Office of Public Prosecutor of Azerbaijan Republic", and in part V after the words "Supreme Court" to add the words "Office of Public Prosecutor of Azerbaijan Republic";
7. Changes due to conducting of judicial reforms	II. in the first part of Article 131 the words "it shall exercise control over the activity of general and specialized courts in the order specified by the Law" to be replaced with the words "it shall put justice into practice in appeal order".
7. Changes due to conducting of judicial reforms	III. in the first part of Article 133 after the words "in order" to add the words "and in cases of"; to remove the words "accurate and uniform".
8. Other changes	I. To add part VI to Article 134 with the following wording: "VI. The Constitution of Nakhichevan Autonomous Republic shall be represented by the President of Azerbaijan Republic and approved by the Constitutional Law".
8. Other changes	II. Part III of Article 142 to be worded as follows: "III. Principles of municipality status shall be determined by the present Constitution, and rules of elections to municipality shall be determined by the Law".
8. Other changes	III. In part III of Article 149 the words "executive power" to be replaced with the words "legislative, executive power"
Source: Direct Democracy

== Results ==
Question	For	Against	Invalid	Total votes	Registered voters	Turnout
Question 1	97.07	2.63	0.28	3,899,242	4,407,417	88.47
Question 2	97.01	2.69	0.30	3,899,242	4,407,417	88.47
Question 3	96.82	2.69	0.35	3,899,242	4,407,417	88.47
Question 4	96.77	2.69	0.41	3,899,242	4,407,417	88.47
Question 5	96.99	2.73	0.28	3,899,242	4,407,417	88.47
Question 6	96.79	2.92	0.29	3,899,242	4,407,417	88.47
Question 7	96.79	2.80	0.41	3,899,242	4,407,417	88.47
Question 8	96.53	2.80	0.41	3,899,242	4,407,417	88.47
Source: Direct Democracy
