= Whole Azerbaijan =

Irredentist concept

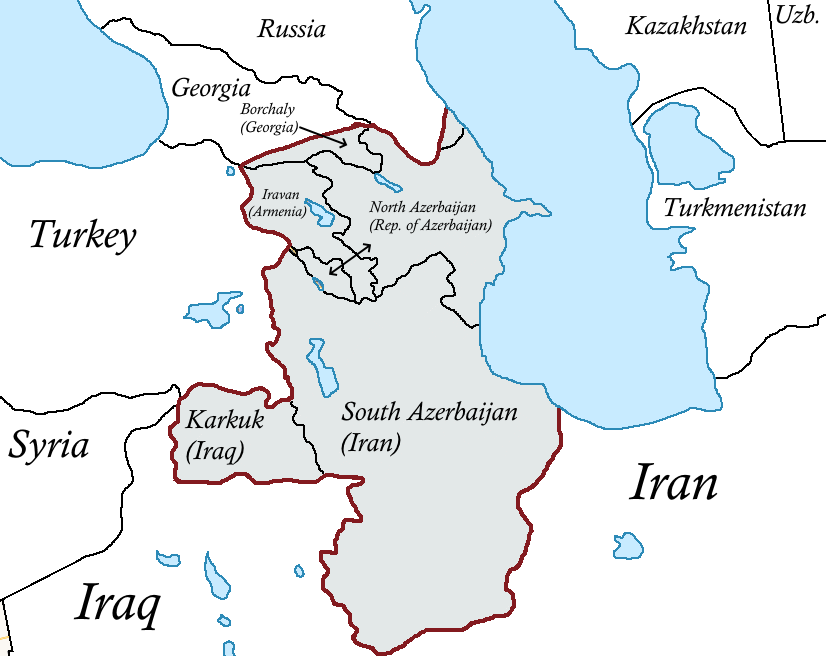
Map of "Whole Azerbaijan" according to Azerbaijani historian Adalet Tahirzade

Whole Azerbaijan (Azerbaijani: Bütöv Azərbaycan) is an irredentist concept of uniting presumed historically Azerbaijani-inhabited territories into the Republic of Azerbaijan.

== History ==
The idea of "Whole Azerbaijan" was formulated by Piruz Dilanchi in 1991 and defined in 1992 by Azerbaijani president Abulfaz Elchibey (s. 1992-93). In 1991, Dilanchi founded the SANLM nationalist organization and in 1997 Elchibey founded the "Whole Azerbaijan Union" (Bütöv Azərbaycan Birliyi) organization. Elchibey published his book on the idea, Bütöv Azərbaycan yolunda, lit. 'On the Path to a Whole Azerbaijan', in Turkey in 1998. It claimed that the borders of Azerbaijan should extend from Derbent to the Persian Gulf. Elchibey claimed that this was a territory of Azerbaijani historical ethnic presence. He proposed that Azerbaijan had right to rule it, under a proposed system of governance called "United Azerbaijani Lands" (Birləşmiş Azərbaycan Yurdları). It was published posthumously in 2002. He opposed the idea of a separate and independent South Azerbaijan. Elchibey's ultimate goal was to unite the newly independent Republic of Azerbaijan with the Azerbaijan region under Iranian rule (in his words, South Azerbaijan) and then unite with Turkey to establish a "Turk" federation.

Azerbaijani historiography portrays the early to mid 1800s as the "ideal" and "normative" situation with Azeri sovereignty over Karabakh and Southern Azerbaijan (Iran), despite that a "united Azerbaijan" was never, in fact, independent but always part of the Iranian empires. The concept of Whole Azerbaijan has been Azerbaijani state policy since the September 2022 Armenia–Azerbaijan clashes.

== Political initiatives ==
The term Whole Azerbaijan continued in political initiatives including the SANLM (CAMAH) and Whole Azerbaijan Popular Front Party.

== Boundaries ==
Although the boundaries of Whole Azerbaijan are not strictly defined, some proponents portray them as encompassing the following areas:

- Iranian Azerbaijan / South Azerbaijan (Cənubi Azərbaycan) - (Iran) provinces of East Azerbaijan, West Azerbaijan, Ardabil and Zanjan
- Western Azerbaijan (Qərbi Azərbaycan) - all of the territory of Armenia
- Derbent (Dərbənd) - (Russia) Derbentsky district, Republic of Dagestan
- Borchali (Borçalı) - (Georgia (country)) part of the Kvemo Kartli province of Georgia

== See also ==
- Armenia–Azerbaijan border
- Azerbaijan (toponym)
- Azerbaijan–Iran border
- Azerbaijani nationalism
  - Southern Azerbaijan National Awakening Movement
- Zangezur Corridor
- Western Azerbaijan (irredentist concept)
- Qara Qoyunlu

== Sources ==
- Astourian, Stephan H. (2023). "Origins, Main Themes and Underlying Psychological Disposition of Azerbaijani Nationalism". In Dorfmann-Lazarev, Igor; Khatchadourian, Haroutioun (eds.). Monuments and Identities in the Caucasus Karabagh, Nakhichevan and Azerbaijan in Contemporary Geopolitical Conflict. Brill. pp. 206–236. ISBN 978-90-04-67738-8.
