= 1995 Azerbaijani constitutional referendum =

A constitutional referendum was held in Azerbaijan on 12 November 1995 alongside the first round of parliamentary elections. Voters were asked to vote for or against a constitutional draft publicly released several days before the referendum.

Voters were asked the question,

Do you agree to the adoption of the draft of the first national Constitution of the Azerbaijan Republic, presented by the Commission headed by the President of the Azerbaijani Republic, Heydar Aliyev, which has prepared the draft of the new constitution of the Republic of Azerbaijan?

The result was 93% in favour of the adoption of the draft, with voter turnout reported to be 86%.

== Results ==
Choice	Votes	%
For		93.3
Against		6.7
Total		
Total votes	3,556,277	–
Registered voters/turnout	4,132,600	86.05
Source: Nohlen et al.
