= Azerbaijani nationalism =

Flag of Azerbaijan

Azerbaijani nationalism (Azerbaijani: Azərbaycan milliyətçiliyi), also referred to as Azerbaijanism (Azerbaijani: Azərbaycançılıq) originated in the early 20th century, in particular with the Russian Revolution of 1905.

Azerbaijani nationalism is characterized by irredentist and expansionist territorial claims to regions in Iran, Nagorno-Karabakh, and Armenia.

== Characterization ==
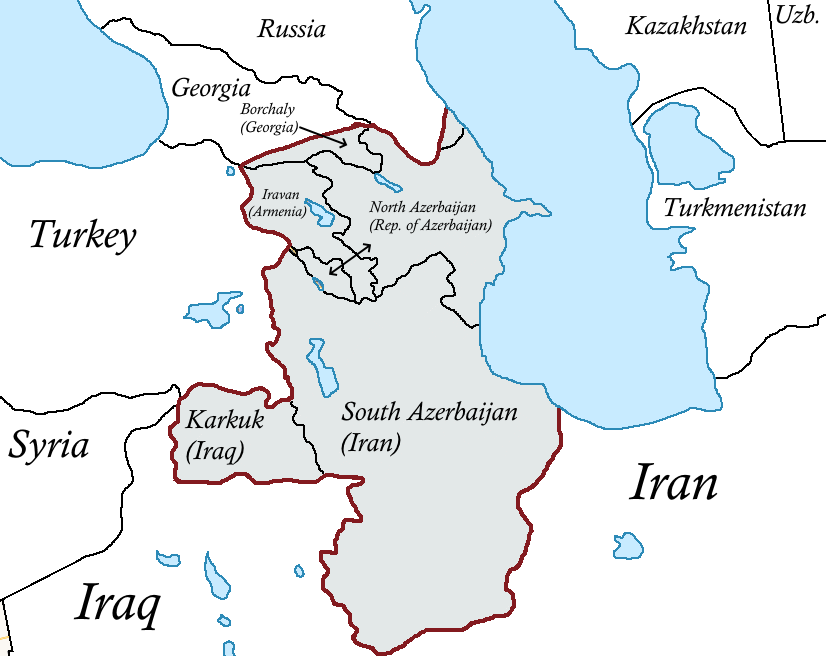
Map of Whole Azerbaijan according to Azerbaijani historian Adalet Tahirzade

Azerbaijani nationalism is characterized by irredentism, expansionism, and a sense of victimization. The belief that Azerbaijanis have been and continue to be victims of Iranians and Armenians is planted in children through state-sponsored propaganda and indoctrination in schools. Thus, to create a sense of national identity, particularly among the younger generations, Azerbaijani nationalism mixes their story of victimization with a depiction of the Armenian opponent.

The Government of Azerbaijan has advanced expansionist territorial claims to internationally recognized sovereign territories, including regions of Iran and significant portions, up to and including the entirety, of Armenia. These claims have been promoted under various labels, such as "Greater Azerbaijan," "Whole Azerbaijan," "Southern Azerbaijan," Expansionist claims targeting specifically Armenian territory include the "Goyche-Zangezur Republic," the "Republic of Irevan," "the Great Return", the "Zangezur Corridor," and "Western Azerbaijan."

== Background ==
Historically, the name "Azerbaijan" referred to the region south of the Aras River, in present-day northwestern Iran. The historical name of the present-day Republic of Azerbaijan was Arran and Shirvan. Azerbaijani national consciousness is a recent development. Before the 20th century, the Azerbaijanis barely constituted as an ethnic group, much less a nation. The people who lived in the present-day country of Azerbaijan identified as either Muslims of the ummah (community), or Turks, who shared a language family spread out throughout a considerable portion of Central Asia, or as Persians. Unlike the Armenians and the Georgians, they employed the Persian alphabet as they lacked their own.

Azerbaijani nationalism became more prominent in the aftermath of the Russian Revolution of 1905. Educational, theatrical, and artistic associations were established that promoted Azerbaijani nationalism. Books and other publications in the native language were increasingly published amid a more relaxed censorship regime. At the time, the nationalist activism did not necessarily demarcate the nationalism as being Muslim, Turkic, or Azerbaijani.

The delayed emergence of Azerbaijani national identity has several causes. Persian culture dominated the area that would become modern-day Azerbaijan for the majority of its history, up until the 1820s. The region never formed a distinct, unified state before the Russians finished conquering it in 1828, and even when Iran ruled the area, the eastern part of the South Caucasus was composed of numerous feudal khanates. The ethnic diversity in many of these khanates posed another barrier to national unification. In October 1917, the people in Baku were still not interested in referring to the region in the south Caucasus as "Azerbaijan". The local populace was frequently included under terms such as Türk milleti and Qafqaziya müsalman Xalqi ("the Muslim people of the Caucasus"). Even the name of the first Constituent Assembly, which was founded on 29 April 1917 in Baku, was "General Assembly of the Caucasian Muslims". It was not until 1918 that the ethnonym and endonym "Azerbaijani" was employed in public speech. Azerbaijani national identity came together at a widespread level during the Soviet era as a result of their policies. Before the Soviet Union established its rule over Azerbaijan, there was no distinguishing Azerbaijani nationalism as a political and social force.

== History ==
=== In relation to Iran ===
==== Under the Soviet Union (1920–1991) ====
Location of the Azerbaijan Soviet Socialist Republic (red) within the Soviet Union

Modern Azerbaijani nationalism has its origins in Soviet-era historiography, with the exception of the Pan-Turkist agenda expressed during the October Revolution. The "indigenous history" of the Azerbaijani nation and the Nagorno-Karabakh conflict are specifically mentioned among "the tenets of this Soviet-nationalist mythology of Azerbaijani history and culture." Since 1918, political elites with pan-Turkist-oriented sentiments in the area that comprises the present-day Azerbaijan Republic have depended on the concept of ethnic nationalism to create an anti-Iranian sense of ethnicity among Iranian Azerbaijanis. Over the past century, Iranian nationalism has effectively dealt with the military, political, and argumentative threats aimed toward Iranian Azerbaijan. The Iranian Azerbaijanis exhibit stronger pro-Iranian and integrationist nationalist feelings and activities in contrast to the forceful nationalism seen in Azerbaijan. Prompted by the Soviets, Azerbaijani nationalists created an "Azerbaijani" alphabet to replace the Persian script in order to create an Azerbaijani national history and identity based on the territorial definition of a nation and to lessen the influence of Islam and Iran.

Several myths about Azerbaijan's history and its links with Iran were created between the time the Azerbaijan Democratic Republic was conquered by the Bolsheviks in 1920 and the period that its heritage reappeared as encouragement for the country's new nationalists in the 1980s. The development of Azerbaijan's post-Soviet identity has been substantially impacted by these myths. One myth was that the Turks were colonized and subjugated by the Persians. According to Eldar Mamedov, this "flies in the face of historical reality. It was the various Turko-Mongol groups that invaded Iran several times, killed millions of Iranians, and ruled over them for several centuries. If any colonization, including linguistic change, was done, it was by Turks." It was the Soviet Union who initially popularized the idea of "Persian colonialism" after it was forced to withdraw its forces from the Iranian province of Azerbaijan in 1946 due to its failure to establish an independent republic there. Another myth was of a united Azerbaijan that was "divided by treacherous Persians" was also established. However, a southern and a northern Azerbaijan are not mentioned in historical accounts. The existence of two Azerbaijans is not mentioned in any historical or geographical writings in either the Russian Empire or rest of Europe.

According to a more recent revisionist theory, Russia and Iran plotted to split up Azerbaijan in the 19th century. Commenting on this, Mamedov states that "Considering that Iran fought two devastating wars with Russia (1803–1813 and 1824–1828), the idea of a Russo-Iranian conspiracy against Azerbaijan is totally absurd." The claim is repeated by the Azerbaijani nationalist poet Bakhtiyar Vahabzadeh in his poem Gülüstan. Today, the majority of Azerbaijani nationalists hold this opinion. As a result, Azerbaijan's post-Soviet national identity is strongly anti-Iranian and primarily Turkocentric. It has been built in various ways to oppose Iran as "the other," not just as a country but also as a culture and historical entity. Nowadays, being Azerbaijani means rejecting any ties to Iran.

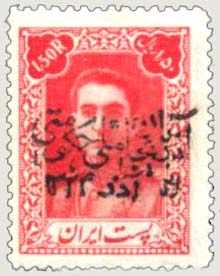
A overprinted Iranian stamp with the portrait of Mohammad Reza Pahlavi issued under the name of "National Government of Azerbaijan"

The Pan-Turkists' appeal to the unity of the Azerbaijani people was exploited by the Soviet authorities during World War II to weaken Iran. Together with the British, the Soviet Union invaded and conquered the northern portion of Iran in August–September 1941. Azerbaijanis made up a large portion of the Soviet contingent stationed in Iran. Soviet Azerbaijanis, particularly intellectuals from Baku, managed the Red Army's Chief Administration for Political Propaganda. It was here that the concepts to destabilize Iran were defined in two Soviet-sponsored publications, Vatan Yolunda ("On the Road to the Homeland") and Azärbayjan. In November 1945 the Soviets also assisted in the establishment of a puppet Azerbaijan People's Government in Iranian Azerbaijan. The government formally called for the "Nation of Azerbaijan" to have autonomy inside the borders of Iran. Nevertheless, its president Ja'far Pishevari occasionally made threats of independence against Iran.

The Azerbaijan People's Government collapsed in November 1946 as a result of the Soviet Union's (hesitant) departure from Iran, widespread local protests, and Iranian military intervention. Due to their failure of conquering Iranian Azerbaijan, Soviet historians started to refer the region as "South Azerbaijan", claiming it had been divided from "North Azerbaijan". The Azerbaijan Soviet Socialist Republic institutionalized what became the "Southern Question", which had multiple procedures and variants involved. In Soviet Azerbaijan, "progressive" Iranian Azerbaijani cultural and political émigrés were warmly received.

There were also published works by Soviet Azerbaijanis about the liberation fight of Iranian Azerbaijan. The Union of Azerbaijani Writers, in particular, printed the works of Iranian Azerbaijani writers and welcomed them with open arms. This association, together with the Azerbaijan Society for Cultural Relations with Foreign Countries, met together in December 1947 and discussed Iranian Azerbaijani literature. The Section on the History of Countries of the Foreign East was converted by the Presidium of the Academy of Sciences of the Soviet Union into an Iranian studies institute, which was eventually renovated and renamed the Institute of Oriental Studies. It was intended to examine liberation movements throughout the Middle East, with a focus on Iran in particular. To publish and research Iranian Azerbaijani literature, a separate branch was founded in the Nizami Institute of Literature of the Azerbaijan SSR Academy of Sciences in 1976.

In order to study the "Southern Question," academic departments were also established in Soviet Azerbaijan. Broadcasts targeting Iranian Azerbaijanis started in the middle of the 1950s. After 1975, both their material and tone become increasingly extreme. In general, priority was given to the Azerbaijan Writers Union when addressing the "Southern Question." According to Stephan H. Astourian; "suffice it here to state that the Soviets devised, cultivated, and promoted the theme of "Southern Azerbaijan"." The primary literary representation of the "Southern Question," aside from historical works, was the literature of "longing" (hasrät). Poetry, drama, and fiction lamented that the Aras river, which marked the border between the Soviet Union and Iran, and kept the Azerbaijanis apart from one another. Literature and history courses in Azerbaijan have incorporated these themes. Profoundly expressed anti-Iranian sentiment was a major consequence of this literary genre. The Soviet leadership tolerated this anti-Iranian sentiment and even supported it. There are three distinct periods to this literature and culture of "longing," which is also portrayed through music. Between 1941 and 1950, it evolved its primary symbols and style, and it became "politically and esthetically acceptable."

From 1950 to 1979, when the Pahlavi dynasty ruled Iran, historical discussions concerning the identity, geography, and language of the Azerbaijanis gained prominence in Soviet Azerbaijan. Any form of cooperation with Iran was extremely challenging for Soviet Azerbaijan, partly because of mutual mistrust and strict monitoring of phone and mail correspondence. Another major cause of mistrust between the two countries was the nationalism of Soviet Azerbaijan and its connections to irredentism in northern Iran. The poetry of "longing" blossomed in Azärbayjan and Ädäbiyyat vä İnjäsänät ("Literature and Longing") after the Pahlavi dynasty collapsed in 1979, signaling the beginning of a new era. For example, in June 1981, Heydar Aliyev, then the First Secretary of the Central Committee of the Azerbaijan Communist Party, spoke at the Seventh Congress of the Union of Azerbaijani Writers;

Comrades! I want to touch on one question. Writers from Southern Azerbaijan are working productively in the republic Writers Union. The leadership of the creative Union must always pay attention to them and disseminate their works both inside and outside the republic. Generally, we must think about strengthening literary relations with Southern Azerbaijan, developing broad relations in all sectors of cultural and spiritual creativity, and giving our comrades of the pen the rich esthetic-artistic experience which we have accumulated.

==== Republic of Azerbaijan (1991–present day) ====
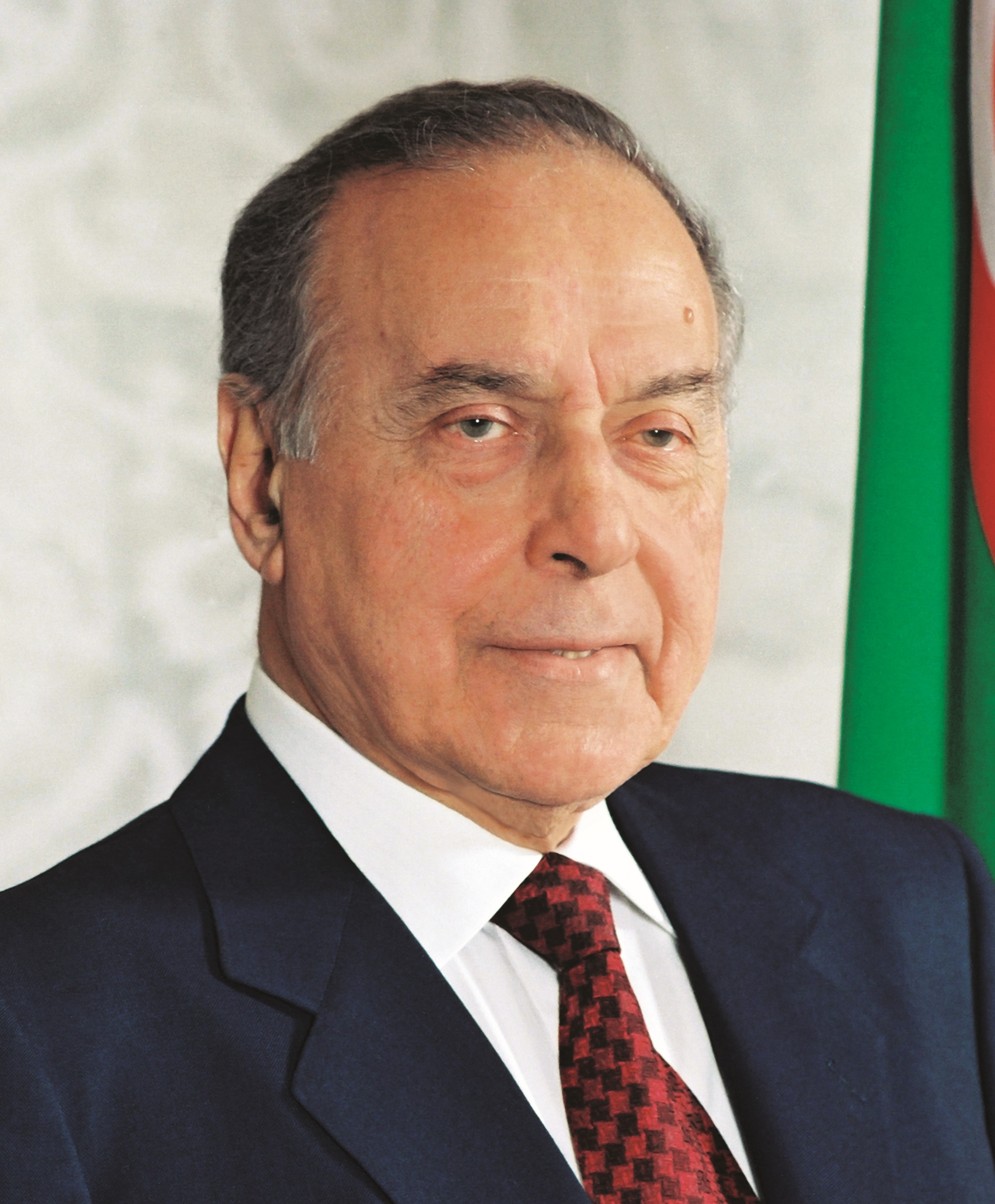
Heydar Aliyev, the third president of the Republic of Azerbaijan

Less passionate anti-Iranian sentiments were also made in Azerbaijan. Abulfaz Elchibey, the leader of the Azerbaijan Popular Front, made a statement about his pan-Turkist and anti-Russian views during his speech at the organization's first congress in July 1991, saying that "The reason why Iran is most frightened today is the idea of Turkism coming from the North." and "By taking an anti-Azerbaijan position, the Iranian Empire unites with the Russian Empire." The poet Balash Azaroglu showed anger at the Shah's policies against the learning of Azerbaijani language in his poems, which center on the lives of Iranian Azerbaijanis. Similar anger was displayed by Bakhtiyar Vahabzadeh toward Iranian Azerbaijanis mothers who failed to teach their kids their "mother tongue," questioning if they really deserved to be called mothers.

The pan-Turkist zeal was slightly reduced after Heydar Aliyev returned to power in June 1993 and Elchibey resigned as president. Aliyev recognized that extreme Turkification measures in Azerbaijan may antagonize the country's non-Turkic ethnic minorities (including groups such as the Talysh and Lezgins) as well as its educated Russian speakers, some of them being ethnic Azerbaijanis. He was also aware of how much these actions infuriated Russia and Iran. The broader notion of Azerbaijanism was used, which viewed Azerbaijan as a multi-ethnic nation contained inside internationally recognized borders. Reducing the pan-Turkist discourse did not, however, mean weakening Turkism, which remains a cornerstone of Azerbaijan's post-Soviet national identity and one of its primary efforts to build the nation. The idea of "uniting" "northern" and "southern Azerbaijan", and Ataturkist secularism are among the other tenets of APF philosophy that persist under the Aliyevs, albeit to differing degrees. Simultaneously, Azerbaijan is making large-scale attempts to eradicate any traces of Persian cultural influence. This includes removing Persian-written tiles from the Nizami Mausoleum, prohibiting the publication of Azerbaijani poets' works in their original Persian, and removing additional Persian inscriptions from historic structures. According to Mamedov; "Ironically, in creating a history and culture for Azerbaijan, its leaders have appropriated Iran’s historical and cultural heritage, while claiming for them a Turkic character."

The myth of "Azerbaijan being divided" between Russia and Iran, as well as irredentism toward "Southern" Azerbaijan, have been thoroughly included into the educational programs of Azerbaijani schools since the second part of the 1990s. While Heydar Aliyev's son and successor Ilham Aliyev has attempted to dismiss claims that his government is taking any anti-Iranian ethnic nationalist positions, the Iranian government and groups like Iranian nationalist circles, especially Iranian Azerbaijanis, are dubious about the intentions of the Azerbaijani government due to the ongoing actions of irredentist elements like Congress of World Azerbaijanis or Southern Azerbaijan National Awakening Movement and the support that they receive from Azerbaijani authorities, both state and non-state.

=== In relation to Armenia ===
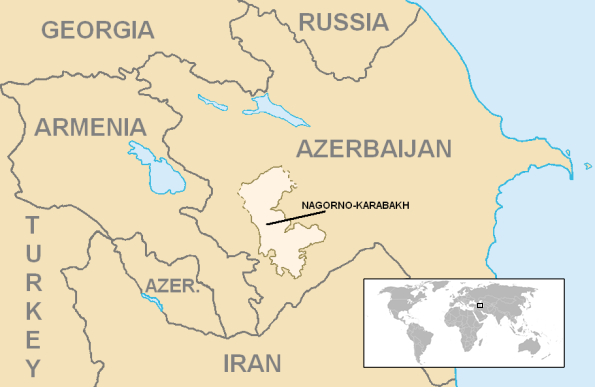
Location and extent of the former Nagorno-Karabakh Autonomous Oblast (lighter color)

Another fundamental component of Azerbaijani nationalism is anti-Armenian sentiment, which has its roots in past historical events and the Nagorno-Karabakh conflict. In Soviet Azerbaijan, anti-Armenian sentiment had already been well-established. The most important topic was Karabakh, which existed before the start of the Nagorno-Karabakh conflict in 1988. In two distinct ways, it is essential to the nationalistic narrative of Azerbaijan. The first is that Karabakh is the "birthplace of Azerbaijani culture, particularly music." The second is that the Armenians "wrongfully claim it as their own." Before 1988, Azerbaijani experts did not dispute the historical Armenian presence in Nagorno-Karabakh. In order to defend their government's anti-Armenian policies in Nagorno-Karabakh, Azerbaijani politicians, journalists, and academics asserted that the region had never been a part of historical Armenia and that the region's Armenian residents were immigrants who had slowly relocated there after 1828.

A strong degree of dislike is sometimes expressed toward Armenians. In 1991, Arif Mansurov, a member of the USSR Union of Journalists, published a book. It claimed that "the only people who have successfully assimilated Gypsies are the Armenians, who are of Semitic descent" and that "the greedy and terrified Armenians also have certain traits in common with Jews because of their Semitic features." Several historians from Azerbaijan also participate in spreading of this negative image of Armenians. Baxtiyar Nacafov summarized some of the main points of his book in an interview with the newspaper Millät on the day of the publication of his book titled "The Face of the Enemy: the History of Armenian Nationalism in Transcaucasia at the End of the 19th and the Beginning of the 20th Century": "Armenians are the enemies of humanity and akin to parasites"; "Armenian nationalism is worse than Nazism"; "the Armenian Genocide is a fiction"; "actually, Armenians committed genocide against the Azerbaijanis."

This portrayal of Armenians has become a norm in Azerbaijani history textbooks. In less than 400 pages, the history textbook for fifth graders refers to Armenians as the "enemy" 187 times. They are described as "bandits," "cunning," "treacherous," or "bloody." They are also described as "infidels in black robes", thus stereotyping them in a religious way as well. Nine chapters in history textbooks for grades ten and eleven discuss Armenians. Words like "terrorist," "fascist," "bandit," "separatist," "barbarism," or "nasty" are associated with them.

Azerbaijan's anti-Armenian sentiment sparked a process that mimicked what Armenia went through. Thus, on March 26, 1998, Heydar Aliyev, the President of the Republic of Azerbaijan, issued a law designating March 31 as the "Day of Genocide of Azerbaijanis" each year. The date alludes to the civil war known as March Days, which broke out in Baku at the end of March 1918 between the Musavat Party and the Caucasian Native Cavalry Division and the Bolsheviks and the Armenian Revolutionary Federation. Throughout this struggle, thousands of Tatars lost their lives. Azerbaijan has also accused Armenia of genocide for death of several hundred Azerbaijanis in the town of Khojaly at the end of February 1992.

Furthermore, the websites of the "Administrative Department of the President of the Republic of Azerbaijan" claim that 150,000 Azerbaijanis who were living in Soviet Armenia were forcibly relocated to Soviet Azerbaijan by the Armenians between 1948 and 1953. However, in reality the reason for this relocation was due to a joint request made to Joseph Stalin on 3 December 1947 by Mir Jafar Baghirov and Grigory Arutinov, the leaders of the Communist parties in Azerbaijan and Armenia, respectively. This resettlement was intended to provide land in Armenia for thousands of diasporan returning employees while simultaneously advancing cotton production in the Mingachevir area of Azerbaijan, where there was a lack of workers.

This official victimhood story is coupled with a commemorating culture. Azerbaiijan has been pushing for the world to remember what it considers to be genocide since 1998. In order to draw attention to the hardship of Azerbaijanis, numerous websites have also been created.

Laurence Broers, the Caucasus program director at Conciliation Resources explains replication of dynamics previously characterizing the line of contact around Nagorno-Karabakh along the internationally recognized Armenian-Azerbaijani borders in the political context of Azerbaijan's effort to enforce peace on its terms after its victory in the 2020 Nagorno-Karabakh War, imposing a set of territorial claims articulated with increasing intensity since May 2021. He sees the deployment of Azerbaijani troops to pockets of Armenia's territory along the border between the two states as "borderization": the transformation of a line of actual control into an international border, or a future concession in a coercive bargaining game. Another set of claims concerns Soviet-era exclaves – three Azerbaijani exclaves in Armenia and an Armenian one in Azerbaijan – which were de facto incorporated into the surrounding state during conflict in the 1990s.

The largest claim however, is the revival of a historical territorial designation for the region of Zangezur as a lost Azerbaijani ethno-space, deriving the concept from the name of a Zangezur uyezd (the right of transit across southern Armenia outlined in 2020 Nagorno-Karabakh ceasefire agreement is widely referred to in Azerbaijan as the Zangezur corridor, which Azerbaijani President Ilham Aliyev has threatened to take by force if not willingly given. On July 7, 2021, Azerbaijan reorganized its internal economic regions creating a new region bordering Syunik called "Eastern Zangezur", implying that there is a "Western Zangezur" – that is, Syunik).

== Sources ==
- Ahmadi, Hamid (2016). "The Clash of Nationalisms: Iranian Response to Baku's Irredentism". In Kamrava, Mehran (ed.). The Great Game in West Asia: Iran, Turkey and the South Caucasus. Oxford University Press. pp. 102–140. ISBN 978-0190673604.
- Ahmadoghlu, Ramin (2020). "Secular nationalist revolution and the construction of the Azerbaijani identity, nation and state". Nations and Nationalism. 27 (2). Wiley: 548–565. doi:10.1111/nana.12682.
- Astourian, Stephan H. (2023). "Origins, Main Themes and Underlying Psychological Disposition of Azerbaijani Nationalism". In Dorfmann-Lazarev, Igor; Khatchadourian, Haroutioun (eds.). Monuments and Identities in the Caucasus Karabagh, Nakhichevan and Azerbaijan in Contemporary Geopolitical Conflict. Brill. pp. 206–236. ISBN 978-90-04-67738-8.
- Atabaki, Touraj (2001). "Recasting Oneself, Rejecting the Other: Pan-Turkism and Iranian Nationalism". In van Schendel, Willem; Zürcher, Erik J. (eds.). Identity Politics in Central Asia and the Muslim World: Nationalism, Ethnicity and Labour in the Twentieth Century. I.B. Tauris. pp. 65–84. ISBN 978-1860642616.
- Behrooz, Maziar (2023). Iran at War: Interactions with the Modern World and the Struggle with Imperial Russia. I.B. Tauris. ISBN 978-0-7556-3737-9.
- Bennigsen, Alexandre; Wimbush, S. Enders (1986). Muslims of the Soviet Empire: A Guide. Indiana University Press. ISBN 978-0253339584.
- Bournoutian, George (2011). The 1823 Russian Survey of the Karabagh Province. A Primary Source on the Demography and Economy of Karabagh in the First Half of the 19th Century. Mazda Publishers. ISBN 978-1-56859-173-5.
- Bournoutian, George (2016). The 1820 Russian Survey of the Khanate of Shirvan: A Primary Source on the Demography and Economy of an Iranian Province prior to its Annexation by Russia. Gibb Memorial Trust. ISBN 978-1909724808.
- Bournoutian, George (2018). Armenia and Imperial Decline: The Yerevan Province, 1900–1914. Milton Park, Abingdon, Oxon: Routledge. ISBN 978-1-351-06260-2. OCLC 1037283914.
- Bournoutian, George (2021). From the Kur to the Aras: A Military History of Russia's Move into the South Caucasus and the First Russo-Iranian War, 1801–1813. Brill. ISBN 978-90-04-44515-4.
- Broers, Laurence (2019). Armenia and Azerbaijan: Anatomy of a Rivalry. Edinburgh University Press. ISBN 978-1-4744-5052-2.
- Entessar, N. (1993). "Azeri Nationalism in the Former Soviet Union and Iran". In Young, Crawford (ed.). The Rising Tide of Cultural Pluralism: The Nation-state at Bay?. University of Wisconsin Press. ISBN 978-0299138806.
- Fowkes, B. (2002). Ethnicity and Ethnic Conflict in the Post-Communist World. Springer. ISBN 978-0-333-79256-8.
- Gasimov, Zaur (2022). "Observing Iran from Baku: Iranian Studies in Soviet and Post-Soviet Azerbaijan". Iranian Studies. 55 (1). Cambridge University: 37–59. doi:10.1080/00210862.2020.1865136.
- Mamedov, Eldar (2017). "Azerbaijan Twenty-Five Years after Independence: Accomplishments and Shortcomings". In Hunter, Shireen T. (ed.). The New Geopolitics of the South Caucasus: Prospects for Regional Cooperation and Conflict Resolution. Lexington Books. pp. 27–64. ISBN 978-1498564960.
- Morozova, Irina (2005). "Contemporary Azerbaijani Historiography on the Problem of "Southern Azerbaijan" after World War II". Iran and the Caucasus. 9 (1): 85–120. doi:10.1163/1573384054068114.
- Multiple authors (1987). "Azerbaijan". In Yarshater, Ehsan (ed.). Encyclopædia Iranica. Vol. III/2: Awāʾel al-maqālāt–Azerbaijan IV. London and New York: Routledge & Kegan Paul. pp. 205–257. ISBN 978-0-71009-114-7.
