= 1992 Azerbaijani presidential election =

- 7 June 1992
Nominee	Abulfaz Elchibey	Nizami Suleymanov
Party	Popular Front	DUIA
Popular vote	1,829,448	1,017,217
Percentage	60.87%	33.84%
President before election
Isa Gambar
Musavat Party
Elected President
Abulfaz Elchibey
Popular Front

Presidential elections were held in Azerbaijan on 7 June 1992. The elections were the first in Azerbaijan in more than seventy years not held under communist control and featured the unprecedented use of television, posters, and other media by multiple candidates to communicate platforms and solicit votes.

The candidates included Azerbaijani Popular Front Party leader Abulfaz Elchibey, former parliament speaker Yaqub Mamedov, Movement for Democratic Reforms leader and Minister of Justice Ilyas Ismayilov, National Democratic Group leader Rafig Abdullayev, and Union of Democratic Intelligentsia candidate Nizami Suleymanov. Two other candidates, representing the Azerbaijan National Independence Party and the Popular Front Party, withdrew from the race during the campaign. Elchibey received 61% of the more than three million votes cast. The runner-up, Nizami Suleymanov, received a surprising 34% of the vote by promising Azerbaijanis instant wealth and victory in Nagorno-Karabakh. No other candidate received more than 5% of the vote.

The election of Elchibey, a Soviet dissident who had been imprisoned by the KGB in the 1970s, signaled a break in Communist Party dominance of Azerbaijani politics. The elections have since been described as the only competitive election in Azerbaijan's post-Soviet history.

== Electoral system ==
To register, each candidate had to collect at least 20,000 signatures and present them to the Central Election Commission. Heydar Aliyev was unable to run because of a constitutional provision barring candidates over sixty-five years of age.

== Campaign ==
During the campaign, Elchibey pledged to implement constitutional, economic, and cultural reforms. His top domestic policy priorities, the creation of a national army and a national currency backed by gold reserves, were seen as necessary elements for national sovereignty.

Etibar Mammadov, Elchibey's main rival in the polls, dropped out of the race a few days before the election, calling for rule by a coalition government and the postponement of balloting until Azerbaijan's active conflict with Armenia ended.

== Results ==
Candidate	Party	Votes	%
Abulfaz Elchibey	Azerbaijani Popular Front Party	1,829,448	60.86
Nizami Suleymanov	Democratic Union of the Intelligentsia of Azerbaijan	1,017,217	33.84
Yaqub Mamedov	Independent	51,144	1.70
Ilyas Ismayilov	Social Movement for Democratic Reform in Azerbaijan	20,216	0.67
Rafig Abdullayev	People's Republic Party	15,646	0.52
Against all		72,099	2.40
Total		3,005,770	100.00
Valid votes		3,005,770	97.07
Invalid/blank votes		90,707	2.93
Total votes		3,096,477	100.00
Source: Nohlen et al.

== Aftermath ==
Despite the new president's intentions, the war in Nagorno-Karabakh dominated politics, and Elchibey and his party steadily lost influence and popular appeal because of continual military losses, a worsening economy, political stalemate, and government corruption.
