= 1993 Azerbaijani presidential election =

- 3 October 1993
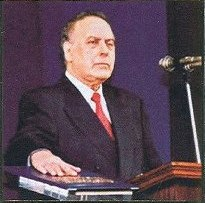

Nominee	Heydar Aliyev	Kerar Abilov
Party	New Azerbaijan	United Azerbaijan
Popular vote	3,919,923	40,298
President before election
Heydar Aliyev
New Azerbaijan
Elected President
Heydar Aliyev
New Azerbaijan

Presidential elections were held in Azerbaijan on 3 October 1993, nearly four months after the June 1993 coup d'état. The result was a victory for incumbent president Heydar Aliyev of the New Azerbaijan Party, who won with nearly 99% of the vote. Election monitors characterized the elections as neither free nor fair.

Voter turnout was reported to be 98%.

== Results ==
Candidate	Party	Votes	%
Heydar Aliyev	New Azerbaijan Party	3,919,923	
Kerar Abilov	United Azerbaijan Party	40,298	
Zakir Tağıyev	Azerbaijan Endeavour Party		
None of the above			
Total			
Total votes		3,966,327	–
Registered voters/turnout			97.6
Source: Nohlen et al.
