= Heydar Aliyev =

President of Azerbaijan from 1993 to 2003

- Heydər Əliyev
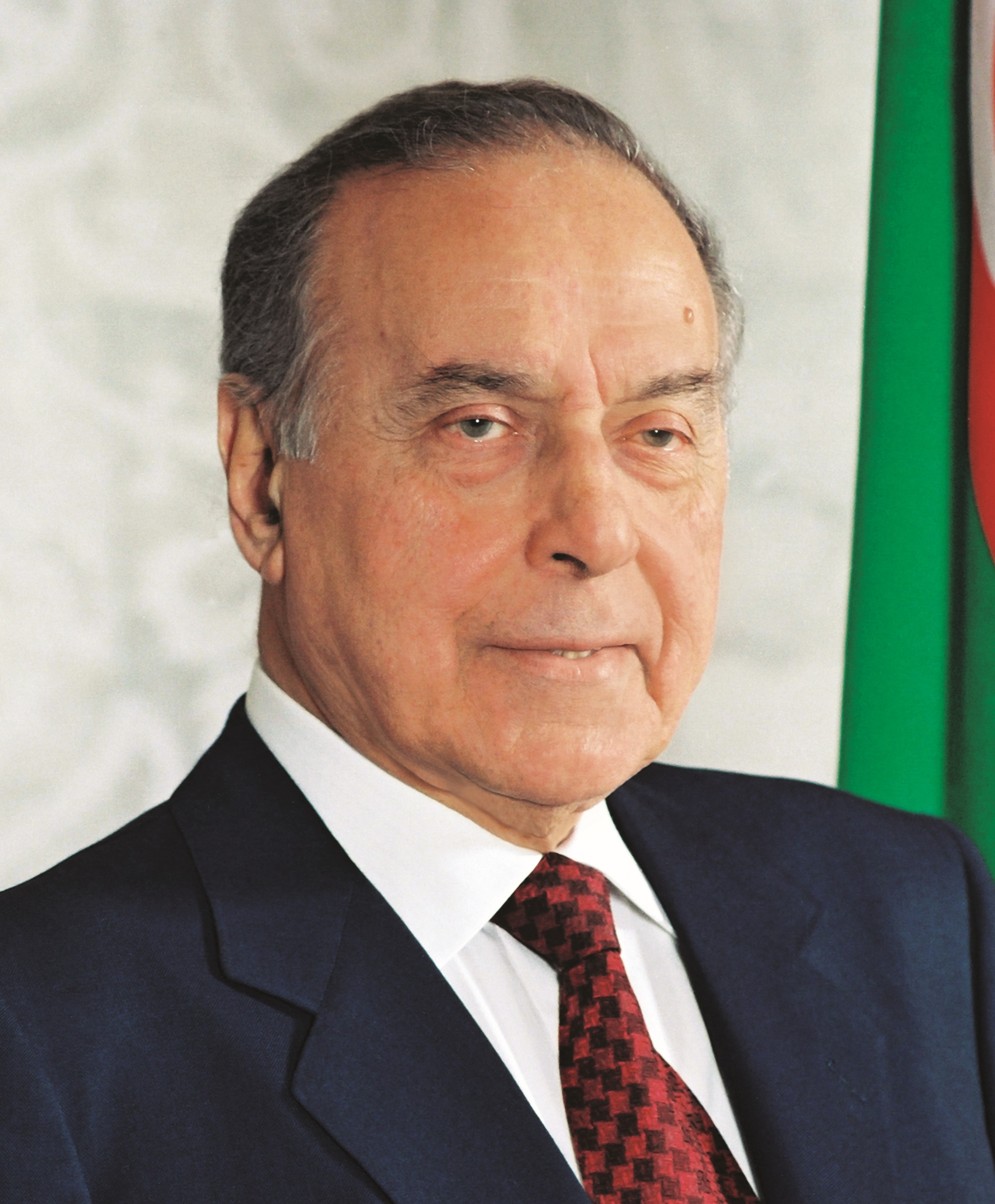
- Official portrait, c. 1993-2003

3rd President of Azerbaijan
- In office 24 June 1993 (Note: Acting: 24 June – 10 October 1993) – 31 October 2003
- Prime Minister: Surat Huseynov; Fuad Guliyev; Artur Rasizade; Ilham Aliyev
- Preceded by: Abulfaz Elchibey
- Succeeded by: Ilham Aliyev

Chairman of the Supreme Soviet of Azerbaijan
- In office 15 June 1993 – 5 November 1993
- President: Abulfaz Elchibey; Himself
- Prime Minister: Surat Huseynov; Fuad Guliyev
- Preceded by: Isa Gambar
- Succeeded by: Rasul Guliyev

Chairman of the Supreme Assembly of the Nakhchivan Autonomous Republic
- In office 3 September 1991 – 9 October 1993
- Preceded by: Position established
- Succeeded by: Vasif Talibov

First Deputy Chairman of the Council of Ministers of the Soviet Union
- In office 24 November 1982 – 23 October 1987 Serving with Ivan Arkhipov (1982–1986); Andrei Gromyko (1983–1985); Nikolai Talyzin (1985–1987); Vsevolod Murakhovsky (1985–1987)
- President: Vasili Kuznetsov (acting); Yuri Andropov; Vasili Kuznetsov (acting); Konstantin Chernenko; Vasili Kuznetsov (acting); Andrei Gromyko
- Premier: Nikolai Tikhonov; Nikolai Ryzhkov

Full member of the 26th, 27th Politburo
- In office 22 November 1982 – 21 October 1987

First Secretary of the Central Committee of the Azerbaijan Communist Party
- In office 14 July 1969 – 3 December 1982
- Preceded by: Veli Akhundov
- Succeeded by: Kamran Baghirov

Candidate member of the 25th, 26th Politburo
- In office 5 March 1976 – 22 November 1982

Personal details
- Born: Heydar Alirza oğlu Aliyev; 10 May 1923 Nakhchivan, Azerbaijan SSR, Transcaucasian SFSR, Soviet Union
- Died: 12 December 2003 (aged 80) Cleveland, Ohio, U.S.
- Resting place: Alley of Honor
- Party: Communist Party of the Soviet Union (1945–1991); New Azerbaijan Party (1992–2003)
- Spouse: Zarifa Aliyeva (m. 1948; died 1985)
- Children: Sevil Aliyeva; Ilham Aliyev
- Education: Baku State University
- Awards: Hero of Socialist Labour (twice)

Military service
- Allegiance: Soviet Union
- Branch/service: Committee for State Security of the Azerbaijan Soviet Socialist Republic
- Years of service: 1941–1969
- Rank: Major General
- Battles/wars: Second World War; Eastern Front

Heydar Alirza oghlu Aliyev (Note: Azerbaijani: Heydər Əlirza oğlu Əliyev (Latin) Һејдәр Әлирза оғлу Әлијев (Cyrillic) IPA: [hejˈdæɾ æliɾˈzɑ oɣˈlu æˈlijef] Russian: Гейда́р Али́евич Али́ев, romanized: Geydar Aliyevich Aliyev IPA: [ɡʲɪjˈdar ɐˈlʲijɪvʲɪtɕ ɐˈlʲijɪf]) (10 May 1923 – 12 December 2003) was an Azerbaijani politician who was a Soviet party boss in the Azerbaijan Soviet Socialist Republic from 1969 to 1982, and the third president of Azerbaijan from 1993 to 2003.

He was a high-ranking official in the KGB of the Azerbaijan SSR, serving for 28 years in Soviet state security organs (1941–1969). He governed Soviet Azerbaijan from 1969 to 1982 as First Secretary of the Communist Party of Azerbaijan. He held the post of First Deputy Premier of the Soviet Union from 1982 to 1987. He rose through the ranks due to his close associations with Leonid Brezhnev and Yuri Andropov.

Aliyev was installed as president of Azerbaijan after the 1993 military coup ousted President Abulfaz Elchibey. Elchibey was a prominent Soviet dissident and Azerbaijani nationalist leader who had been elected as president in independent Azerbaijan's first free election in 1992. Aliyev's installation as president put an end to Azerbaijan's short post-independence democratic interlude. Shortly after taking charge, Aliyev organized a presidential election where he won nearly 99% of the vote.

His regime in Azerbaijan has been described as dictatorial, authoritarian, and repressive. He was also said to have run a heavy-handed police state where elections were rigged and dissent was repressed. A cult of personality developed around Aliyev, which has continued after his death in 2003. Shortly before his death, his son Ilham Aliyev was elected president in a fraudulent election and continues to lead Azerbaijan to this day.

== Career in the Soviet era ==
=== Early life ===
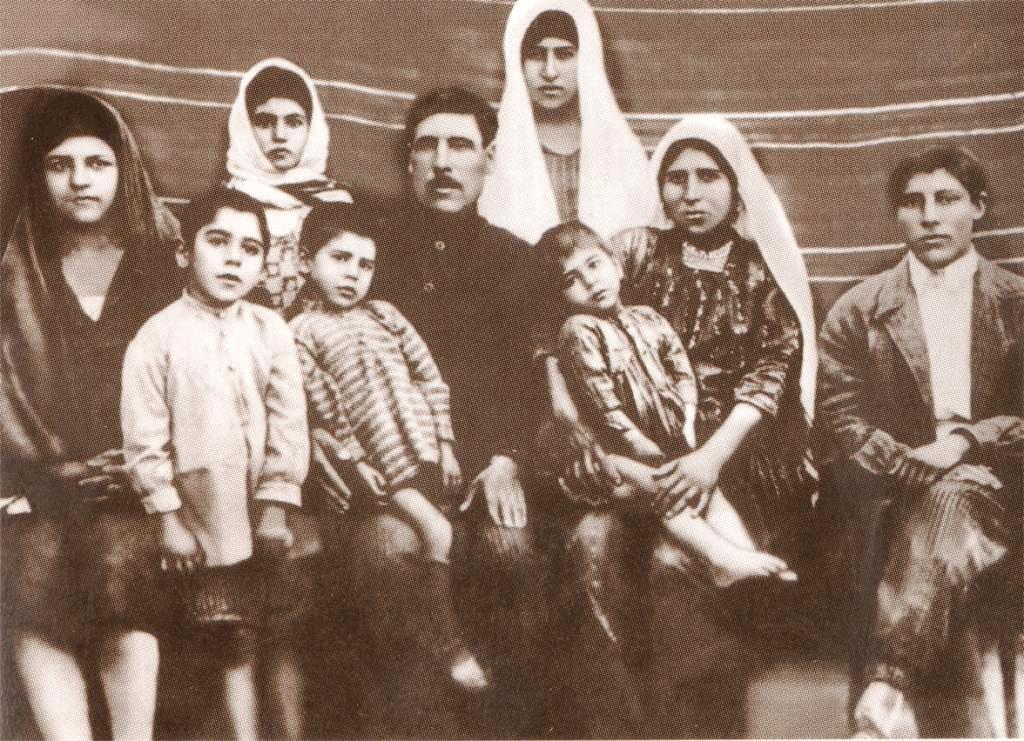
Heydar Aliyev with his family in 1920s

According to both his official biography and the Great Soviet Encyclopedia, Aliyev was born on 10 May 1923 in the city of Nakhchivan. His family had moved to Nakhchivan before his birth from the village of Comardlı (modern-day Tanahat in the Syunik Province of Armenia), located only a few miles from Nakhchivan. Some sources claim that Aliyev was actually born 2 years earlier in Comardlı, but that it was later decided that a senior Azerbaijani politician should not have an Armenian place of birth. His father was from Comardlı and his mother was from Vorotan (also in modern-day Syunik Province of Armenia). Aliyev had four brothers: Hasan, Huseyn, Jalal, and Agil, as well as three sisters: Sura, Shafiga and Rafiga.

After graduating from the Nakhchivan Pedagogical School, Aliyev attended the Azerbaijan Industrial Institute (now the Azerbaijan State Oil and Industry University) from 1939 to 1941, where he studied architecture. In 1949 and 1950, he studied at the USSR Ministry of State Security Higher School in Leningrad. Aliyev's official biography also states that he studied at Baku State University, graduating with a degree in history in 1957. According to American journalist Pete Earley, Aliyev first attended the Ministry of State Security Academy in Leningrad and graduated in 1944. He also took Senior Staff Professional Development courses at the Dzerzhinsky Higher School of the KGB in Moscow in 1966.

In 1948, Aliyev married Zarifa Aliyeva. On 12 October 1955, their daughter Sevil Aliyeva was born. On 24 December 1961, their son Ilham was born. Zarifa Aliyeva died of cancer in 1985.

=== Early career ===
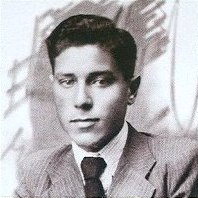
Young Heydar Aliyev

During World War II, he served as commander of a Smersh battalion, which conducted intelligence operations on the Soviet Union's own forces and executed soldiers who deserted or fought insufficiently hard.

He joined the Azerbaijan SSR People's Commissariat for State Security (NKGB) in 1944 and proceeded to become the department head of the State Security Committee of Azerbaijan SSR in 1950, after he graduated from the Senior Staff Training School of the USSR State Security Committee.

In 1954, as part of a government reform, the NKGB, which was previously named the Ministry of State Security (MGB), was again renamed, this time as the KGB. Sources point to Aliyev working in the Azerbaijani KGB's Eastern Division, which included Iran and the Middle East. During this time, Aliyev was a close associate of Semyon Tvsigun. Aliyev became head of the Azerbaijani KGB in 1960 and eventually received the rank of major general. During his time in Soviet Secret Service, Aliyev was mostly unknown in Azerbaijan.

== From KGB to leader of Azerbaijan SSR ==
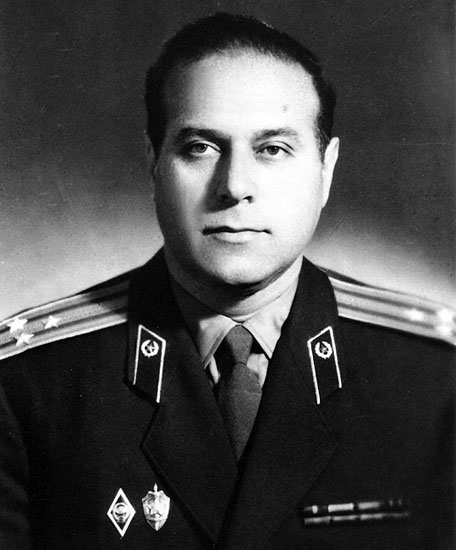
Aliyev in his KGB uniform

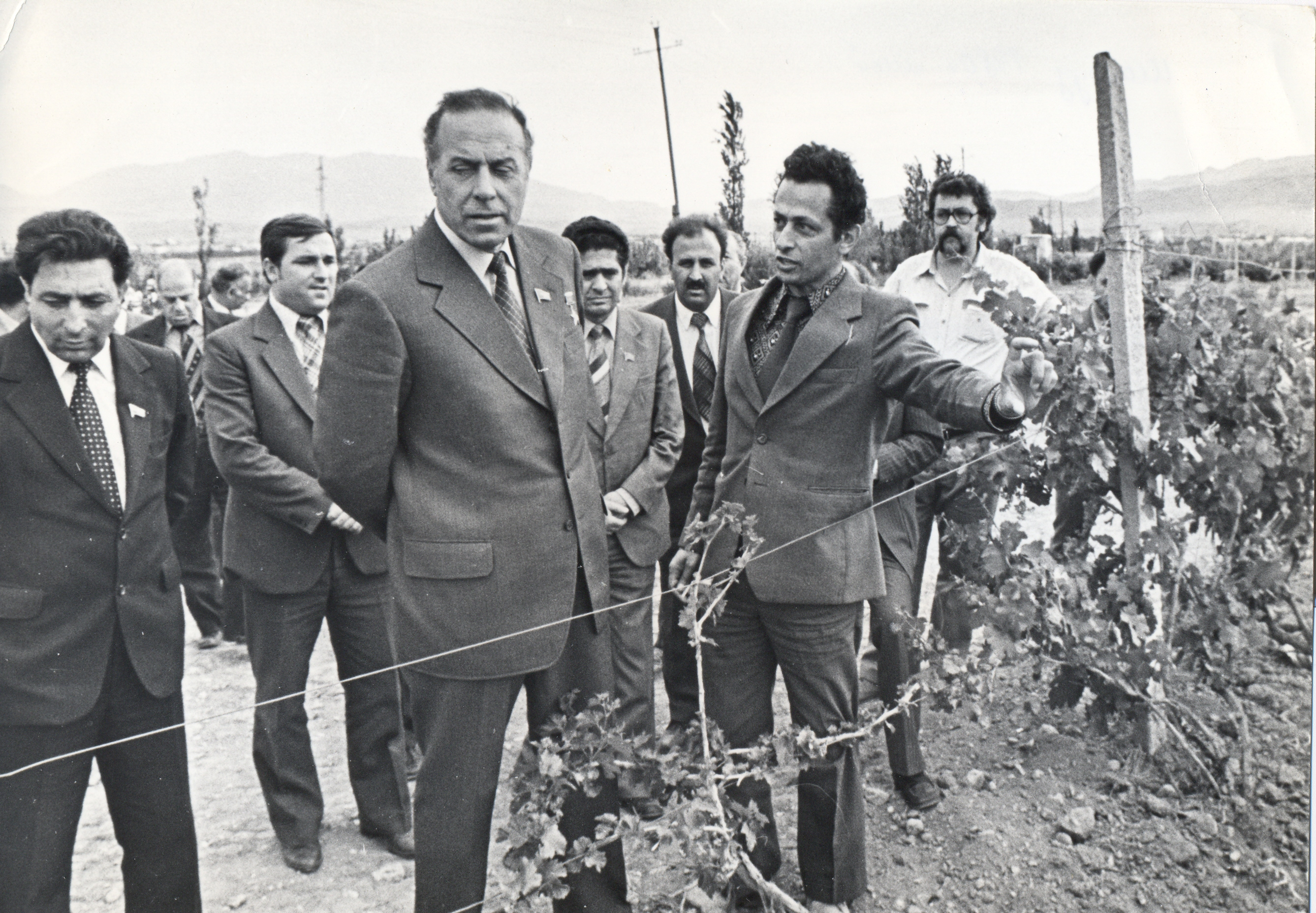
Aliyev during his visit to a state collective farm in 70s

Aliyev was elected First Secretary of the Central Committee of the Azerbaijan Communist Party at its Plenary Session held on 12 July 1969. He was reportedly selected for the job by Brezhnev after his friend Semyon Tsvigun, Brezhnev's brother-in-law, advocated for Aliyev's selection.

Aliyev subsequently dominated affairs in Soviet-era Azerbaijan. Described as the "Monarch of Azerbaijan", Aliyev established an extensive patronage network across Azerbaijan and profited on the black market. According to Harold James Perkin, Aliyev was "surrounded by female ‘volunteers’ whose services were mainly sexual."

In his obituary, The Washington Post wrote, "He made a name for himself by smashing local mafia groups, but his personal circle moved in to profit off oil, caviar and other sectors." Aliyev was selective in his anti-corruption campaign, as he targeted those that refused to cooperate with him but rewarding and elevating those that did.

Aliyev frequently treated Brezhnev with lavish gifts. The gifts included a ‘Sun-king’ diamond ring worth 226,000 roubles and a jewel-encrusted framed portrait of Brezhnev. Aliyev built a palace for Brezhnev's personal use for his official visit in 1982.

He promoted individuals from his native Nakhichevan to leadership positions in the Azerbaijan SSR. He also promoted Azerbaijani culture and language.

In the early 1980s, Aliyev barred the children of certain legal personnel from attending the republic's law school, in a purported effort to curb a self-perpetuating elite based on corruption.

Aliyev was subsequently promoted to the Moscow Politburo in 1976.

== Career in Moscow ==
Aliyev became a candidate (non-voting) member of the Soviet Politburo in 1976. He held this position until December 1982, when Yuri Andropov promoted him to the office of First Deputy Chairman of the USSR Council of Ministers and made him a full member of the Politburo. Aliyev also served at the Council of Ministers as the first deputy chairman in 1974–1979.

Aliyev supported the Soviet invasion of Afghanistan in 1979. At the 1981 Party Congress, Aliyev praised Brezhnev profusely.

On 22 November 1982, Andropov promoted Aliyev from a candidate to a full member of the Soviet Politburo and appointed him to the post of First Deputy Chairman of the Council of Ministers of the USSR, responsible for transportation and social services. Aliyev thus attained the highest position ever reached by an Azerbaijani in the Soviet Union.

Aliyev was dismissed from his position as First Deputy Premier and from the Politburo by Mikhail Gorbachev in 1987, officially on health grounds, but the two had fallen out over Gorbachev's anti-corruption campaign. Aliyev had fallen out with Gorbachev and was one of the old guard cleared out as part of Gorbachev's Perestroika.

== Fall and re-invention ==
After his forced retirement in 1987, Aliyev remained in Moscow until 1990. He suffered a heart attack during this time. Aliyev publicly opposed the January 1990 Soviet military crackdown in Baku, which had followed the continuing conflict regarding Nagorno-Karabakh.

Almost immediately after this public appearance, Aliyev left Moscow for his native Nakhchivan. There, Aliyev reinvented himself as a moderate nationalist. He was elected the Supreme Soviet of Azerbaijan SSR in Baku in October 1990. Under the pressure and criticism from groups connected to his nemesis, the leader of Soviet Azerbaijan Ayaz Mutallibov, Aliyev again returned to Nakhchivan, where he was elected Chairman of the Supreme Soviet of Nakhchivan in 1991. He resigned that same year from the Communist Party of the Soviet Union.

By December 1991, when the Soviet Union dissolved and Azerbaijan formally became an independent state, Aliyev independently governed Nakhchivan in spite of Mutallibov's presidency. Early 1992 saw increased violence in the First Nagorno-Karabakh War following the fall of Shusha, the last Azerbaijani-populated town in Nagorno-Karabakh. These events resulted in Mutallibov's resignation and the subsequent rise to power of the Azerbaijan Popular Front led by Abulfaz Elchibey. Elchibey was elected as president in Azerbaijan's first free and fair elections in 1992.

During Elchibey's one year in power, Aliyev continued to govern Nakhchivan without any deference to the official government in Baku. The attempt by the Popular Front's Minister of Interior Isgandar Hamidov to forcibly overthrow Aliyev in Nakhchivan was thwarted by local militia at the regional airport. During the same period, Aliyev independently negotiated a cease-fire agreement in Nakhchivan with the then-President of Armenia, Levon Ter-Petrosyan.

Aliyev was elected as the leader of New Azerbaijan Party at its constituent congress organized in Nakhchivan on 21 November 1992.

=== 1993 Azerbaijani coup ===
In 1993, Elchibey was ousted from power in a Russia-backed military coup led by Surat Huseynov, a military commander that Elchibey had fired. Aliyev was installed as President, and Aliyev in turn appointed Huseynov as prime minister. According to historian Audrey Altsadt and Thomas de Waal, Aliyev did not appear to have a direct role in the coup. In August 1993, Elchibey was stripped of his presidency by a nationwide referendum.

Aliyev disbanded 33 battalions loyal to Elchibey's Popular Front party. Amid this turmoil, Azerbaijan lost enormous swaths of territory to Armenia in the Nagorno-Karabakh conflict and had effectively lost the First Nagorno-Karabakh War.

== Presidency ==
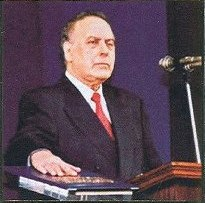
Aliyev during his inauguration

On 3 October 1993, Aliyev organized the 1993 Azerbaijani presidential election where he allowed two unknown candidates to run against him. He was elected President of the Republic of Azerbaijan with 98.8 percent of the vote. On 11 October 1998, he was re-elected, winning 77 percent of the vote.

=== Nagorno-Karabakh conflict ===
==== Final year of war ====
When Aliyev became chairman of the Supreme Soviet in June 1993, Azerbaijan was suffering from internal division and military collapse, which allowed Armenian forces to capture most of five districts in the southwest of Azerbaijan without meeting significant resistance, leading to the displacement of around 350,000 people. After taking the office of president, Aliyev disbanded units loyal to the ousted Azerbaijani Popular Front and ordered the creation of a new national army. Tens of thousands of young men with no fighting experience were conscripted to this end. At the same time, Aliyev conducted negotiations with the Armenian side: he had already confidentially met with Karabakh Armenian leader Robert Kocharyan twice in Moscow soon before assuming the presidency, and Armenian and Azerbaijani representatives had agreed to prolong a ceasefire in September 1993. The negotiations bore no results and the ceasefire did not hold, however, and Armenian forces captured additional territories soon after Aliyev's inauguration. In the winter of 1993–1994, Azerbaijani forces attempted to recapture territories on different parts of the frontline. While Azerbaijani forces managed to recapture part of Fuzuli District, the operation to retake Kalbajar District was a disastrous failure, with thousands of Azerbaijani soldiers killed or frozen to death in the mountains north of Kalbajar.

==== 1994 ceasefire and peace negotiations ====
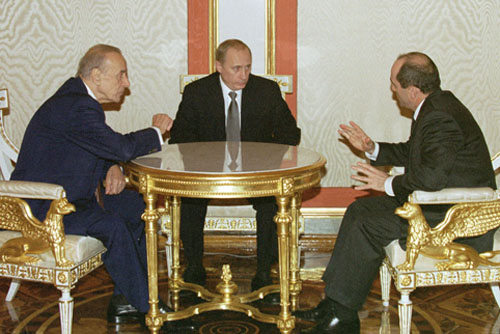
A meeting between Heydar Aliyev, Vladimir Putin and Robert Kocharyan in Kremlin on 30 November 2001

In May 1994, with Aliyev's approval, a ceasefire agreement was signed by representatives of Azerbaijan, Armenia and the breakaway Nagorno-Karabakh Republic, which successfully put an end to the hostilities in and around Nagorno-Karabakh. While agreeing to the ceasefire, Aliyev rejected Russian proposals to deploy a peacekeeping contingent to Nagorno-Karabakh. Following the ceasefire, Aliyev periodically engaged in negotiations with the Armenian side mediated by the OSCE Minsk Group and its co-chair countries (Russia, France and the United States) for the resolution of the Nagorno-Karabakh conflict. At the OSCE Lisbon Summit in December 1996, all of the OSCE member states except for Armenia signed a declaration affirming Azerbaijan's territorial integrity and stating that Nagorno-Karabakh's right to self-determination should be realized in the form of "the highest degree of self-rule within Azerbaijan".

Aliyev reportedly agreed to a "phased solution" to the conflict proposed by the Minsk Group co-chairs in September 1997, which envisioned the withdrawal of Armenian forces from occupied districts surrounding Nagorno-Karabakh (besides the Lachin District) and the deployment of international peacekeepers, followed by negotiations on the final status of Nagorno-Karabakh in subsequent phases; the proposal was never realized as Armenian president Levon Ter-Petrosyan failed to win support for it from his own government and was forced to resign in February 1998. Aliyev participated in bilateral talks with the new president of Armenia, Robert Kocharyan, in spring 1999 and again in January 2001. Further, more substantial talks were held in Key West, Florida with American mediation in April 2001. The proposals negotiated at Key West have never been published, although it is reported that Nagorno-Karabakh and the Lachin Corridor were to be effectively ceded to Armenia while Azerbaijan would regain the seven occupied districts and receive land access to Nakhchivan through Armenian territory. Despite initial reports that the two sides were closer than ever to coming to a final agreement, Aliyev, who is said to have met significant opposition to the conditions from his inner circle, declined to go forward with the agreement after returning to Azerbaijan. The Key West negotiations were the last major negotiations on the Nagorno-Karabakh conflict during Aliyev's presidency.

=== Domestic policy ===
==== Constitutional reform ====
Aliyev assembled the Constitutional Commission in June 1995 to create a constitution to replace the 1978 Azerbaijan SSR Constitution. The first draft was ready in October for public debate and the final version consisted of 5 chapters, 12 sections and 147 articles. The new constitution was confirmed by a referendum held on 12 November 1995. To ensure separation of power, the constitution created 3 divisions: legislative (Milli Majlis), executive (President) and judicial (courts).

Aliyev suggested amendments to the Constitution of Azerbaijan in June 2002. The first amendment to the Constitution of Azerbaijan was approved as the result of the 2002 Azerbaijani constitutional referendum, which was married by fraud. Consequently, 39 amendments to 23 articles of the Constitution of Azerbaijan were made. These included the abolition of proportional party-list elections to Parliament, a change in the presidential line of succession to favor the prime minister instead of the chairman of Milli Majlis, the favoring of a simple majority when calculating presidential election results, and the establishment of rights for citizens, courts and ombudsmen to appeal directly to the Constitutional Court of Azerbaijan.

==== Repression of veterans groups ====
Aliyev perceived the military as a threat to his rule. Many of the military commanders from the Nagorno-Karabakh conflict were imprisoned by his government. When war veterans from the Nagorno-Karabakh conflict protested against his government, the government arrested many of them and shut down the veterans rights organization.

==== Abolition of the death penalty ====
Aliyev requested the elimination of the death penalty on 3 February 1998. Milli Majlis approved the draft law on 10 February 1998. As a result, capital punishment was replaced with life imprisonment. Azerbaijan joined the "Second Optional Protocol to the International Covenant on Civil and Political Rights, aiming at the abolition of the death penalty" on 22 January 1999.

==== Agrarian and land reform ====
Agrarian reforms implemented during the Aliyev administration can be divided into 2 phases:

- 1995–1997 – During the first phase, the legislative base for an agrarian sector was reestablished through the adoption of a number of legislative documents. Privatization of Azerbaijani agriculture through the dissolution of the traditional collective and state farms was the focus of these laws. Examples of these laws include "the Basis of Agrarian Reform" (18 February 1995); "Reform of state and collective farms" (18 February 1995); and "Land Reform" (16 July 1996). On 10 January 1997 Aliyev issued a Decree on "Approval of some legal documents assuring implementation of agrarian reforms". The State Commission on Agrarian Reforms was formed by Aliyev on 2 March 1995.
- 1998–2001 – The second phase focused on post-privatization support and the removal of bureaucratic barriers for more effective implementation of these reforms. The Ministry of Agriculture was reorganized by a presidential decree dated 6 June 1998 (On Ratification of the Statue on the Ministry of Agriculture), the law on "State land cadaster, land monitoring and structure" (22 December 1998), a decree on "Land rent" (12 March 1999), and a law on "land market" (7 May 1999). The Land Code of Azerbaijani Republic was approved by the Law on "Approval of Land Code of the Republic of Azerbaijan" (25 June 1999).

=== Foreign policy ===
Aliyev travelled to various countries throughout his presidency.

==== Relations with the United Nations ====
During Aliyev's presidency, Azerbaijan began actively participating in international organizations such as the United Nations. Aliyev attended the 49th session of the UN General Assembly (UN GA) in 1994 and the special session of UN GA dedicated to the 50th anniversary of the United Nations in October 1995. He received former Secretary General of UN Boutros Boutros-Ghali in October 1994 in Baku. Aliyev met with Secretary General Kofi Annan during his trip to the US in 1997 July. Aliyev addressed the Millennium Summit of UN held in September 2000, where he talked about the Armenian invasion of Nagorno-Karabakh and adjacent regions, and mentioned UN resolutions 822, 853, 874, 884, which demanded unconditional withdrawal of the Armenian armed forces from the occupied Azerbaijani territories. After 11 September attacks, Azerbaijan joined the anti-terror coalition of UN and cooperated with Office of Counter-Terrorism and Sanctions Committee of the UN SC. In October 2001, Azerbaijan joined the International Convention for the Suppression of the Financing of Terrorism adopted by UN SC in 1999.

==== Relations with NATO ====
The Partnership for Peace (PfP) Framework Document was signed to enhance security and defense cooperation with NATO on 4 May 1994. Aliyev approved the PfP Presentation Document on 19 April 1996. In November 1997, Azerbaijan joined the PfP Planning and Review Process. NATO PA also made Azerbaijan an associate member of NATO in November.

==== Relations with the EU ====
The Partnership and Cooperation Agreement between the European Union and the Republic of Azerbaijan was signed in Luxembourg on 22 April 1996, and went into effect on 22 June 1999. It promises cooperation in the fields of trade, investment, economy, legislation, culture, immigration and the prevention of illicit trade. Azerbaijan received assistance from the EU for economic reforms in the country through the TACIS and TRACECA programmes. The “Restoration of the Historic Silk Road” international conference was organized in Baku on 8 September 1998 by Aliyev and President Eduard Shevardnadze of Georgia with the support of the TACIS and TRACECA programmes.

==== Relations with the Council of Europe ====
Azerbaijan participated as a specially invited guest at the Council of Europe (CoE) on 28 June 1996. Consequently, a number of resolutions and legal acts were adopted from 1996 to 2001 to improve the Azerbaijani legislative system so it could fulfill the requirements of European standards and international law. On 28 June 2000, Azerbaijan's full admission to the CoE was recommended at the session of Parliamentary Assembly of the CoE. Azerbaijan became a full member of the CoE on 17 January 2001; the official ceremony was conducted on 25 January 2001. Presidential orders “On the implementation of the measures of the program of cooperation between the Council of Europe and the Republic of Azerbaijan” (8 July 1996), "On the measures of Deepening Cooperation between the Council of Europe and the Republic of Azerbaijan" (20 January 1998), and “On the measures of expanding cooperation between Azerbaijan and CoE for defending interests of the Republic of Azerbaijan in Council of Europe" (14 May 1999) were adopted by Aliyev.

==== Relations with Russia ====
Aliyev prioritized establishing warmer relations with Russia more than the previous leadership of Azerbaijan did. He stated in his speech at Milli Majlis on 15 June 1993, after being elected as the head of the Parliament of Azerbaijan: "Russia, our northern neighbor, is absolutely a vast state. Undoubtedly, the relation based on independent principles between Azerbaijan and Russia must be better, broader and more fruitful." The Agreement on Friendship, Cooperation and Mutual Security between Russia and Azerbaijan was signed on 3 July 1997. Aliyev paid his first official trip to Russia as a president of the Republic of Azerbaijan in July 1997 with the invitation of Russian president Boris Yeltsin. Relations with Russia further developed through Aliyev-Putin negotiations during their bilateral visits (Vladimir Putin visited Azerbaijan in 2001 and Aliyev paid a reciprocal visit to Russia in 2002). The agreements on "The Status and Benefiting Principles of Gabala Radio Location Station", "Long-term economic cooperation agreement between Russian Federation and the Azerbaijan Republic until the year 2010", and "The common declaration of the President of the Russian Federation, Vladimir Putin and President of the Republic of Azerbaijan, Heydar Aliyev" were signed in the latter meeting.

==== Relations with the US ====
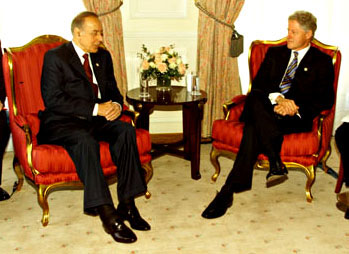
Aliyev with US president Bill Clinton in November 1999

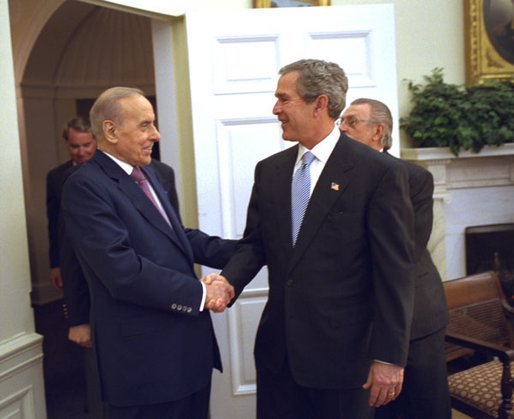
Aliyev with US president George W. Bush in February 2003

Establishing closer relations and developing cooperation with the US were among the main goals of Aliyev's foreign policy. He stated in one of his speeches regarding this issue: “The relations of Azerbaijan with the United States are important as we need to learn the Western democracy, culture, achievements, to benefit from them, to use and apply them in Azerbaijan. In this regard, the United States is a special country for us." Relations between the two countries strengthened after oil contracts were signed. Aliyev paid his first official visit to the US and met with President Bill Clinton on 1 August 1997. They signed a Joint Statement on future relations between the US and Azerbaijan in defense and military issues. During this trip (27 July-5 August 1997), a statement on intentions of formation of bilateral dialogue between the US and Azerbaijan regarding energy issues and the general agreement between the Government of the Azerbaijani Republic, the National Bank, and the US Export-Import Bank on the promotion of projects were signed. Additionally, 4 agreements on development and production sharing for the Azerbaijani sector of the Caspian Sea were signed. After the visit, Aliyev issued an order on “Measures to expand partnership relations between the Republic of Azerbaijan and the United States” on 2 September 1997. Azerbaijan joined a US-lead international coalition against terrorism after 11 September attacks, and sent a military contingent to Afghanistan. An amendment to the Freedom Support Act was adopted on 24 October 2002 by the US Senate to allow a US president to temporarily waive Section 907, which used to forbid to export any financial or humanitarian support to Azerbaijan.

=== Oil strategy ===
Oil pipeline routes

Aliyev used the oil potential of Azerbaijan to avoid the difficulties his country faced after the collapse of the Soviet Union by attracting foreign investment into Azerbaijan. After a year-long series of negotiations in Baku, Istanbul and Houston, the “Agreement on the Joint Development and Production Sharing for the Azeri and Chirag Fields and the Deep Water Portion of the Gunashli Field in the Azerbaijan Sector of the Caspian Sea” was signed in Baku on 20 September 1994 by the Government of Azerbaijan and a consortium of 11 oil companies from 6 countries (US, UK, Russia, Norway, Turkey, Saudi Arabia) in the presence of Aliyev.

The State Oil Fund of Azerbaijan was established by Presidential Decree in December 1999 to gather the income gained from oil profit with the aim of financing social and economic projects. As a result of the oil strategy developed by Aliyev, Azerbaijani oil was planned to be carried through different routes as Baku–Supsa, Baku–Tbilisi–Ceyhan pipeline (BTC), etc. In order to export Azerbaijani oil to the European market, the presidents of Azerbaijan, Georgia and Turkey agreed to construct the Baku-Tbilisi-Ceyhan pipeline in 1998 in Ankara. The ground-breaking ceremony of BTC took place in September 2002 with the participation of Aliyev, Turkish president Ahmet Necdet Sezer, and Georgian president Edward Shevardnadze.

The decision to export Azerbaijani crude oil to the Port of Novorossiysk was made through a contract signed in Moscow on 18 February 1996. Oil transportation through this route was realized in October 1997. Establishment of the alternative Baku–Supsa route was agreed on 8 March 1996 by Aliyev and Shevardnadze. The Baku–Supsa route began operation in April 1999.

== Illness, succession and death ==
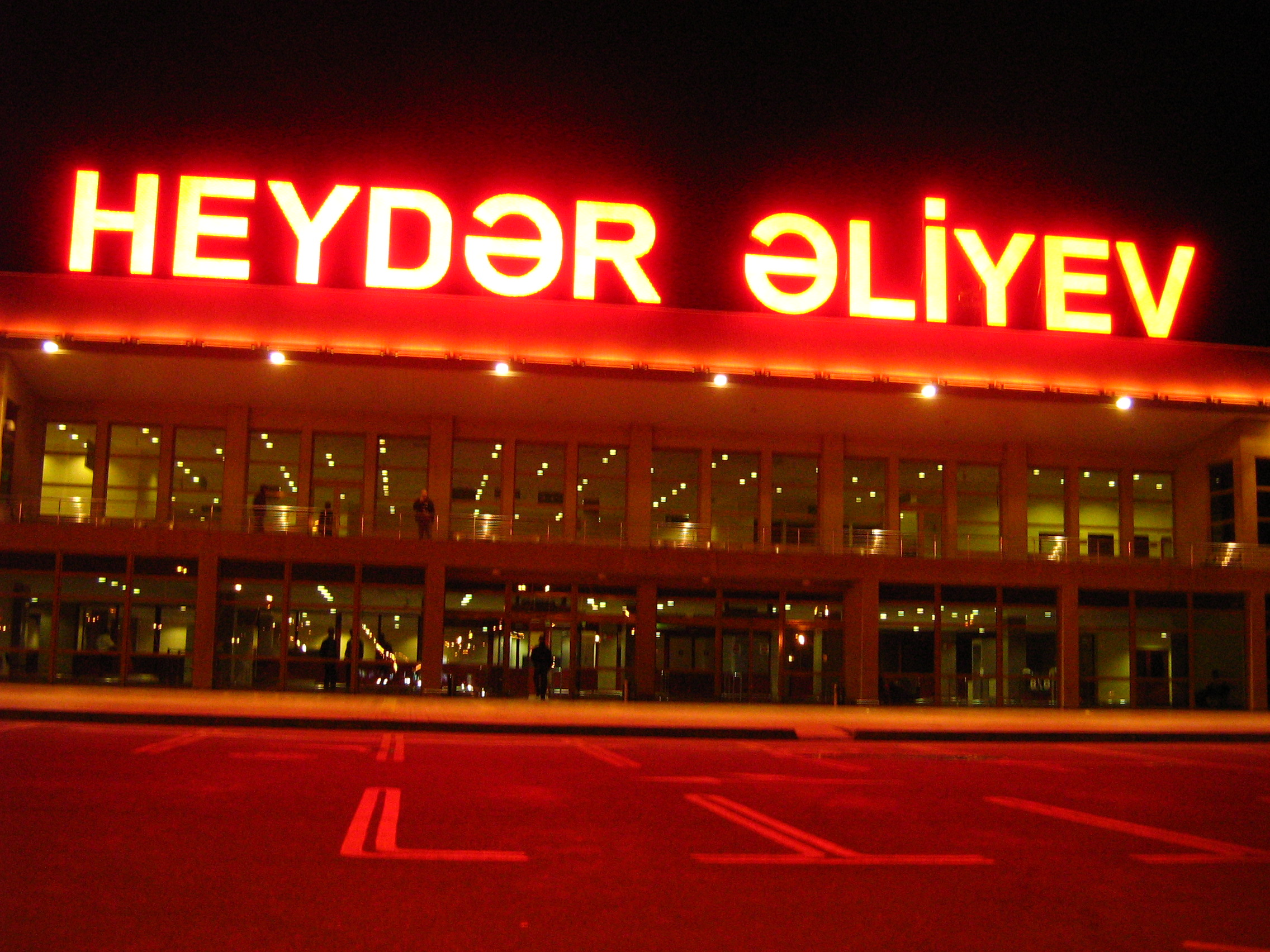
The Heydar Aliyev International Airport in Baku

Aliyev's health began to fail in 1999 when he had a major heart bypass operation in the United States at the Cleveland Clinic. He later had prostate surgery and a hernia operation. He collapsed while giving a speech on live television in April 2003. On 6 August, Aliyev permanently returned to the US for treatment of congestive heart failure and kidney problems.

Less than two weeks before the 2003 Azerbaijani presidential election, he withdrew his candidacy and appointed his son Ilham as his party's presidential candidate. Ilham won the election, which was widely considered to have been fraudulent. International observers criticized the contest as falling well below expected standards.

Aliyev died at the Cleveland Clinic on 12 December 2003, over a month after his term ended. He was given a large state funeral and buried at the Alley of Honor cemetery in Baku.

== Honours ==
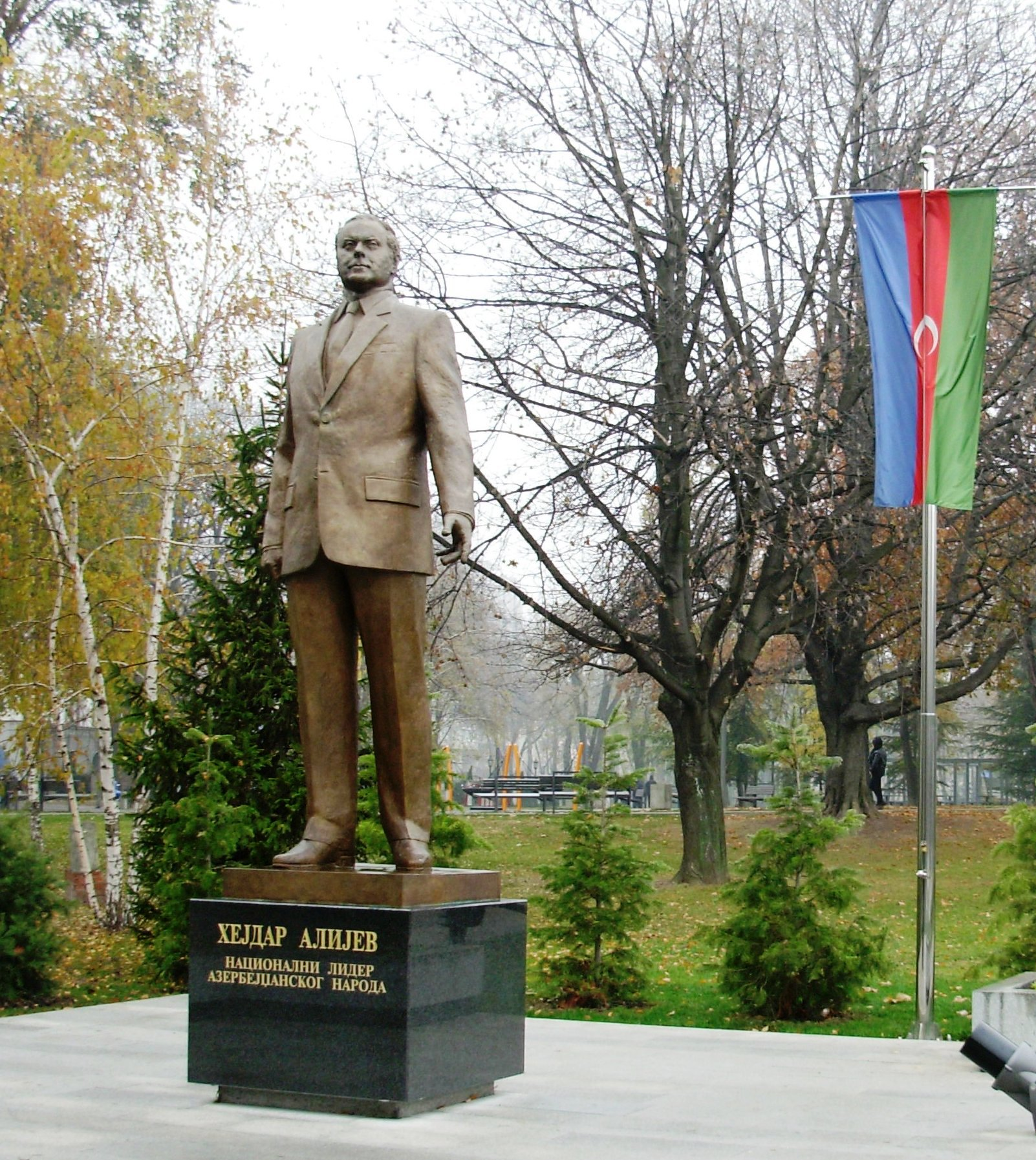
Aliyev's statue in Belgrade

Throughout his life, Aliyev was awarded a number of state orders and medals, international awards, and elected honourable doctor of universities in many countries. Awards he has received include the Order of Lenin five times, the Order of the Red Star once, and Hero of the Socialist Labor twice. On 27 March 1997 in Kyiv, Ukraine, Aliyev received Ukraine's highest award, the Yaroslav Mudry Order, and on 13 April 1999, Turkey's highest honour, the Atatürk International Peace Prize. On 3 April 2003, he was elected a professor and authorized member of the Academy of Safety of the Russian Federation, and was subsequently awarded the Premium of Yuri Andropov. On 10 May 2003, he was decorated with the Order of St. Andrew the Apostle the First-Called—Russia's supreme award. A statue of Aliyev has been unveiled in a Tašmajdan Park in Belgrade; its renovation was aided by 2 million euros ($2.9 million) from the Azerbaijani government. In August 2012 a statue of Aliyev which had been gifted to Mexico by the Azerbaijani embassy was installed in a park in Mexico City but was removed the following January after proving controversial. On 10 April 2023, Heydar Aliyev Street was opened in the center of Astana, the presidents of Kazakhstan and Azerbaijan took part in the opening ceremony.

=== Full list of honours and awards ===
Soviet Union

- Hero of Socialist Labour, twice (1979, 1983)
- Five Orders of Lenin (1971, 1973, 1976, 1979, 1983)
- Order of the October Revolution (1982)
- Order of the Red Star (1962)
- Order of the Patriotic War, 1st class (1985)
- Medal "For Battle Merit"
- Medal "For Labour Valour"
- Medal "For the Defence of the Caucasus" (1944)
- Medal "For the Victory over Germany in the Great Patriotic War 1941–1945" (1945)
- Jubilee Medal "Twenty Years of Victory in the Great Patriotic War 1941–1945" (1965)
- Jubilee Medal "Thirty Years of Victory in the Great Patriotic War 1941–1945" (1975)
- Jubilee Medal "Forty Years of Victory in the Great Patriotic War 1941–1945" (1985)
- Jubilee Medal "In Commemoration of the 100th Anniversary of the Birth of Vladimir Ilyich Lenin" (1969)
- Medal "For Valiant Labour in the Great Patriotic War 1941–1945"
- Medal "Veteran of Labour" (1974)
- Medal "Veteran of the Armed Forces of the USSR" (1976)
- Jubilee Medal "30 Years of the Soviet Army and Navy" (1948)
- Jubilee Medal "40 Years of the Armed Forces of the USSR" (1957)
- Jubilee Medal "50 Years of the Armed Forces of the USSR" (1967)
- Jubilee Medal "60 Years of the Armed Forces of the USSR" (1978)
- Jubilee Medal "70 Years of the Armed Forces of the USSR" (1988)
- Medal "For Impeccable Service" Second Class (1959)
- Medal "For Impeccable Service" First Class (1964)

Other

- Turkey: First Class of the Order of the State of Republic of Turkey (1997)
- Ukraine: Order of Prince Yaroslav the Wise, 1st class (20 March 1997) – "for outstanding contribution to the development of cooperation between Ukraine and the Republic of Azerbaijan and strengthening friendship between the Ukrainian and Azeri people"
- Turkey: Silk Road Service Award by the Silk Road Fund (1998)
- Turkey: Atatürk International Peace Prize (1999)
- Russia: Order of St. Andrew (10 May 2003) – "for his great personal contribution to strengthening friendship and cooperation between Russia and Azerbaijan"
- Russia: Chuvash National Prize named after Ivan Yakovlev (2000)
- Georgia: Order of the Golden Fleece (2001)
- Kazakhstan: Astana Medal
- France: Grand Cross of the Legion of Honour (2003)
- Ukraine: "Gloria Populi" award of Golden Fortune International Scientific Organization
- Order of St. Sergius of Radonezh, 1st class (ROC)
- Order "Sheikh-ul-Islam" (posthumously)

== See also ==
- President of Azerbaijan
- Politics of Azerbaijan
- Supreme Soviet of Azerbaijan
- Foreign relations of Azerbaijan
- List of political parties in Azerbaijan
- List of leaders of Nakhchivan Autonomous Republic
- Supreme Assembly of the Nakhchivan Autonomous Republic

== Notes ==
Party political offices
Preceded by Vali Akhundov	First Secretary of the Azerbaijan Communist Party; 1969–1982	Succeeded by Kamran Bagirov
Political offices
Preceded by none	Parliamentary Chairman of Nakhchivan; 1991–1993	Succeeded by Vasif Talibov
Preceded by Abulfaz Elchibey	President of Azerbaijan; 1993–2003	Succeeded by Ilham Aliyev
