= 1993 Azerbaijani vote of confidence referendum =

Azerbaijani vote of confidence referendum
- 29 August 1993
- Do you trust the President of the Azerbaijan Republic A. Elchibey?

Results
Choice	Votes	%
Yes	77,730	2.07%
No	3,673,978	97.93%
Valid votes	3,751,708	99.57%
Invalid or blank votes	16,220	0.43%
Total votes	3,767,928	100.00%
Registered voters/turnout	4,097,367	91.96%

A national vote of confidence in President Abulfaz Elchibey was held in Azerbaijan on 29 August 1993, following a coup d'état in June by Surat Huseynov. Voters were asked if they trusted the President of the Azerbaijan Republic. Only 2% of voters voted "yes", with turnout reported to be 92%. Elchibey was formally removed from office on 1 September.

== Results ==
Do you trust the President of the Azerbaijan Republic?
Choice	Votes	%
Yes	77,730	2.07
No	3,673,978	97.93
Total	3,751,708	100.00
Valid votes	3,751,708	99.57
Invalid/blank votes	16,220	0.43
Total votes	3,767,928	100.00
Registered voters/turnout	4,097,367	91.96
Source: Nohlen et al.
