= Ali Ahmadov =

Azerbaijani professor and politician

- Əli Əhmədov
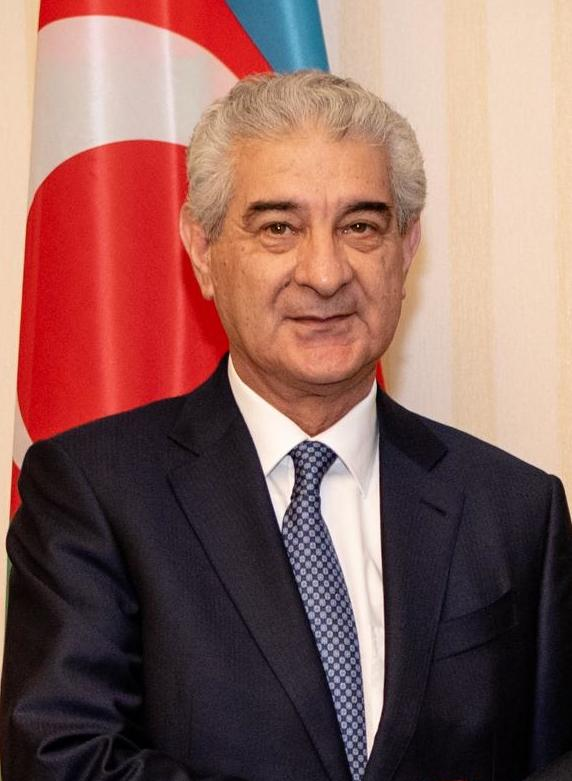
- Ahmadov in 2019

First Deputy Chairman of the National Assembly
- Incumbent
- Assumed office September 23, 2024
- Chairman: Sahiba Gafarova

Deputy Prime Minister of Azerbaijan
- In office 22 October 2013 – September 23, 2024
- President: Ilham Aliyev
- Prime Minister: Artur Rasizade; Novruz Mammadov; Ali Asadov

Deputy Chairman of the New Azerbaijan Party
- Incumbent
- Assumed office 2005

Executive Secretary of the New Azerbaijan Party
- In office 1999 – March 5, 2021

Personal details
- Born: 27 January 1953 (age 73) Dara, Basargechar, Armenian SSR, USSR
- Citizenship: USSR; Azerbaijan
- Party: New Azerbaijan Party
- Education: Moscow State Historical-Archival Institute
- Awards

Ali Cavad oghlu Ahmadov (Azerbaijani: Əli Cavad oğlu Əhmədov, born 27 January 1953) is an Azerbaijani politician and the current First Deputy Chairman of the National Assembly. He was also Deputy Prime Minister of the Republic of Azerbaijan from 2013-2024.

== Biography ==
Ali Ahmadov was born on January 27, 1953, in Dara, Armenia SSR. He graduated from the Faculty of History of Moscow State Historical-Archival Institute. From 1975, he was a senior researcher at Main Archives Department, head of Central Scientific General Archive of Azerbaijan National Academy of Sciences. Since 1980, he has worked as a laboratory assistant, teacher, senior teacher, associate professor, head of the department at Azerbaijan State University.

== Political career ==
From 1997, Ali Ahmadov worked as a Deputy Head of Department in Presidential Administration of Azerbaijan. In 1999–2000, he was the Head of Khatai Raion Executive. In 1999, at the first congress of the New Azerbaijan Party, he was elected Executive Secretary of the party. He was elected Deputy Chairman and Executive Secretary of the New Azerbaijan Party at the III Congress of the Party in 2005, the V Congress in 2013 and the VI Congress in 2018. In 2000, he was a deputy of 2nd convocation of Milli Majlis.

On November 6, 2005, he was elected a deputy from Narimanov First Constituency. He was a member of Standing Committee on Science and Education of Milli Majlis. In 2010, A. Ahmadov was elected a deputy of 4th convocation of Milli Majlis. Head of Azerbaijan-China working group on interparliamentary relations, member of Azerbaijan-Belarus, Azerbaijan-Italy working groups on interparliamentary relations.

On October 22, 2013, he became the Deputy Prime Minister of the Republic of Azerbaijan.

He was elected as a deputy of the Milli Majlis of the 7th convocation after winning the snap parliamentary elections held on September 1, 2024. He was elected as the First Deputy Speaker of the Milli Majlis at the first session of the new parliament. On September 23, 2024, he was dismissed from the post of Deputy Prime Minister of the Republic by the decree of the President.

In October 2024, he was appointed co-chairman of the Azerbaijani side of the Commission for Interparliamentary Cooperation between the Milli Majlis of the Republic of Azerbaijan and the Federal Assembly of the Russian Federation. He replaced Ali Huseynli in this position.

== Awards ==
- Knight's Cross of the Order of Merit of the Republic of Poland — 2009
- Shohrat Order — 21 January 2013
