= 8th Government of Azerbaijan =

The 8th Government of Azerbaijan is the current formation of the Cabinet of Azerbaijan.

== Prime minister ==
- Novruz Mammadov (2018 to 2019)
- Ali Asadov (from 2019)

== Deputy Prime Ministers ==
- Yaqub Eyyubov
- Shahin Mustafayev
- Ali Ahmadov
- Hajibala Abutalybov
- Ali S. Hasanov

== Other ministers ==
- Vilayat Eyvazov - Minister of Internal Affairs
- Mukhtar Babayev - Minister of Ecology and Natural Resources
- Parviz Shahbazov - Minister of Energy
- Fikrat Mammadov - Minister of Justice
- Sahil Babayev - Minister of Labour and Social Protection of Population
- Kamaladdin Heydarov - Minister of Emergency Situations
- Farid Gayibov - Minister of Youth and Sports
- Mikayil Jabbarov - Minister of Economу
- Inam Karimov - Minister of Agriculture
- Samir Sharifov - Minister of Finance
- Anar Karimov - Minister of Culture
- Zakir Hasanov - Minister of Defence
- Madat Guliyev - Minister of Defence Industry
- Rashad Nabiyev - Minister of Transport, Communications and High Technologies
- Teymur Musayev - Minister of Healthcare
- Emin Amrullayev - Minister of Education
- Jeyhun Bayramov - Minister of Foreign Affairs

== See also ==
- Politics of Azerbaijan
