= Qaraqaşlı, Sabirabad =

Garagashly
- Municipality
- Azerbaijani: Qaraqaşlı
- Location within Azerbaijan
- Coordinates: 40°05′36″N 48°39′44″E
- Country: Azerbaijan
- District: Sabirabad

Population
  - Total: 1,406
- Time zone: UTC+4 (AZT)
  - Summer (DST): UTC+5 (AZT)

Qaraqaşlı (also, Garagashly) is a village and municipality in the Sabirabad District of Azerbaijan. It has a population of 1,406.

== Notable natives ==
- Panah Huseyn — Prime Minister of Azerbaijan (1993).
