= First Deputy Prime Minister of Azerbaijan =

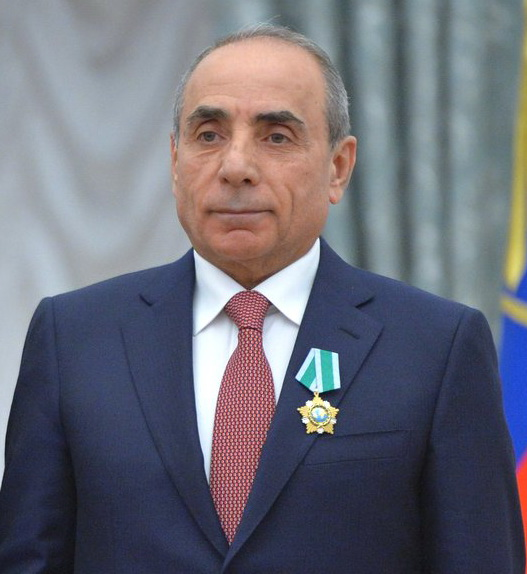
Incumbent First Deputy Prime Minister Yagub Eyyubov

The First Deputy Prime Minister of the Republic of Azerbaijan (Azerbaijani: Azərbaycan Respublikası Baş nazirinin birinci müavini) is a government post of the Cabinet of Ministers of Azerbaijan. In the absence of the Prime Minister of Azerbaijan, the first deputy performs his or her duties as the acting prime minister. In 1991, the post was grandfathered from the already existing first deputy chairman that was part of the Council of Ministers of the Azerbaijan Soviet Socialist Republic. In an absence of the first deputy, his or her functions are performed by multiple other deputy prime ministers who are members of the government. The current First Deputy Prime Minister is Yagub Eyyubov, serving since 13 February 2003.

== List ==
Name	Start date	Expiration date	President
Firuz Mustafayev	May 22, 1991	May 18, 1992	Ayaz Mutallibov
Artur Rasizade	May 22, 1991	May 16, 1992	Ayaz Mutallibov Abulfaz Elchibey Heydar Aliyev
Artur Rasizade	May 3, 1996	November 26, 1996	Ayaz Mutallibov Abulfaz Elchibey Heydar Aliyev
Artur Rasizade	August 4, 2003	October 31, 2003	Ayaz Mutallibov Abulfaz Elchibey Heydar Aliyev
Rahim Huseynov	May 4, 1992	May 16, 1992	Ayaz Mutallibov
Vahid Ahmadov	May 16, 1992	January 6, 1994	Ayaz Mutallibov Abulfaz Elchibey Heydar Aliyev
Ziyad Samadzadeh	May 18, 1992	November 19, 1992	Ayaz Mutallibov Abulfaz Elchibey
Abbas Abbasov	May 18, 1992	April 28, 1993	Abulfaz Elchibey
Abbas Abbasov	September 16, 1994	May 19, 2006	Heydar Aliyev Ilham Aliyev
Ali Masimli	November 19, 1992	September 2, 1993	Abulfaz Elchibey Heydar Aliyev
Fuad Guliyev	March 5, 1994	May 2, 1995	Heydar Aliyev
Yagub Eyyubov	13 February 2003	Present	Heydar Aliyev Ilham Aliyev

== See also ==
- First Deputy Prime Minister of Russia
- First Deputy Prime Minister of Belarus
- Deputy Prime Minister of Georgia
- First Deputy Prime Minister of Armenia
- Deputy Prime Minister of Turkey
