= Randall Baker =

American environmental historian

Randall Baker was a former Director of the School of Public and Environmental Affairs at Indiana University, Bloomington. He was born in Wales in 1944 and died in 2020. He was awarded an honorary degree from Moscow State University, University of Sofia and Baku State University and also Honorary Professor at Western University (Azerbaijan) and New Bulgarian University where he helped establish a public affairs curriculum.
