= Politics of Azerbaijan =

Politics of Azerbaijan Azərbaycan siyasəti
- Emblem of Azerbaijan
- Polity type: Unitary semi-presidential republic
- Constitution: Constitution of Azerbaijan

Legislative branch
- Name: National Assembly
- Type: Unicameral
- Presiding officer: Sahiba Gafarova, Speaker of the National Assembly

Executive branch
- Head of state
- Title: President of Azerbaijan
- Currently: Ilham Aliyev
- Appointer: Direct popular vote (two rounds if necessary)
- Head of government
- Title: Prime Minister of Azerbaijan
- Currently: Ali Asadov
- Appointer: President of Azerbaijan
- Cabinet
- Name: Cabinet of Azerbaijan
- Current cabinet: 8th Government of Azerbaijan
- Leader: Prime Minister of Azerbaijan
- Appointer: President of Azerbaijan
- Ministries: 19

Judicial branch
- Name: Judiciary of Azerbaijan
- Constitutional Court of Azerbaijan
- Chief judge: Farhad Abdullayev
- Supreme Court of Azerbaijan
- Chief judge: Inam Karimov

The politics of Azerbaijan take place within an authoritarian system characterized by limited political pluralism and restrictions on civil liberties. According to international organizations such as Freedom House, Amnesty International, and Human Rights Watch, elections in Azerbaijan are not considered free or fair, political opposition faces repression, and human rights abuses are widespread. Power is largely concentrated in the hands of President Ilham Aliyev and members of his extended family.

Azerbaijan is nominally a semi-presidential republic, with the President of Azerbaijan as the head of state, and the Prime Minister of Azerbaijan as head of government. Executive power is exercised by the president and the government. Checks and balances are nominally ensured by the legislature (Azerbaijan's National Assembly) and the Judiciary but both institutions are in practice firmly controlled by the executive.

The politics of Azerbaijan have since 1969 been dominated by the Aliyev family. Heydar Aliyev governed Soviet Azerbaijan from 1969 to 1982 as First Secretary of the Communist Party of Azerbaijan, and as President of Azerbaijan from 1993 to 2003 after seizing power in the aftermath of a 1993 military coup. Ilham Aliyev, Heydar's son, was installed as president in 2003.

== Political history ==
V-Dem Democracy Indices for electoral democracy (solid) and liberal democracy (dotted) in Azerbaijan

Azerbaijan declared its independence from the former Soviet Union on 30 August 1991, with Ayaz Mutalibov, former First Secretary of the Azerbaijani Communist Party, becoming the country's first President. Following a massacre of Azerbaijanis at Khojali in Nagorno-Karabakh in March 1992, Mutalibov resigned and the country experienced a period of political fragility. The old guard returned Mutalibov to power in May 1992, but less than a week later his efforts to suspend scheduled presidential elections and ban all political activity prompted the opposition Azerbaijan Popular Front Party (PFP) to organize a resistance movement and take power. Among its reforms, the PFP dissolved the predominantly Communist Supreme Soviet and transferred its functions to the 50-member upper house of the legislature, the National Council.

Elections in June 1992 resulted in the selection of PFP leader Abulfaz Elchibey as the country's second president. The national presidential elections with 7 candidates were held on 7 June 1992 in which Elchibey was elected the President of Azerbaijan, gaining 54% of votes and becoming Azerbaijan's first democratically elected, non-communist president. During the summer of 1992, Elchibey secured the full withdrawal of the Soviet army from Azerbaijan, which became the first and only former Soviet republic (after the Baltic states) free of Soviet military presence. At the same time, Elchibey's government established the national Caspian Navy and managed to reach an agreement with Russia on receiving one-quarter of the Soviet Caspian Navy based in Baku.

The National Council conferred presidential powers upon its new speaker, Heydar Aliyev, former First Secretary of the Azerbaijani Communist Party (1969–81) and later a member of the Soviet Union's Politburo, the KGB, and USSR Deputy Prime Minister (until 1987). Elchibey was formally deposed by a national referendum in August 1993, and Aliyev was elected to a 5-year term as President in October with only token opposition. Aliyev won re-election to another 5-year term in 1998. According to conclusions of OSCE ODIHR election observation report "clear political will was demonstrated by the authorities of the Republic of Azerbaijan to significantly improve on the election practice of the country. The efforts in this direction were initiated in the late spring of 1998 by a review of the election legislation to put it in line with OSCE commitments, by the formal abolishment of censorship in August 1998 and by the final approval of the new Citizenship Law in late September 1998. In this way the authorities responded positively to concerns raised by the international community and indicated their willingness to meet international standards in the conduct of the election process".

The Speaker of Parliament stood next in line to the President, but the constitution was changed at the end of 2002: now the premier is next in line. In August 2003, İlham Aliyev was appointed as premier. In the October 2003 presidential elections, İlham Aliyev was the winner and was sworn in as president at the end of the same month, and Rasizade was appointed premier again.

President Ilham Aliyev and his New Azerbaijan Party keep an iron grip on power through fraudulent votes; international observers have never deemed an election in the country to be free and fair. In April 2018, President Ilham Aliyev secured his fourth consecutive term in the election that was boycotted by the main opposition parties as fraudulent.

According to a 2025 survey the main issues in Azerbaijan were unemployment, low salaries and poverty.

== Executive branch ==
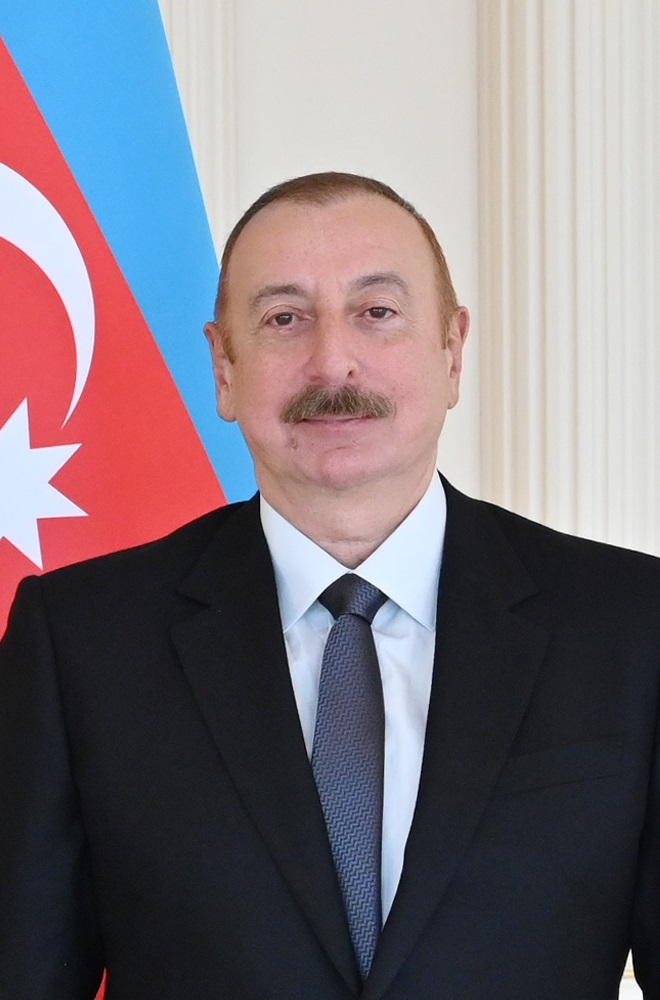
Ilham Aliyev, President of Azerbaijan

Main office-holders
Office	Name	Party	Since
President	İlham Aliyev	New Azerbaijan Party (YAP)	15 October 2003
Vice President	Mehriban Aliyeva	New Azerbaijan Party (YAP)	21 February 2017
Prime Minister	Ali Asadov	Independent	8 October 2019

President is the head of the state and chief of the executive branch. The people elect the president; the Vice President is appointed by the President and the Prime Minister is nominated by the President and confirmed by the National Assembly of Azerbaijan. Presidential term is seven years. The President appoints all cabinet-level government officials (ministers, heads of other central executive bodies) and heads of local executive bodies.

Since 2008, the Constitution of Azerbaijan was amended, abolishing any term limit for the office of President. Last Constitutional reform took place in September 2016 and introduced the office of Vice President.

=== President ===
According to the Constitution of the Republic of Azerbaijan, the President of the Republic of Azerbaijan is the head of state and possesses executive power. The President of the Republic of Azerbaijan represents the country in internal and external affairs. The President of the Republic of Azerbaijan ensures the independence and territorial integrity of Azerbaijan, and guarantees compliance with international treaties.

The President in Azerbaijan is directly elected for a 7-year term, with the candidate required to have the right to vote, residing in Azerbaijani territory for more than 10 years, possess a higher education, lack citizenship or liabilities to the foreign states, and not convicted for a serious crime.

The President could be removed by the National Assembly following conviction by the Supreme Court, if the decision is adopted by three-quarters majority of the deputies. Otherwise, the President enjoys personal immunity.

The Constitution endows the President with the following powers:

- appointment and dismissal of vice-presidents
- designation of elections to the National Assembly of the Republic of Azerbaijan
- Proposal of the annual budget and military doctrine to the National Assembly
- approval of economic and social policies
- appointment and dismissal of the Prime Minister of the Republic of Azerbaijan with the consent of the National Assembly.
- Nomination of the judges of the Constitutional Court, Supreme Court, Appellate Courts, and other courts, with approval from the National Assembly.
- assignment and dismissal of the Prosecutor General of the Republic of Azerbaijan (with the consent of the Milli Mejlis)
- creation of local and central executive bodies
- appointment and dissolution of the Cabinet of Ministers of the Republic of Azerbaijan
- appointment and dismissal of members of the Cabinet of Ministers of the Republic of Azerbaijan
- revocation of the decision of the Cabinet of Ministers
- appointment and dismissal of the command staff of the Armed Forces of the Republic of Azerbaijan
- formation of the Administration of the President of the Republic of Azerbaijan
- appointment of the head of the Administration of the President of the Republic of Azerbaijan
- Formation of the Security Council of the Republic of Azerbaijan
- call for referendum
- call of early elections
- pardon of prisoners
- bestowment of state decorations and honorary titles
- promulgation and publication of laws
- declaration of a state of emergency or martial law
- the declaration of war and the conclusion of peace (with the consent of the Milli Majlis)

=== Vice Presidents ===
The Vice-Presidents of Azerbaijan are high-ranking officials subordinate to the President. First Vice-President and Vice-Presidents are appointed and dismissed by the President. In case of an early resignation of the president, within 60 days, as long as the new elections are called, the president's powers are fulfilled by the First Vice-President of Azerbaijan. The First Vice-President of Azerbaijan enjoys inviolability; can not be detained or brought to criminal responsibility, except in cases of detention at the scene of a crime, can not be searched or personally searched.

Any citizen with a higher education who has the right to vote and has no obligations to other states can become a vice-president of Azerbaijan. Vice-presidents have the right to immunity.

== Legislative branch ==
The National Assembly of Azerbaijan (Azerbaijani: Milli Məclis) is the legislative branch of government in Azerbaijan. The unicameral National Assembly consists of 125 deputies elected in single-member constituencies.

Officially voting is free, individual and secret. Candidates may be self-nominated or nominated by political parties, their blocs or groups of voters. All citizens over 18 years of age have the right to vote, except those recognised as incapable by a court. Every citizen of at least 25 years of age may be elected with certain exceptions (i.e. dual citizenship, liabilities towards a foreign state, holding a position in the executive or judicial branches of power, remunerated activities - with certain exceptions, such as members of religious professions, incapacity confirmed by court, conviction for a serious crime or serving a sentence). The validity of election results is confirmed in respect of each candidate by the Constitutional Court, and the National Assembly is constituted upon confirmation in office of 83 deputies.

Every year, the National Assembly of the Republic of Azerbaijan holds two regular, spring and autumn, sessions. Extraordinary sessions are convened by its Speaker at the request of the President of the Republic of Azerbaijan or 42 deputies of the National Assembly. The meetings of the sessions of the National Assembly of the Republic of Azerbaijan are open to the public. A meeting of the session of the Milli Majlis may be closed to the public on the proposal of 83 members of parliament or the proposal of the President of the Republic of Azerbaijan. The assembly is headed by the Speaker of Milli Majlis assisted by the First Deputy Speaker and two deputy speakers. Ogtay Asadov is the current speaker of the assembly, Ziyafet Asgarov is the First Deputy Speaker and, Bahar Muradova and Valeh Alasgarov are deputy speakers. Currently (for the term of 2015-2010) 21 women and 104 men deputies are elected in National Assembly. The National Assembly is divided into 15 Committees according to the areas they are focused. Its structure also includes Chamber of Accounts, Toponymic Commission, Disciplinary Commission and Azerbaijan newspaper.

A legislative initiative can be taken by an MP, the President of the Republic, the Supreme Court, the Prosecutor's Office, the NAR Supreme Council and a group of 40 thousand citizens who are eligible to vote. The Nakhchivan Autonomous Republic is a constituent part of Azerbaijan with its own elected parliament (the Supreme Council) consisting of 45 deputies. Elections to the Supreme Council are regulated by the Nakhchivan Constitution.

== Political parties and elections ==
Azerbaijan is considered a one party dominant state. Opposition parties against the New Azerbaijan Party are repressed and none of the post-1992 elections have been free and fair. Opposition parties are repressed. They have frequently been blocked from running in elections or they have boycotted elections due to the undemocratic conduct of the elections.

The ruling New Azerbaijan Party, headed by Ilham Aliyev, controls all the electoral commissions in Azerbaijan.

=== Presidential elections ===
Candidate	Party	Votes	%
Ilham Aliyev	New Azerbaijan Party	3,394,898	86.02
Zahid Oruj	Independent	122,956	3.12
Sardar Jalaloglu	Azerbaijan Democratic Party	119,621	3.03
Gudrat Hasanguliyev	Whole Azerbaijan Popular Front Party	119,311	3.02
Hafiz Hajiyev	Modern Equality Party	59,924	1.52
Araz Alizadeh	Azerbaijani Social Democratic Party	54,533	1.38
Faraj Guliyev	National Revival Movement Party	45,967	1.16
Razi Nurullayev	Independent	29,229	0.74
Total		3,946,439	100.00
Valid votes		3,946,439	99.69
Invalid/blank votes		12,413	0.31
Total votes		3,958,852	100.00
Registered voters/turnout		5,332,817	74.24
Source: CEC

=== Parliamentary elections ===
Party	Votes	%	Seats	+/–
New Azerbaijan Party	976,163	41.84	70	+1
Musavat	38,714	1.66	0	0
Civic Solidarity Party	27,121	1.16	3	+1
Whole Azerbaijan Popular Front Party	16,189	0.69	1	0
Great Order Party	15,846	0.68	1	0
Motherland Party	12,587	0.54	1	0
Civic Unity Party	11,983	0.51	1	0
Unity Party	11,347	0.49	1	0
Azerbaijan Democratic Enlightenment Party	9,004	0.39	1	0
Azerbaijan Hope Party	7,565	0.32	0	0
Modern Musavat Party	6,844	0.29	0	New
Azerbaijan National Independence Party	6,688	0.29	0	0
United Azerbaijan Party	6,358	0.27	0	New
Azerbaijan Democrat Party	6,110	0.26	0	0
Democratic Reforms Party	5,533	0.24	1	0
National Revival Movement Party	4,980	0.21	0	–1
Azerbaijan Free Republican Party	2,637	0.11	0	New
Azerbaijan People's Party	2,330	0.10	0	0
Azerbaijan Social Prosperity Party	1,508	0.06	0	–1
Democratic Azerbaijani World Party	1,202	0.05	0	0
National Unity Party	1,163	0.05	0	New
Intellectuals Party	1,029	0.04	0	New
Azerbaijan Communist Party	957	0.04	0	0
Great Azerbaijan Party	834	0.04	0	0
Citizen and Development Party	798	0.03	0	0
Justice Party	766	0.03	0	0
Azerbaijan Liberal Democratic Party	638	0.03	0	New
Azerbaijan Fighters Party	74	0.00	0	New
Independents	1,155,884	49.55	41	–2
Invalidated			4	–
Total	2,332,852	100.00	125	0
Valid votes	2,332,852	92.94		
Invalid/blank votes	177,283	7.06		
Total votes	2,510,135	100.00		
Registered voters/turnout	5,359,015	46.84		
Source: MSK, IPU

== Cabinet of Ministers ==
The Cabinet of Ministers is the chief executive body under the authority of the President. The Prime Minister. Deputy Prime Ministers, Ministers, and Heads of other central executive organs are appointed and dismissed by the President. The Cabinet dissolves on the start of term by the newly elected President, who instead appoints a new Cabinet.

The powers of the Cabinet include drafting the state budget and presenting it to the president, executing the budget, implementing state economic and social programs, securing financial and credit and monetary policy, managing ministries and other executive bodies of the Republic of Azerbaijan.

The 8th Government of Azerbaijan is the cabinet in its current formation.

== Judicial branch ==
Although the Azerbaijan constitution nominally guarantees judicial independence, the executive firmly controls judges and prosecutors. Judges and prosecutors collaborate in Azerbaijan to repress political opponents.

Judicial power is administered by the Constitutional Court, the Supreme Court, the courts of appeal, ordinary and specialised courts. The judicial system and legal proceedings are determined by law, and the establishment of extraordinary courts is prohibited. The Supreme Court of Azerbaijan is a supreme judicial body on civil, criminal and other cases related to the execution of general and specialized courts. The Constitutional Court of Azerbaijan is the supreme body of constitutional justice on the matters attributed to its jurisdiction by the Constitution, with authority to interpret and apply the Constitution of Azerbaijan. The Constitutional Court consists of nine judges appointed for a non-renewable 15-year term. Judges of Constitutional Court of the Republic of Azerbaijan are appointed by Milli Majlis (National Assembly) of the Republic of Azerbaijan on recommendation by the President of the Republic of Azerbaijan. Any person may appeal before it for the restoration of their infringed rights and freedoms. The 2003 Law on the Constitutional Court defines the Court's activities, as well as the status and duties of its judges. The Court's decisions are published and their execution is mandatory.

The court system comprises three levels. The first level includes 86 district/city courts, 5 serious crime courts, 6 military courts and 7 economic courts. Cases are heard by a single judge or a panel of judges. The second level consists of 6 courts of appeal (“higher courts”), and the third level - the Supreme Court - is the highest judicial body for civil, criminal, economic and military matters. It reviews the decisions of appeal courts and clarifies judicial practice. The courts in the Nakhchivan Autonomous Republic are part of the court system. The Nakhchivan Autonomous Republic Supreme Court serves as the appeal instance and its rulings are considered in cassation by the Supreme Court of Azerbaijan.

According to the Constitution of the Azerbaijan Republic, the Prosecutor's Office is defined as a part of the Judicial branch. Prosecutors Office exercises control over fulfilment and application of laws within the legal framework; in cases envisaged by law it undertakes prosecution and carries out investigation; supports state accusation in the court of law; proposes actions in the court of law; and appeals against decisions of the court of law.

== Nakhchivan Autonomous Republic ==
The Nakhchivan Autonomous Republic is autonomous state within the Republic of Azerbaijan.

== Municipalities ==
Local self-government in Azerbaijan is exercised by municipalities. Elections to municipalities and the status of municipalities are determined by the National Assembly of the Republic of Azerbaijan. Within the framework of the sovereignty of the Republic of Azerbaijan, municipalities are independent in exercising their powers. The state controls the implementation of the activities of municipalities. The municipalities submit the activity report to the National Assembly of the Republic of Azerbaijan. Municipalities are responsible to the citizens of the Republic of Azerbaijan.

Every citizen of the Republic of Azerbaijan, who has the right to participate in elections and who permanently resides in the respective constituencies, may be elected as a member of the municipality. Elections to the municipality are held every 5 years.

Municipalities organize their work through meetings that are convened by the chairman of municipalities. The chairman is elected at the meetings of the municipality. In addition, the rules of the local government, the powers of its members, the local budget and its implementation, taxes and fees are approved at meetings, local programs of social security, social and economic development, and economic programs are adopted. In the municipalities of the Republic of Azerbaijan, decisions are taken by a majority of the members of the municipality.

== Foreign relations ==
Azerbaijan is a member of the United Nations, the Organization for Security and Cooperation in Europe, NATO's Partnership for Peace, Euro-Atlantic Partnership, World Health Organization, the European Bank for Reconstruction and Development, the Council of Europe, CFE Treaty, the Community of Democracies, the International Monetary Fund, and the World Bank.

Turkey (the first country to recognize Azerbaijan's independence) has been a staunch supporter of Azerbaijan in its efforts to consolidate its independence, preserve its territorial integrity and realize its economic potential arising from the rich natural resources of the Caspian Sea. The Turkish cultural close ties with Azerbaijan is summarized by the slogan "One nation, two countries".

Armenia supports ethnic Armenians in the Nagorno-Karabakh region of Azerbaijan in the longstanding and very bitter separatist conflict against the Azerbaijani Government; the two countries are still at war, a cease-fire has been in place since 1994 but the fire has been renewed on 27 September 2020. (See Nagorno-Karabakh conflict and Second Nagorno-Karabakh War).

Azerbaijan is one of the few countries with predominantly Muslim populations that shares a strategic alliance with Israel. Today, Israel is a major arms supplier to the country. (See Azerbaijan–Israel relations).

Azerbaijan also maintains good relations with the European Union, in the framework of its Eastern European Neighbourhood Policy (See Azerbaijan–European Union relations).

Azerbaijan was elected as one of the members of the newly established Human Rights Council (HRC) by the General Assembly on May 9, 2006. Term of office began on June 19, 2006.

== Military ==
The Azerbaijan Armed Forces consists of four military branches: the army, navy, air force, and air defense forces. The national armed forces of Azerbaijan were formed by presidential decree in October 1991.

In July 1992, Azerbaijan ratified the Treaty on Conventional Armed Forces in Europe (CFE), which establishes comprehensive limits on key categories of conventional military equipment and provides for the destruction of weaponry in excess of those limits.

== See also ==
- Heydar Aliyev's cult of personality
- Judiciary of Azerbaijan
- Media freedom in Azerbaijan

== Sources ==
- Baas, Reyer (March 3, 2003). "Een lange weg voor Azerbeidzjan". The Alfred Mozer Foundation.
- CIA World Factbook 2000 and the 2003 U.S. Department of State website
- Forrest, Brett (November 28, 2005). "Over A Barrel in Baku". Fortune, pp. 54–60.
