= Yagub Mammadov (politician) =

Azerbaijani politician, professor and scientist (born 1941)

- Yaqub Məmmədov
- Mammadov in 2013

Acting President of Azerbaijan
- In office 6 March 1992 – 14 May 1992
- Prime Minister: Hasan Hasanov; Firuz Mustafayev
- Preceded by: Ayaz Mutallibov
- Succeeded by: Ayaz Mutallibov

Chairman of the Supreme Soviet of Azerbaijan
- In office 5 March 1992 – 18 May 1992
- Preceded by: Elmira Gafarova
- Succeeded by: Isa Gambar

Personal details
- Born: 3 March 1941 (age 85) Aliismailly, Gadabay Rayon, Azerbaijan SSR
- Party: Independent
- Occupation: Professor

Yagub Javad oghlu Mammadov (Azerbaijani: Yaqub Cavad oğlu Məmmədov; born 3 March 1941), commonly known as Yagub (also Jacob in English) Mammadov, was the acting President of Azerbaijan from 6 March to 14 May and from 18 to 19 May 1992. Mammadov is currently an opposition politician, professor, and scientist.

== Early life ==
Mammadov was born on 3 March 1941 in Əliismayıllı village of the Gadabay District. He graduated from the pediatrics faculty of Azerbaijan Medical University. Mammadov is a professor at Azerbaijan Medical University, delivering lectures on pathophysiology since 1966. His scientific research includes a study of fundamental problems of lymphology. Mammadov has 370 scientific publications.

== Political career ==
In the midst of political turmoil in Azerbaijan, Yaqub Mammadov, then the rector of Azerbaijan Medical University, was elected the Chairman of Supreme Soviet of Azerbaijan on 5 March during the extraordinary session of the parliament related to the Khojaly massacre of Azerbaijani civilians in the Nagorno-Karabakh region of Azerbaijan after the speaker of the parliament, Elmira Gafarova resigned from her post. On 6 March, President Ayaz Mutallibov was forced to resign and according to the Azerbaijani constitution of the period, speaker of the parliament, Yagub Mammadov assumed the presidential duties until the new elections. While acting as the President of Azerbaijan, Mammadov met with then Armenian president Levon Ter-Petrosyan in Tehran in an effort to start peace talks mediated by Iran. On 8 May, when the Tehran Communiqué between Ter-Petrosian and Mammadov was signed, Armenian forces captured Shusha. In his interviews, Mammadov always refused to assume any responsibility for the loss of Shusha.

On 14 May, the former President Mutalibov returned to power after the parliament absolved him of the responsibility for the Khojaly Massacre but was ousted by the armed revolt led by Azerbaijan Popular Front on 15 May. Yaqub Mammadov resigned as Speaker of the Parliament on 18 May 1992 and was then replaced by Isa Gambar.

Political offices
Preceded by Ayaz Mutalibov	Acting President of Azerbaijan (interim); 6 March 1992 – 14 May 1992	Succeeded by Ayaz Mutalibov
Preceded by Ayaz Mutalibov	Acting President of Azerbaijan (interim); 18 May 1992 – 19 May 1992	Succeeded by Isa Qambar
