= Isa Gambar =

Azerbaijani politician (born 1957)

- İsa Qəmbər
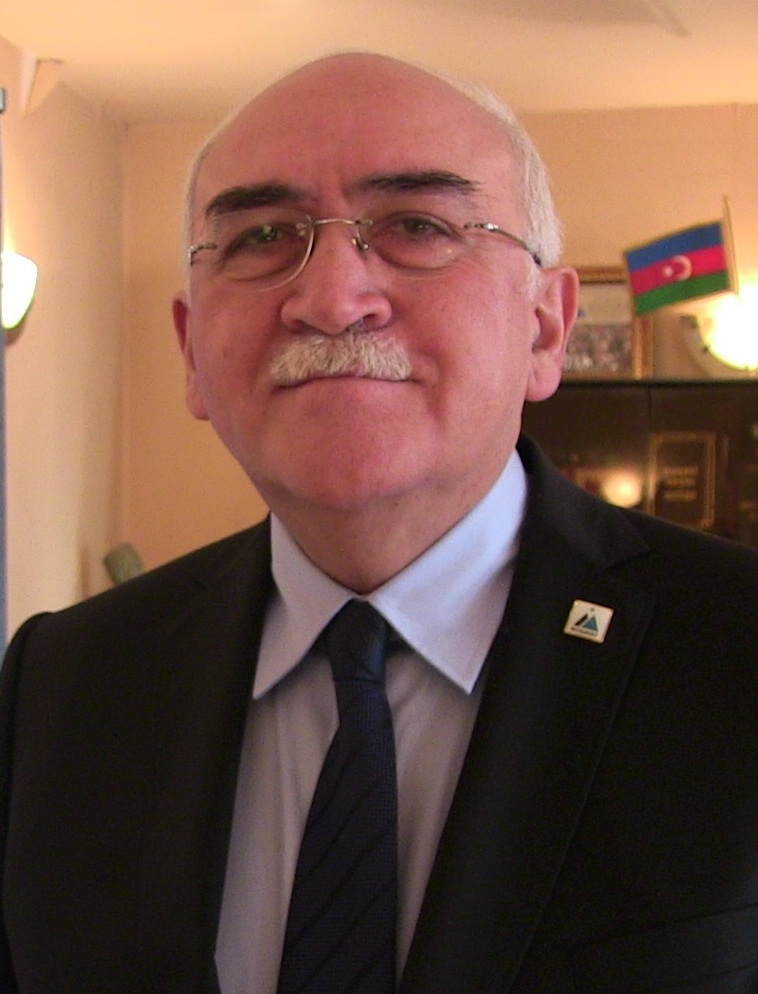
- Gambar in 2016

President of Azerbaijan
- Acting
- In office May 18, 1992 – June 17, 1992
- Prime Minister: Rahim Huseynov
- Preceded by: Ayaz Mutallibov
- Succeeded by: Abulfaz Elchibey

Chairman of the Supreme Soviet of Azerbaijan
- In office May 18, 1992 – June 15, 1993
- Preceded by: Yagub Mammadov
- Succeeded by: Heydar Aliyev

Personal details
- Born: İsa Yunis oğlu Qəmbər; February 24, 1957 (age 69) Baku, Azerbaijan SSR, Soviet Union (now Azerbaijan)
- Party: Müsavat
- Spouse: Aida Bağırova
- Children: 2

Isa Yunis oghlu Gambar (Azerbaijani: İsa Yunis oğlu Qəmbər), also known as Isa Gambar (born February 24, 1957), is an Azerbaijani politician and leader of the Equality Party (Müsavat), one of the opposition blocs in Azerbaijan. He was elected a member of parliament in 1990 and was elected parliamentary speaker in 1992.

A prominent opposition figure in Azerbaijan, Gambar was blocked from contesting elections by Azerbaijani ruler Heydar Aliyev. Aliyev stripped Gambar of parliamentary immunity and had him arrested when he criticized Aliyev's power grab in 1993. Criticism from abroad led Aliyev's regime to release Gambar a few weeks later.

Gambar was a close associate of independent Azerbaijan's first freely elected president Abulfaz Elchibey who was ousted in a military coup in June 1993.

During his time in parliament, Gambar worked with Elchibey to take the first steps to introducing market reforms in Azerbaijan.

== Biography details ==
In 1974, Isa Gambar completed secondary education at Baku High School No. 62. He graduated in 1979 from the Faculty of History at Baku State University (BSU). Following his graduation, he worked from 1979 to 1982 at the Research Center of the Nakhichivan Autonomous Republic. Between 1982 and 1990, he was a researcher at the Institute of Oriental Studies under the Azerbaijan Academy of Sciences.

From 1989 to 1991, he was actively involved with the Azerbaijan Academy of Sciences and emerged as one of the founders and leading figures of the Popular Front of Azerbaijan (PFA). During this period, from 1990 to 1991, he served as the deputy chairman of the PFA.

In 1990, he was elected as a Member of Parliament (MP). From 1991 to 1992, he held the position of Chairman of the Parliamentary Commission on Foreign Relations. In 1992, he was elected chairman (baskan) by the Congress of the Restoration Committee of the Equality Party (Azerbaijan).

In May 1992, he was elected Speaker of the Parliament. On June 17, 1992, he assumed the role of acting President of the Republic of Azerbaijan, during which he oversaw the country’s preparations for democratic elections. He resigned on June 15, 1993, following the overthrow of Azerbaijan's democratically elected president. Subsequently, on July 16, 1993, he was arrested by rebel forces led by Heydar Aliyev, who had seized power.

In 1999, and again from 2001 to 2003, he co-founded and chaired the Democratic Congress, a coalition of major Azerbaijani political parties. In 2000, he was awarded the "Friend of Journalists" prize in recognition of his support for press freedom.

In 2003, he became the sole presidential candidate representing the opposition electoral bloc “Bizim Azərbaycan” (“Our Azerbaijan”), a coalition of over 30 political parties.

Gambar is married and has two sons. His wife, Aida Bağırova, is a doctor of history, and a professor at Baku State University.

== 2003 elections ==
Human Rights Watch commented on the 2003 elections:

Human Rights Watch research found that the government had heavily intervened in the elections campaign in favour of Prime Minister İlham Aliyev, son of the current President Heydar Aliyev. The government had stacked the Central Election Commission and local election commission with its supporters, and banned local non-governmental organizations from monitoring the vote. As the elections drew nearer, government officials have openly sided with the campaign of İlham Aliyev, constantly obstructing opposition rallies and attempting to limit public participation in opposition events. In some cases, local officials have closed all the roads into town during opposition rallies, or have extended working and school hours, in one case, even declaring a Sunday work day, to prevent participation in opposition rallies.

== 2011 protests ==
In his role as leader of Müsavat, Gambar has played a major part in spring 2011 demonstrations inspired by other protests throughout the Middle East. He and his party have organized protests, occasionally joining with fellow opposition groups like the Popular Front Party to rally in Baku despite a government ban and the steadfast efforts of security forces to disperse gatherings and arrest activists. "There is a criminal, authoritarian and corrupt regime in Azerbaijan, and the people of Azerbaijan no longer want to live under these conditions," Gambar told The New York Times. In early April, Ilkin Gambar, the opposition leader's son currently serving in the Azerbaijani Army, claimed on his Facebook page that he was being sent to the front lines in Azerbaijan's standoff with Armenia and that his father had been "warned" that this could be a result of his continuing involvement in protests. For his part, Isa Gambar said, "The Ministry of Defence has a right to place soldiers in any location at its disposal. So I don't want to politicize this issue."

== See also ==
- Politics of Azerbaijan
- Supreme Soviet of Azerbaijan
- Foreign relations of Azerbaijan
- List of political parties in Azerbaijan

Political offices
Preceded by Ayaz Mütallibov	President of Azerbaijan; May 19, 1992 – June 16, 1992	Succeeded by Abulfaz Elchibey
