= Rahim Huseynov =

Azerbaijani politician (1936–2023)

- Rəhim Hüseynov
- Huseynov in 2013

Prime Minister of Azerbaijan
- In office 16 May 1992 – 26 January 1993
- President: Ayaz Mutallibov; Isa Gambar (acting); Abulfaz Elchibey
- Deputy: Artur Rasizade
- Preceded by: Hasan Hasanov; Firuz Mustafayev (acting)
- Succeeded by: Ali Masimov (acting); Panah Huseynov

Personal details
- Born: 5 April 1936 Baku, Azerbaijan SSR, Transcaucasian SFSR, USSR (now Azerbaijan)
- Died: 12 November 2023 (aged 87)
- Occupation: Engineer

Rahim Alihuseyn oghlu Huseynov (Azerbaijani: Rəhim Əlihüseyn oğlu Hüseynov; 5 April 1936 – 12 November 2023) was an Azerbaijani politician who was the third prime minister of Azerbaijan.

== Early life ==
Huseynov was born in Baku, Azerbaijan. He studied at the Moscow Institute of Steel and Alloys from 1953 through 1959, obtaining a degree in Metallurgy Engineering. From 1959–1962 he worked in various positions at the Azerbaijan Pipe Manufacturing Factory. From 1962 until 1965, Huseynov served as head of department at the Azerbaijan SSR State Planning Committee. From 1965–1965, he served as deputy manager of the financial technical supplies committee and as the chairman of the same government office. In the 1990's, Huseynov was a co-founder and chairman of Azerbaijani Scientists and Engineers Union.

== Political career ==
Huseynov was the chairman of the Azerbaijan State Planning Committee and deputy prime minister of Azerbaijan from 1989 through 1992. In May 1992, Huseynov was appointed prime minister of Azerbaijan and served until January 1993, when he resigned from the post of his own will. During his term in office, GNP fell by 20%.

== Death ==
Huseynov died on 12 November 2023, at the age of 87. He was buried next to his wife at Yasamal cemetery.

== Awards ==
Huseynov was awarded the Order of Friendship of Peoples, Order of the Red Banner of Labour and Order of the Badge of Honour during his career.

Political offices
Preceded by Hasan Hasanov	Prime Minister of Azerbaijan; 1992–1993	Succeeded by Panah Huseynov
