= Western Institute of Technology =

The Western Institute of Technology is the name given to a number of Institutes of technology or places of Higher education around the world.

These include:

- Western Institute of Technology (Philippines)
- Western Institute of Technology and Higher Education, Mexico
- Western Institute of Technology at Taranaki, New Zealand
- Western Australian Institute of Technology

== See also ==
- Eastern Institute of Technology
- National Institutes of Technology
- Western University (disambiguation)
