= Firuz Mustafayev =

Feyruz Mustafayev

Acting Prime Minister of Azerbaijan
- In office April 4, 1992 – May 16, 1992
- President: Yagub Mammadov (acting); Ayaz Mutallibov
- Preceded by: Hasan Hasanov
- Succeeded by: Rahim Huseynov

First Deputy Prime Minister of Azerbaijan
- In office May 22, 1991 – May 22, 1992

Personal details
- Born: October 18, 1933 Mərzili, Aghdam District, Azerbaijan SSR, TSFSR, USSR
- Died: July 7, 2018 (aged 84) Ganja, Azerbaijan
- Party: CPSU
- Education: Azerbaijan State Agricultural University
- Awards: Order of Lenin Order of the October Revolution Order of the Red Banner of Labour Order of the Badge of Honour

Feyruz Rajab oghlu Mustafayev (Azerbaijani: Feyruz Rəcəb oğlu Mustafayev / Фејруз Рәҹәб оғлу Мустафајев, October 18, 1933 — July 7, 2018) is an Azerbajaini politician who was Acting Prime Minister of the Republic of Azerbaijan (April 4, 1992 - May 16, 1992). He was First Deputy Prime Minister of Azerbaijan (May 22, 1991 — May 18, 1992).

He was President of the State Company "Azergushsanaye" of the Republic of Azerbaijan (February 8, 1993); President of the State Grain Products Company of the Republic of Azerbaijan (November 25, 1993 - October 16, 1994); Personal pensioner of the President of the Republic of Azerbaijan (October 2, 2002).

== Biography ==
Mustafayev was born on October 18, 1933, in Mərzili village of Aghdam District. After graduating from a seven-year school in his village, he continued his education at the Novruzlu village secondary school. After completing his military service in 1955, he began his career as an ordinary worker on the Samukh collective farm. Then he was elected an accountant, chairman of the collective farm trade union and chairman of the collective farm. During this period, he studied by correspondence at the Moscow Institute of Economics.

Mustafayev, who achieved high results in the collective farm, was appointed chairman of the Khanlar District Executive Committee. One year later, he was elected the first secretary of the Khanlar District Party Committee. Mustafayev was then appointed to the Shamakhi District.

In 1981, Heydar Aliyev, First Secretary of the Central Committee of the Communist Party of Azerbaijan, and Leonid Brezhnev, First Secretary of the Central Committee of the Communist Party of the Soviet Union, awarded him the Order of Lenin and Hero of Socialist Labour for his construction work in the Shamakhi District, such as 600 km of water lines and all similar construction works and reforms.

In 1975, when he was the first secretary of the Khanlar District Committee of the Communist Party of Azerbaijan, he was elected a deputy of the IX convocation of the Supreme Soviet of the Azerbaijan SSR from Qızılca constituency No. 343. He was a member of the Culture Commission.

In 1987, he became Deputy Chairman of the Agrarian Industry Committee, then Chairman of the Refugee Committee, President of the State Grain Company, Deputy Prime Minister and then Acting Prime Minister.

Feyruz Mustafayev died on July 7, 2018, in Baku.
