= Sanan Akhundov =

Azerbaijani statesman (born 1932)

Sanan Akhundov Sənan Axundov

Head of Azerbaijan State Standardization and Metrology Center
- In office 1991 – December 27, 2001
- Succeeded by: office abolished

USSR State Standards Committee, head of the Azerbaijan republic administration
- In office 1989–1991

Permanent Representative of the Council of Ministers of the Azerbaijan SSR to the Council of Ministers of the USSR
- In office 1987–1989

Minister of Local Industry of Azerbaijan SSR
- In office November 30, 1982 – April 9, 1987
- Preceded by: Ayaz Mutallibov
- Succeeded by: Habib Fataliyev

Personal details
- Born: March 28, 1932 Baku, Azerbaijan SSR, TSFSR, USSR
- Party: CPSU
- Awards: Order of Lenin Order of the October Revolution Order of the Red Banner of Labour Honored engineer of the Azerbaijan SSR

Sanan Samandar oghlu Akhundov (Azerbaijani: Sənan Səməndər oğlu Axundov, born March 28, 1932) is an Azerbaijani statesman, head of the Azerbaijan State Standardization and Metrology Center, Permanent Representative of the Azerbaijan SSR Council of Ministers to the USSR Council of Ministers (1987–1989), Minister of Local Industry of the Azerbaijan SSR (1982–1987).

== Life and career ==
Sanan Akhundov was born on March 28, 1932, in Baku. In 1950, he graduated from secondary school in Baku, and in 1955, he graduated from the Institute of Automechanics in Moscow.

Akhundov, who started working at the Baku Electric Machine Building Plant in 1958, worked here as a foreman, field, and then workshop chief, deputy chief engineer of the plant. In 1968–1972, he worked as the director of the Automobile Spare Parts Plant of the Ministry of Automobile Industry of the USSR, in 1972–1976 as the director of the Baku Household Air Conditioners Plant, in 1976–1982 as the director of the Union Electric Machinery BIB Household Air Conditioners Plant.

In 1982–1987, Sanan Akhundov worked as the Minister of Local Industry of the Azerbaijan SSR, in 1987–1989 as a Permanent Representative of the Council of Ministers of the Azerbaijan SSR under the Council of Ministers of the USSR. From June 1989, he worked as the head of the Azerbaijan republic administration of the USSR State Standards Committee, the head of the Azerbaijan State Center for Standardization and Metrology, and at the same time he was the chief inspector of the Republic of Azerbaijan for the control of standards and measuring instruments.

He has been a member of the Communist Party of the Soviet Union since 1962, and was a deputy of the Supreme Soviet of the Azerbaijan SSR for three convocations (9th–11th). He was awarded the orders of "Lenin", "October Revolution", "Red Banner of Labour", a number of medals and twice the honorary decree of the Presidium of the Supreme Soviet of the Azerbaijan SSR. In 1991, he was awarded the honorary title of "Honored Engineer of Azerbaijan SSR".
