= Ayaz Mutallibov =

President of Azerbaijan from 1990 to 1992

- Ayaz Mütəllibov
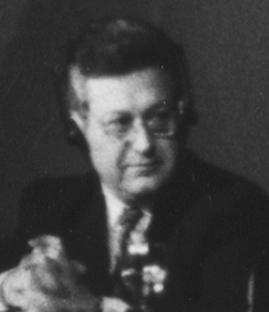
- Mutallibov in 1992

1st President of Azerbaijan
- In office 18 May 1990 (Note: As president of the Azerbaijan SSR, then part of the Soviet Union.) – 6 March 1992
- Prime Minister: Hasan Hasanov
- Preceded by: Position established (Himself as First Secretary of the Azerbaijan Communist Party)
- Succeeded by: Yaqub Mammadov (acting)
- In office 14 – 18 May 1992
- Prime Minister: Firuz Mustafayev (acting); Rahim Huseynov
- Preceded by: Yaqub Mammadov (acting)
- Succeeded by: Isa Gambar (acting); Abulfaz Elchibey

First Secretary of the Azerbaijan Communist Party
- In office 25 January 1990 – 14 September 1991
- General Secretary: Mikhail Gorbachev
- Preceded by: Abdulrahman Vezirov
- Succeeded by: Position abolished (Himself as President of Azerbaijan)

Full member of the 28th Politburo
- In office 14 July 1990 – 29 August 1991

Chairman of the Council of Ministers of the Azerbaijan SSR
- In office 27 January 1989 – 26 January 1990
- First Secretary: Abdurrahman Vazirov
- Preceded by: Hasan Sayidov
- Succeeded by: Hasan Hasanov

Chairman of the State Planning Committee of the Azerbaijan SSR
- In office 30 October 1982 – 27 January 1989
- Preceded by: Sabit Abbasaliyev
- Succeeded by: Rahim Huseynov

Minister of Local Industry of the Azerbaijan SSR
- In office 4 July 1979 – 30 October 1982
- Preceded by: Alibala Asadullayev
- Succeeded by: Sanan Akhundov

Personal details
- Born: Ayaz Niyazi oghlu Mutallibov; 12 May 1938 Baku, Azerbaijan SSR, Soviet Union
- Died: 27 March 2022 (aged 83) Baku, Azerbaijan
- Party: Azerbaijan Communist Party (1963–1991); Independent (1991–1999, 2012–2022); Civic Unity Party (1999–2003); Social Democratic Party (2003–2012)
- Spouse: Adila Mutallibova (m. 1961; died 2019)
- Children: 2
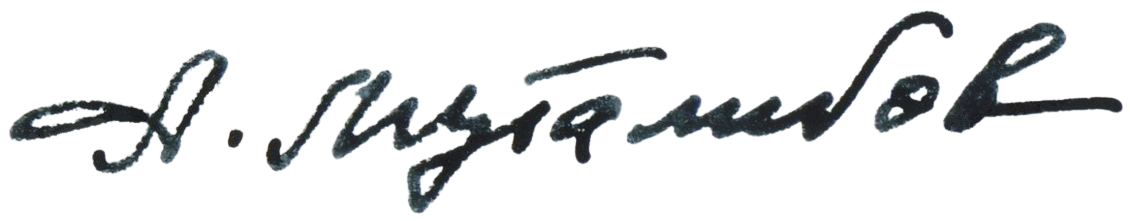
- Signature

Ayaz Niyazi oghlu Mutallibov (Note: Azerbaijani: Ајаз Нијази оғлу Мүтәллибов, romanized: Ayaz Niyazi oğlu Mütəllibov, Russian: Аяз Ниязович Муталибов, romanized: Ayaz Niyazovich Mutalibov) (12 May 1938 – 27 March 2022) was an Azerbaijani politician who served as the first president of Azerbaijan. He was the last leader of Soviet Azerbaijan, and first President of Azerbaijan from 18 May 1990 until 6 March 1992 and from 14 May until 18 May 1992.

He rose through the ranks of the Azerbaijan Communist Party during Soviet Azerbaijan before becoming leader of the party in 1990. Later that year, the Supreme Soviet of Azerbaijan SSR elected Mutallibov as the first President of Azerbaijan SSR. In September 1991, amid the collapse of the Soviet Union and independence of Azerbaijan, Mutallibov declared himself President of Azerbaijan in an uncontested election. He was ousted from power in May 1992 when he tried to cancel the forthcoming presidential election.

== Early life and career ==
Mutallibov was born on 12 May 1938, in Baku to the family of a physician and later World War II veteran, Niyazi Ashraf oghlu Mutallibov (Azerbaijani: Niyazi Əşrəf oğlu Mütəllibov), and gynaecologist Kubra Mutallibova (died in 1988). Both of his parents were from Shamakhi.

In 1956, Ayaz Mutallibov graduated from the secondary school #189 in Baku. During his youth he was fond of jazz music. He was a member of the school volleyball team. In 1956–62, Mutallibov attended the Azerbaijan State Institute of Petroleum and Chemistry.

In 1964, he became the director of the Baku Refrigerator Factory, and in 1974, he was appointed the General Director of the "BakElectroBytMash" State Industrial Company.

== Political career ==
In 1977, he was appointed Second Secretary of the Azerbaijan Communist Party Committee in the Narimanov District of Baku. In 1979, he was promoted to the republic's Council of Ministers, assuming the post of Minister of Local Industry of the Azerbaijan SSR. In 1982, he became Chairman of the State Planning Committee and Deputy Chairman of the Council of Ministers of the Azerbaijan SSR. In January 1989, he was appointed Chairman of the Council of Ministers of the Azerbaijan SSR.

== Party leadership and Presidency of Azerbaijan ==
On 24 January 1990, four days after Soviet troops entered Baku, marking the beginning of the Black January crackdown, Mutallibov, at this point in Moscow, is appointed the First Secretary of the Azerbaijan Communist Party.

On 18 May 1990, the Supreme Soviet of Azerbaijan SSR elected Mutallibov as the first President of Azerbaijan SSR. In December 1990, at Mutallibov's initiative, the Supreme Soviet of the Azerbaijan SSR officially renamed the country to the Azerbaijan Republic and adopted the Declaration of Sovereignty.

On 17 March 1991, under pressure from Mutallibov, the Supreme Soviet of Azerbaijan voted for the participation of Azerbaijan in the referendum on the fate of the Soviet Union. On 19 August 1991, according to some reports, while on a visit to Tehran, Mutalibov made a statement in support of the Soviet coup attempt of 1991. However, in 2016, the ex-president of Azerbaijan said that he did not support the putschists.

In September 1991, amid the collapse of the Soviet Union and independence of Azerbaijan, Mutallibov dissolved the Communist Party of Azerbaijan declared himself President of Azerbaijan in an uncontested election. Mutallibov negotiated with the opposition, in particularly the Popular Front party, during his presidency. After pressure from the Popular Front, Mutallibov established a parliament where power was divided between opposition figures and the communist old guard.

=== Ousting ===
On 6 March 1992, under pressure from Azerbaijan Popular Front amid substantial Azerbaijani losses in the First Nagorno-Karabakh War, Mutallibov was forced to submit his resignation to the National Assembly of Azerbaijan. He handed the presidency to his ally Yaqub Mammadov. On 14 May, the Supreme Soviet of Azerbaijan, dominated by the former members of the Communist Party of Azerbaijan, heard the case on Khojaly Massacre, relieved Mutallibov of any responsibility, and reversed his prior resignation, restoring him as the President of Azerbaijan.

Upon taking the powers of the presidency again, Mutallibov cancelled the forthcoming presidential elections, which were set to take place on 7 June 1992. A day later, armed forces led by the Azerbaijan Popular Front under the command of Police Colonel Isgandar Hamidov, took control of the offices of the Parliament of Azerbaijan and Azerbaijani State Radio and Television, thereby deposing Mutallibov, who left for Moscow. The defunct Supreme Soviet of Azerbaijan was dissolved passing the duties to the National Assembly of Azerbaijan formed by equal representation of Azerbaijan Popular Front and former communists. Isa Gambar of the Popular Front party was subsequently made acting president; Gambar reinstated the upcoming presidential elections which were won by Abulfaz Elchibey.

== Exile ==
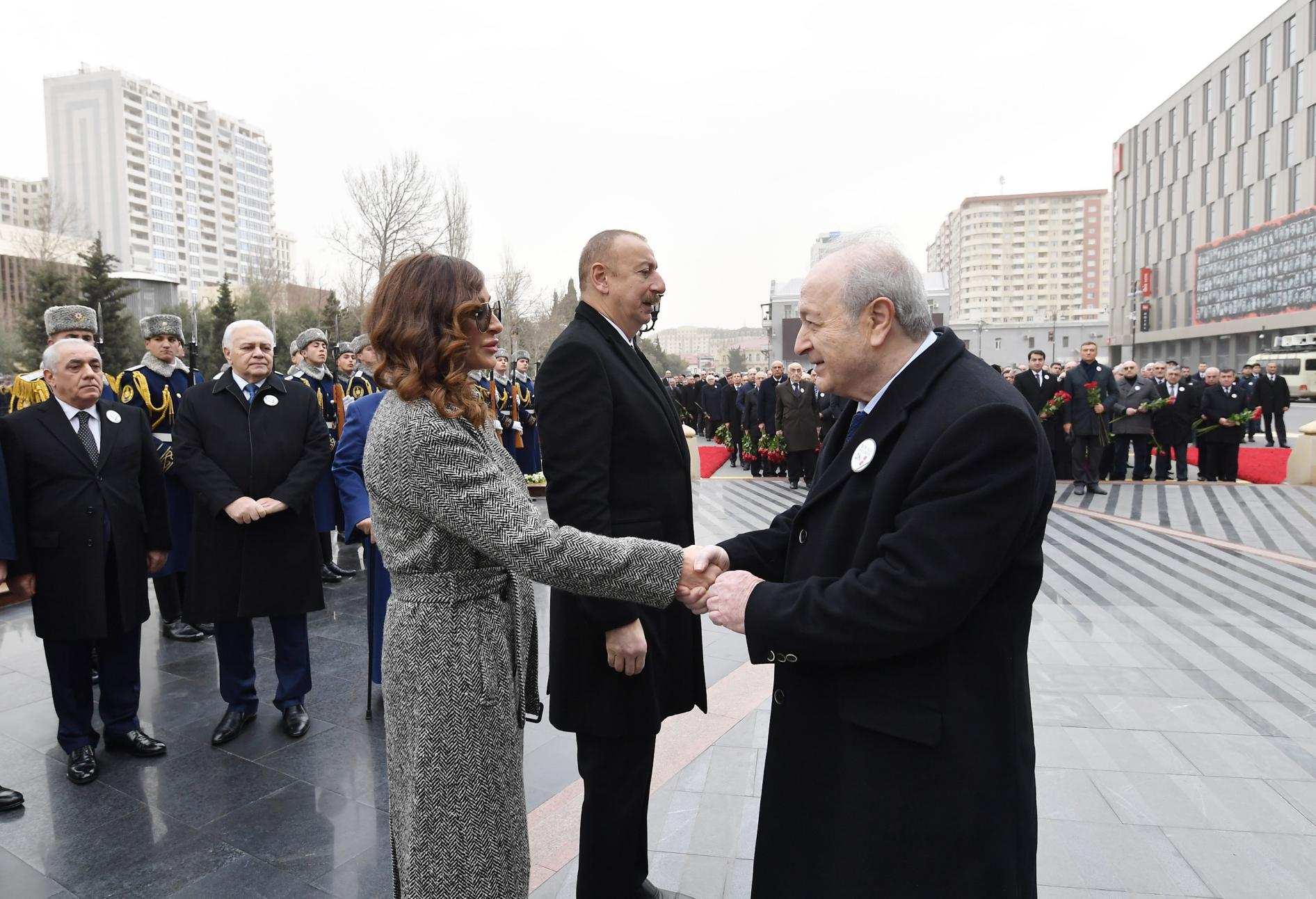
Mutallibov (right), President Ilham Aliyev (center) and First Lady Mehriban Aliyeva, 2020

Mutallibov was in exile in Moscow from May 1992 until July 2012. In April 2000, his followers in Baku declared the formation of the new Civil Union Party. In 2003 he joined the Azerbaijan Social Democratic Party (ASDP) and became its co-chairman in exile. His son Azad died of cancer on 9 August 2011, leaving only Zaur. In July 2012, Mutallibov returned from exile with the permission of President Ilham Aliyev to attend his son's funeral. It was his first visit to the country after 1992.

=== Death ===
He died at the age of 83 on 27 March 2022, in Baku after a long illness, having been hospitalized for some time.

== Personal life ==
Mutallibov was married to Adila Mutallibova, who died in 2019. Mutalibov met his wife in 1956 at the birthday party of a mutual friend. They had two sons, Azad and Zaur, grandson Tahir and granddaughter Madina. In an interview with Express Gazeta, Mutallibov spoke about his youthful hobbies, saying he loved to listen to jazz, Elvis Presley, and The Beatles, for which he was often criticized by a Komsomol newspaper. In his youth he was also actively involved in sports and was fond of volleyball.

== Works ==
- (2000) 70 mgnoveniĭ 7 let 70 мгновений 7 лет [70 moments of 7 years]. Sovremennik.
- (2001) Karabakh — chernyĭ sad: dokumentalʹnoe povestvovanie Карабах — черный сад: документальное повествование [Karabakh—black garden: a documental account]. Sovremennik. ISBN 9785852341532. OCLC 648995695.

== Awards ==
- 2 Orders of the Red Banner of Labor

== See also ==
- President of Azerbaijan
- Politics of Azerbaijan
- National Assembly of Azerbaijan
- Foreign relations of Azerbaijan
- List of political parties in Azerbaijan

== Notes ==
Party political offices
Preceded by Abdulrahman Vezirov	First Secretary of the Azerbaijan Communist Party; 1990–1991	Succeeded by none
Political offices
Preceded by none	President of Azerbaijan; 18 May 1990 – 6 March 1992	Succeeded by Yaqub Mammadov
Preceded by Yaqub Mammadov	President of Azerbaijan; 14 May 1992 – 18 May 1992	Succeeded by İsa Qambar
