= Hasan Hasanov =

Azerbaijani politician and diplomat

- Həsən Həsənov
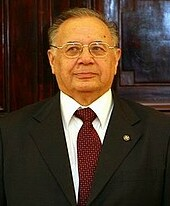
- Hasanov in 2010

Minister of Foreign Affairs
- In office 2 September 1993 – 16 February 1998
- President: Heydar Aliyev
- Preceded by: Tofig Gasimov
- Succeeded by: Tofig Zulfugarov

Prime Minister of Azerbaijan
- In office 5 February 1991 – 4 April 1992
- President: Ayaz Mutallibov; Yagub Mammadov (acting)
- Preceded by: Position established (Himself as Chairman of the Council of Ministers of the Azerbaijan SSR)
- Succeeded by: Firuz Mustafayev (acting); Rahim Huseynov

Chairman of the Council of Ministers of the Azerbaijan SSR
- In office 26 January 1990 – 5 February 1991
- President: Ayaz Mutallibov
- Preceded by: Ayaz Mutallibov
- Succeeded by: Position abolished (Himself as Prime Minister of Azerbaijan)

Personal details
- Born: October 20, 1940 (age 86) Tbilisi, Georgian SSR, Soviet Union (now Georgia)

Hasan Aziz oghlu Hasanov (Azerbaijani: Həsən Əziz oğlu Həsənov / Һәсән Әзиз оғлу Һәсәнов, born 20 October 1940) is an Azerbaijani politician and diplomat. He served as Azerbaijan's last communist leader, as its Prime Minister of Azerbaijan both during the Soviet rule and Azerbaijan's subsequent independence after the collapse of Soviet Union but eventually resigned.

== Early life ==
Hasanov was born in Tbilisi. Having completed his secondary education in Tbilisi, he moved to Baku, Azerbaijan to study at Azerbaijan Technical University in 1958. In 1963, Hasanov graduated from the university and in 1981 from Baku Supreme Party School. While a student, he chaired the group, faculty, and institute Komsomol committee. In 1962, Hasanov was sent to the 14th annual All Soviet Komsomol Summit being held in Moscow as the representative of Azerbaijani students. In 1960–1963, he served as Chairman of the Baku Student Council; in 1962 through 1966, he worked as a tutor in Baku Komsomol Committee and chaired the Yasamal Komsomol Committee. In 1966–1967, during his doctoral studies, Hasanov conducted scientific research at Scientific Research Construction Materials and Establishments Institute. In 1967, he was appointed to the position of tutor at Central Committee of Azerbaijan Communist Party.

== Political career ==
After working in the organization committee of Komsomol's central office in Moscow for two years, Hasanov moved back to Baku in 1971 and worked as tutor and deputy department director of Azerbaijan Communist Party. Later on, he worked as the First Secretary of Sabail district in 1975–1978, as First Secretary of Sumgayit Party Committee in 1978–1979 and as First Secretary of Ganja Party Committee in 1979–1981. From 1981 through 1990, Hasanov served as Secretary of Central Committee of Azerbaijan Communist Party and member of bureau and chaired the economic policies committee at the same institution from 1989 until 1990.

Hasanov was the Prime Minister of Azerbaijan during the most difficult period of the country, in 1990–1992. After Azerbaijan became independent, he was put in charge to form the new government of Azerbaijan. Understanding the difficulties, Hasanov made a deal with the Popular Front of Azerbaijan inviting them to form a coalition within the newly established government. In 1992–1998, he served in diplomatic service of independent Azerbaijan and was the first Azerbaijani to receive the status of Azerbaijan's Ambassador Extraordinary and Plenipotentiary. In 1992–1993, Hasanov established and worked in the Permanent Mission of Azerbaijan Republic to UN in New York City. From 1993 through 1998, he served as the Minister of Foreign Affairs of Azerbaijan.

Hasanov has been a member of various parliaments for 23 years straight: in 1977–1995 as deputy of Supreme Soviet of Azerbaijan; in 1979–1984 as deputy of Supreme Soviet of the Soviet Union; in 1995–2000 as member of National Assembly of Azerbaijan (Milli Majlis). He was also a member of the International Relations Committee of Milli Majlis and a member of the committee writing the new Azerbaijani Constitution. From 2004 until 2010, Hasanov served as Ambassador Extraordinary and Plenipotentiary of the Republic of Azerbaijan to Hungary. On 30 March 2010, he was appointed the Ambassador of Azerbaijan to Poland. On 8 January 2021, Hasanov was dismissed as the Ambassador of Azerbaijan to Poland, Nargiz Gurbanova was appointed a new ambassador by a presidential decree.

== Private life ==
He's married, and has two children, Aygun and Zaur, and grandchildren. Hasanov is fluent in Azerbaijani, English, Russian, Turkish and Georgian.

== Awards ==
Hasan Hasanov was awarded the Order of the Red Banner of Labour in 1981. He has also received the Azerbaijani Shohrat Order and For Service to the Fatherland Order. In 2020 he received the Commander's Cross of the Order of Merit of the Republic of Poland. In 2022, he became an Honorary Citizen of Tbilisi.

Political offices
Preceded by Ayaz Mutallibov	Prime Minister of Azerbaijan; 1990–1992	Succeeded by Firuz Mustafayev
