= Nargiz Gurbanova =

Azerbaijani diplomat (born 1975)

Ambassador of Azerbaijan to Poland
- Incumbent
- Assumed office 8 January 2021
- President: Ilham Aliyev
- Preceded by: Hasan Hasanov

Ambassador of Azerbaijan to Bulgaria
- In office 12 January 2016 – 8 January 2021

Personal details
- Born: 1975 (age 50–51)

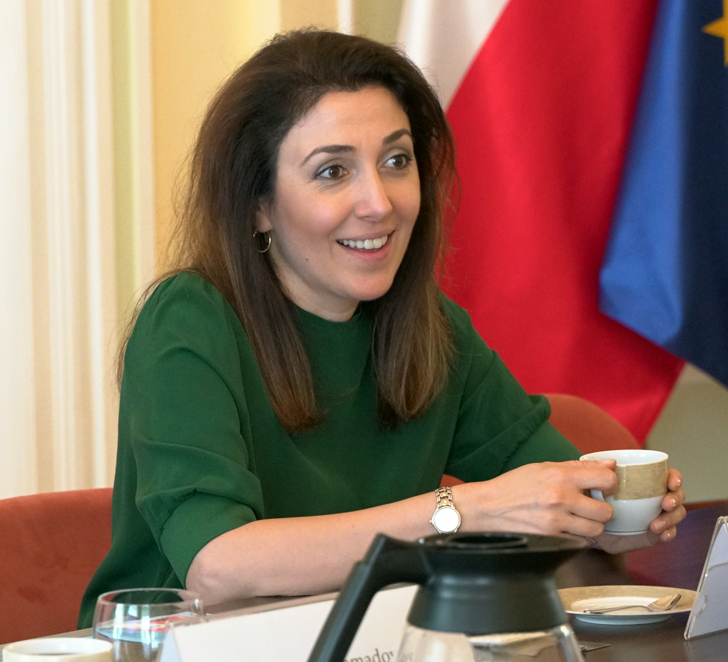
Nargiz Gurbanova

Nargiz Akif gizi Gurbanova (Azerbaijani: Nərgiz Akif qızı Qurbanova, born 1975) is an Azerbaijani diplomat, serving as the Ambassador of Azerbaijan to Poland since 2021.

== Education ==
Gurbanova graduated from the University of Vienna with a Ph.D. in political science. She also received BA/MA in international relations from the Baku State University and M.Sc. in international management from the Western University in Azerbaijan. Gurbanova also studied international business at the Jönköping International Business School in Sweden and international law at the University of Nice in France.

== Diplomatic service ==
Gurbanova served as director of the Department for Economic Cooperation and Development at the Ministry of Foreign Affairs of Azerbaijan. She then served in Azerbaijan's embassies in Austria and the United States, at the latter as Counselor, Chargé d'Affaires and Deputy Chief of Mission.

On 8 January 2021, Gurbanova was appointed the Ambassador of Azerbaijan to Poland by a presidential decree, succeeding Hasan Hasanov. She previously served as the ambassador to Bulgaria, from January 12, 2016, to January 8, 2021.

== Personal life ==
Gurbanova is married and has one son.
