= Fuad Guliyev =

Former Prime Minister of Azerbaijan

- Fuad Quliyev

5th Prime Minister of Azerbaijan
- In office 2 May 1995 – 20 July 1996
- President: Heydar Aliyev
- Preceded by: Surat Huseynov
- Succeeded by: Artur Rasizade

Personal details
- Born: 6 July 1941 (age 85) Baku, Azerbaijan SSR, Soviet Union

Fuad Halil oghlu Guliyev (Azerbaijani: Fuad Xəlil oğlu Quliyev (Latin), Фуад Хәлил оғлу Гулиев (Cyrillic), IPA: [fuˈad χæˈlil oɣˈlu ɡuˈlijef]; Russian: Фуа́д Хали́лович Кули́ев, IPA: [fuˈat xɐˈlʲiləvʲɪtɕ kuˈlʲijɪf]); born 6 July 1941), was the 5th Prime Minister of Azerbaijan.

== Early life ==
Fuad Guliyev was born on 6 July 1941 in Baku, Azerbaijan. He attended Secondary School No. 160 in Baku from 1948 through 1958, after which he was admitted to the Azerbaijan State Oil Academy. In 1963, he graduated with a degree in Petroleum Engineering.

Between 1963 and 1965, Guliyev served in the administrative division of a cement factory in Krychaw, Belarus. Upon returning to Baku, Fuad Guliyev held various managerial positions at the Research and Design Institute of Petroleum Engineering between 1965 and 1973, contributing to the development of innovative technologies in Azerbaijan's oil industry.

From 1973 to 1977, Guliyev held the position of Head of the Production Department, followed by his appointment as Chief Engineer of the Baku Air-Conditioners Factory from 1977 to 1982.

In 1982, prior to Heydar Aliyev's departure as First Secretary of the Azerbaijan Communist Party, he appointed Guliyev as Director of the Baku Air-Conditioners Factory. Fuad Guliyev remained in this position until 1994.

== Political career ==
Following Heydar Aliyev's return to power as the President of Azerbaijan Republic, Guliyev was appointed First Deputy Prime Minister of Azerbaijan. Priority tasks assigned to Guliyev were implementing reforms in the agricultural sector and preventing further inflation. In May 1995, Guliyev was appointed Prime Minister of Azerbaijan, succeeding Suret Huseynov, and served in this capacity until July 1996. In November 1995, Guliyev was elected as a Deputy to the National Assembly of Azerbaijan. During his term, he participated in a United Nations project to designate Sumgait as a free economic zone and signed contracts with foreign oil companies for the exploration, development, and production of the Karabakh oil field.

In 1996, Guliyev stepped down from the position of Prime Minister due to health concerns. He was succeeded by Artur Rasizade.

== Awards ==
Guliyev has been awarded with various orders and medals of USSR for his innovations in the agricultural sector of economy and received recognition awards from Azerbaijani leadership for his contributions in the oil industry of the country. Guliyev holds the titles of Recognised Engineer of Azerbaijan, Laureate of the State Prize of Azerbaijan, and is a recipient of following the Soviet orders: the Order of the Badge of Honour and the Order of the Red Banner of Labour.
