= Panah Huseyn =

Azerbaijani politician (born 1957)

- Pənah Hüseyn
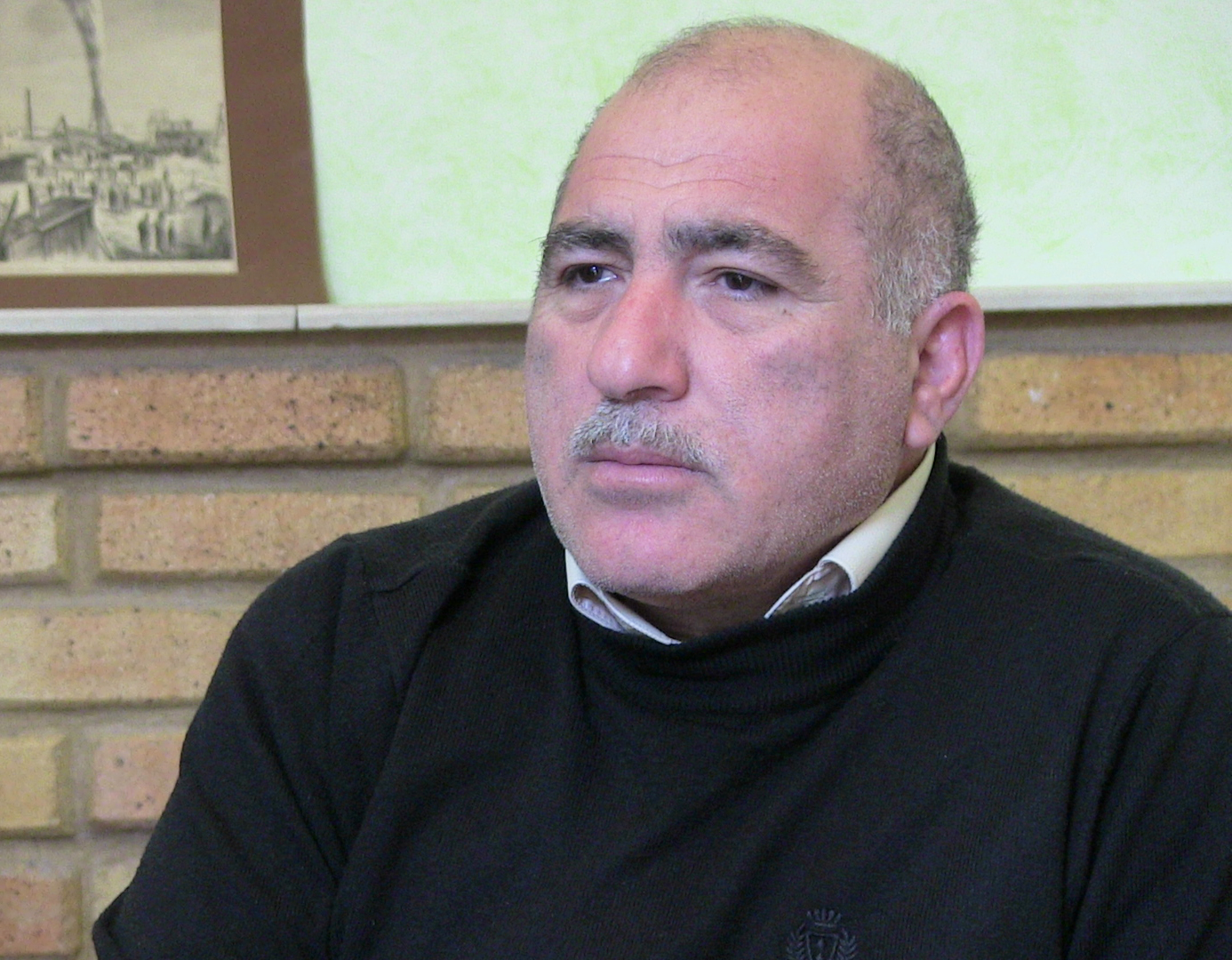
- Huseyn in 2015

Prime Minister of Azerbaijan
- In office 28 April 1993 – 7 June 1993
- President: Abulfaz Elchibey
- Preceded by: Rahim Huseynov; Ali Masimov (acting)
- Succeeded by: Suret Huseynov

Personal details
- Born: 28 October 1957 (age 68) Garagashly village of Sabirabad, Azerbaijan SSR (now Azerbaijan)
- Occupation: Historian

Panah Chodar oghlu Huseyn (Azerbaijani: Pənah Çodar oğlu Hüseyn, born 28 October 1957), also known as Panah Huseynli, was the 1st Secretary of State and 5th Prime Minister of Azerbaijan.

== Early life ==
Huseyn was born in Garagashli village of Sabirabad Rayon region of Azerbaijan. He graduated with a degree in History from the Azerbaijan State University. In 1980 through 1983, he worked as a teacher in a secondary school in the Sabirabad district and was a scientific researcher at a History Museum. In 1997–2000, Huseynov worked at the Philosophy and Law Institute of Azerbaijan National Academy of Sciences in Baku.

== Political career ==
Huseyn is one of the co-founders of Azerbaijan Popular Front. With the arrival of the Azerbaijan Popular Front in power in May 1992, Panah Huseyn was appointed the Secretary of State of the Azerbaijan Republic. In early 1993, he became the Prime Minister of Azerbaijan but was removed in June 1993 following demands from the rebelling general Suret Huseynov (unrelated to Panah Huseynov) to sack Huseynov and dissolve the Cabinet of Ministers. He was then replaced by Suret Huseynov himself after Heydar Aliyev came to power in June 1993.

In 2005 Parliamentary elections, Huseyn was elected a deputy from Sabirabad district. He also serves as member of commissions on national security and defense issues of National Assembly of Azerbaijan and is a member of Azerbaijan-France, Azerbaijan-Iran, Azerbaijan-Russia, Azerbaijan-Turkey inter-parliamentary working groups. Huseynov was arrested on charges of organizing disorders in Baku after the results of parliamentary elections were announced in 2005 but was pardoned later on.

== Personal life ==
Huseyn is married and has 3 children. He is fluent in Russian and English.

Political offices
Preceded by Rahim Huseynov	Prime Minister of Azerbaijan; 1993	Succeeded by Surat Huseynov
