= Western University =

Western University may refer to:

== Canada ==
- University of Western Ontario, a public university in London, Ontario, Canada

== United States ==
- Western Illinois University, a public university in Macomb, Illinois, United States
- Western Connecticut State University, a public university in Danbury, Connecticut
- Western Reserve University, a former name of Case Western Reserve University, a private research university in Cleveland, Ohio
- Western Washington University, a public university located in Bellingham, Washington, United States
- Western University (Kansas), a historically black college in Quindaro, Kansas, United States from 1865 to 1943
- Western University of Health Sciences, a private graduate-level university in Pomona, California, United States
- Western University of Pennsylvania, a former name of the University of Pittsburgh from 1819 to 1908
- Western Colorado University, a public university in Gunnison, Colorado

== Azerbaijan ==
- Western Caspian University, a private university in Baku, Azerbaijan

== See also ==
- Midwestern University, Illinois and Arizona
