= Ali Masimli =

Azerbaijani politician (born 1953)

- Əli Məsimli
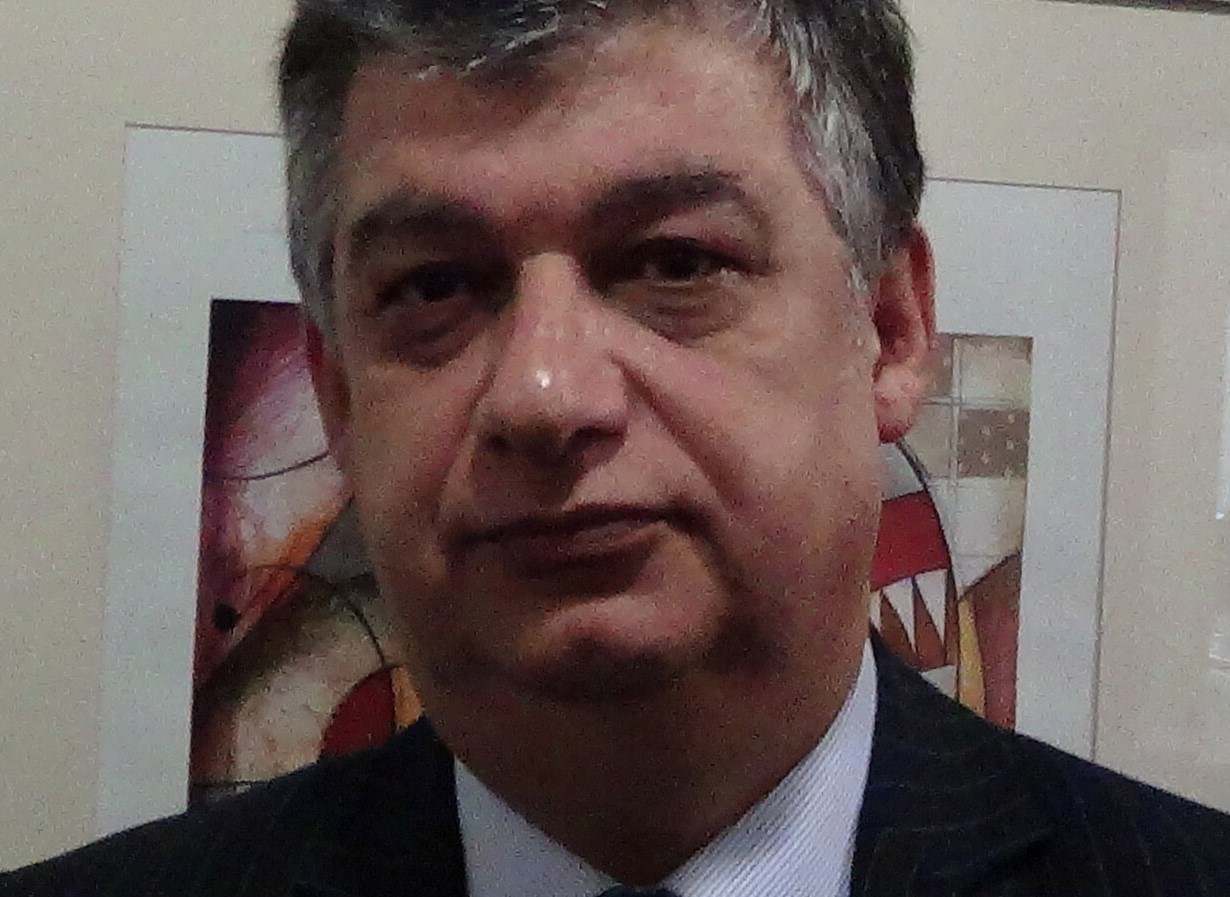
- Masimli in 2015

Prime Minister of Azerbaijan
- Acting
- In office 26 January 1993 – 28 April 1993
- President: Abulfaz Elchibey
- Preceded by: Rahim Huseynov
- Succeeded by: Panah Huseynov

Personal details
- Born: 3 January 1953 (age 73) Shaki, Azerbaijan SSR, Soviet Union
- Occupation: Economist

Ali Ahmad oghlu Masimli (Azerbaijani: Əli Əhməd oğlu Məsimli; born 3 January 1953) is an Azerbaijani politician who served as First Deputy Prime Minister of Azerbaijan on Economic Policies and acted as Prime Minister of Azerbaijan for a brief period of time.

== Early life ==
Masimli was born in Shaki, Azerbaijan. After completion of secondary school in 1970, Masimov was admitted to Azerbaijan State Economic University. He graduated with a degree in economics in 1975 and got enrolled in PhD program at Economics Institute of Azerbaijan National Academy of Sciences. In 1975–1976, he served in the Soviet Army and was stationed in Kazakhstan. Once the military service was completed, Masimov continued his doctoral studies in Baku, then at the USSR Academy of Sciences in Moscow in 1979–1980. After graduation, he continued his work at Azerbaijan National Academy of Sciences.

== Political career ==
Starting from December 1991 through 1993, Masimov held various high ranking positions within the government of independent Azerbaijan Republic. He was the Director of Department for Coordination of Economic Policies of the state at Presidential Apparatus, chairman of Azerbaijan's Foreign Investment Committee, chairman of State Economic Planning Committee and Minister of Economic Development within the two-year period. From 26 January until 28 April 1993, Masimov was Acting Prime Minister of Azerbaijan. He authored the Azerbaijan Economic Progress Program and Main policies of Cabinet of Ministers program while in office. He also laid the foundation of Azerbaijan's Economic Independence Concepts and Agricultural Reforms Program. Masimli is also known to have founded the Assistance Fund for Refugees and IDPs in 1993. Masimov is an author to nearly 1,200 scientific publications distributed in Germany, Sweden, Russia and Turkey.

During 2005 Parliamentary elections, Masimov was elected to the National Assembly of Azerbaijan with 33.97% of votes from his district, Shaki. Masimov is currently a member of opposition alliance bloc YeS (New Policy) since 2005. He is also a member of permanent parliamentary commission on economic problems.

Political offices
Preceded by Rahim Huseynov	Prime Minister of Azerbaijan; 1993	Succeeded by Panah Huseynov
