= Yagub Eyyubov =

- Yaqub Eyyubov
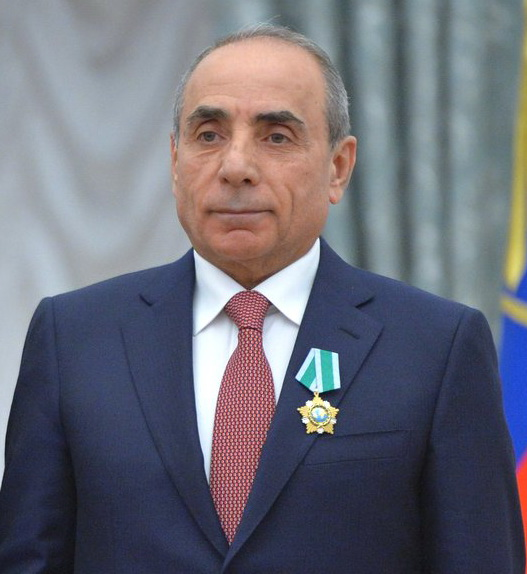
- Eyyubov in 2016

First Deputy Prime Minister of Azerbaijan
- Incumbent
- Assumed office 13 February 2003
- President: Heydar Aliyev; Ilham Aliyev
- Prime Minister: Artur Rasizade; Ilham Aliyev; Artur Rasizade; Novruz Mammadov; Ali Asadov
- Preceded by: Abbas Abbasov

Personal details
- Born: October 24, 1945 (age 80) Mingachevir, Azerbaijan SSR, Soviet Union
- Party: New Azerbaijan Party

Yagub Abdulla oghlu Eyyubov (Azerbaijani: Yaqub Eyyubov Abdulla oğlu; born 24 October 1945) is an Azerbaijani politician who has been First Deputy Prime Minister of Azerbaijan since 2003.

== Early years ==
Eyyubov was born Mingachevir in 1945. He studied at Azerbaijan Technical University in 1963, and briefly worked at the Sattarkhan Plant (then the Lieutenant Schmidt Plant) in 1964 before being conscripted into the Soviet Army from 1964 until 1967. In 1968, after returning to Baku, he continued his education at Azerbaijan Technical University and graduated in 1972 with a degree in construction engineering. While at the university, he served as chairman of the Komsomol Committee of the Construction from 1970 through 1972. From 1975 to 1997, Eyyubov worked time as a senior professor, and as the assistant dean, at the Azerbaijan Architecture and Construction University.

== Political career ==
He came into the Cabinet of Azerbaijan as Deputy Prime Minister in 1999 and served until 2003. On 13 February 2003 he was appointed as First Deputy Prime Minister of Azerbaijan.

Eyyubov has chaired the Interdepartmental Committee for Protection of State Secrets under the President of Azerbaijan, and the Committee for Cooperation with NATO under the President of Azerbaijan (established on 14 November 1997) and currently co-chairs the following commissions under the Ministry of Economic Development:

- Azerbaijan-Tajikistan Intergovernmental Commission on Trade and Economic Relations;
- Azerbaijan-Dagestan (Russian Federation) Intergovernmental Commission for Cooperation on Economic and Humanitarian Issues
- Azerbaijan-Belarus Intergovernmental Commission for Bilateral Cooperation on Economic Relations
- Azerbaijan-Moldova Bilateral Economic Cooperation Commission
- Azerbaijan-Pakistan Bilateral Commission
- Azerbaijan-Uzbekistan Intergovernmental Commission
- Azerbaijan-Romania Joint Intergovernmental Commission on Scientific and Technical Cooperation and Trade and Economic Relations
- Azerbaijan-Saudi Arabia Joint Intergovernmental Commission on Economic, Trade, Investment, Cultural, Sports and Youth Relations
- Azerbaijan-Russia Intergovernmental Commission on Economic Cooperation
- Azerbaijan-Moscow State Commission on Cooperation
- Azerbaijan-Ukraine Intergovernmental Commission on Economic Cooperation
- Azerbaijan-Turkmenistan Intergovernmental Committee for Cooperation on Economic and Humanitarian Issues
- Azerbaijan-Romania Joint Intergovernmental Commission on Scientific and Technical Cooperation and Trade, Economic and Cultural Relations.

In September 2009, he was also appointed to develop the oil and gas strategy of Azerbaijan by President Ilham Aliyev.

== Awards ==
- Sharaf Order (23 October 2015)
- Order of Friendship (22 September 2015)
- Order of Honor (22 October 2015)
