= Teymur Guliyev =

Soviet politician (1888–1965)

- Teymur Quliyev
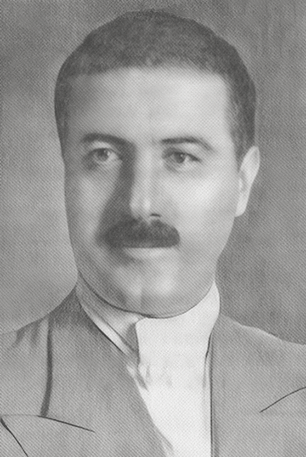

Premier of the Azerbaijan SSR
- In office 13 November 1937 – 18 April 1953
- Preceded by: Huseyn Rahmanov
- Succeeded by: Mir Jafar Baghirov
- In office 17 August 1953 – 9 March 1954
- Preceded by: Mir Jafar Baghirov
- Succeeded by: Sadig Rahimov

First Deputy Premier of the Azerbaijan SSR
- In office 18 April 1953 – 17 August 1953

Personal details
- Born: 25 November 1888 Jabrayil, Jebrail uezd, Elizavetpol Governorate, Russian Empire
- Died: 18 November 1965 (aged 76) Baku, Azerbaijan SSR, Soviet Union
- Party: CPSU

Teymur Guliyev (Azerbaijani: Teymur Quliyev; 25 November 1888, Jabrayil – 18 November 1965, Baku) was the chairman of the Council of People's Commissars of the Transcaucasian Socialist Federative Soviet Republic from 1937 to 1946, chairman of the Council of Ministers from 1946 to 1953, and 1953 to 1954.

== See also ==
- Prime Minister of Azerbaijan
