= Surat Huseynov =

Azerbaijani colonel and politician (1959–2023)

- Surət Hüseynov

Prime Minister of Azerbaijan
- In office 30 June 1993 – 7 October 1994
- President: Heydar Aliyev
- Preceded by: Panah Huseynov
- Succeeded by: Fuad Guliyev

Personal details
- Born: 12 February 1959 Kirovabad, Azerbaijan SSR, USSR (now Ganja, Azerbaijan)
- Died: 31 July 2023 (aged 64) Istanbul, Turkey

Surat Davud oghlu Huseynov (Azerbaijani: Surət Davud oğlu Hüseynov; 12 February 1959 – 31 July 2023) was an Azerbaijani military officer and politician who served as Prime Minister after ousting Azerbaijan President Abulfaz Elchibey in the 1993 Azerbaijan military coup.

Huseynov, who had enriched himself through Soviet Azerbaijan's black market, commanded forces on the northern front in the First Nagorno-Karabakh War. He took the rank of colonel and used his money to attract forces under his command. Huseynov had no military training and had no military successes during the war. Azerbaijan President Abulfaz Elchibey removed Huseynov from command, which prompted Huseynov to order his forces to withdraw from the front line and enabled Armenian forces to take Kelbejer.

In June 1993, Huseynov's forces seized the weaponry left by a departing Russian airborne division in Ganja. He subsequently marched on Baku, demanding the resignation of Elchibey and the entire Azerbaijan government. Elchibey declined to call his supporters into the streets to confront Huseynov's army, as he feared that this would embroil Azerbaijan into a conflict akin to the then ongoing Georgian Civil War. Elchibey opted instead to resign. Heydar Aliyev was subsequently installed as president and he in turn installed Huseynov as prime minister. Amid this turmoil, Azerbaijan lost enormous swaths of territory to Armenia in the Nagorno-Karabakh conflict and had effectively lost the First Nagorno-Karabakh War.

Huseynov was later imprisoned.

== Prior to the war ==
After serving in the army in 1977–1979 and later graduating from the Leninabad Technological Institute, Surat Huseynov worked as a plumber, a warehouse employee and an assistant operator at the Kirovabad Textile Factory. In 1983–1984 he resided in Novopavlovsk, Russian SFSR. For the next two years he worked as a wool sorter at a storing department in Shaki, Azerbaijan.

In 1986 he became senior inspector of a textile factory in Yevlakh and was promoted to manager just before the war. He was considered one of key figures in Soviet Azerbaijan's black market and was known for having funded the sovereigntist Popular Front of Azerbaijan in the late Soviet era. He was married and had two children.

== First Nagorno-Karabakh War ==
At the dawn of the conflict in 1990, Huseynov formed an armed group supported by the local Soviet Ground Forces division. He has been reported to have originated the group in Yevlakh. In the summer of 1992, his detachment took part in the Azerbaijani offensive which led to the capture of Mardakert on 4 July 1992. Two days prior to that President Abulfaz Elchibey appointed Huseynov his official representative in Nagorno-Karabakh and the neighbouring regions. In winter 1992–1993, when at the time Azerbaijani Minister of Defence Rahim Gaziyev ordered troops out of Haterk (a village near Mardakert), Huseynov relocated his detachments to Ganja and refused to disband them. As a result, Mardakert fell to Armenians in February 1993. Elchibey responded by removing Huseynov from the government.

During this period, Huseynov received extensive support from the leadership of the 104th Guards Airborne Division of the Soviet Airborne Troops headquartered in Ganja. This was due not only to the good personal relationship between them, but also because Huseynov was pro-Russian and did not conceal his feelings. At the end of May 1993 the last sub-units of the 104th Division left Azerbaijan, eventually to be relocated to Ulyanovsk in Russia, but handed over all their arms and military equipment to Huseynov.

== Ganja revolt ==
The Popular Front of Azerbaijan blamed Huseynov for treason and for intentionally ceding the villages around Mardakert to Armenians (allowing their advance into Kalbajar region) to benefit Russian geopolitical interests in the region. After the remaining Soviet turned Russian troops left Ganja on 28 May 1993, President Abulfaz Elchibey initiated a military operation called Tufan aimed at arresting Huseynov and disarming his detachments. Elchibey deployed 4,000 troops led by Minister of Defence Dadash Rzayev, Commander of Internal Forces Fahmin Hajiyev and Attorney General Ikhtiyar Shirinov to Ganja. On 4 June 1993, at 6 o'clock in the morning, the two groups confronted each other, however not only did the Presidential Guard fail to disarm Huseynov, but the latter quickly defeated it. The number of casualties on both sides, as well as among civilians, was 69. Attorney General Ikhtiyar Shirinov among others was taken hostage, while Dadash Rzayev and Fahmin Hajiyev fled Ganja. Surat Huseynov demanded that Ikhtiyar Shirinov signed a warrant for President Elchibey's arrest on grounds of conspiracy, murder, and abuse of power, which was exercised immediately. Within several days Huseynov extended his control onto the neighbouring regions without meeting any opposition and started advancing toward the capital city of Baku. Upon Huseynov's approach on 18 June, Elchibey secretly fled the capital to his native village of Kalaki in Nakhchivan. Heydar Aliyev who had just returned to Baku from Nakhchivan City and was elected Chairman of the Supreme Council of Azerbaijan on 15 June, was subsequently voted to take over presidency in the country. On 27–29 June, Aliyev negotiated with Surat Huseynov, and as a result the latter agreed to stop his advance on the capital city in exchange to becoming Prime Minister of Azerbaijan with extensive authority over the Ministry of National Security of Azerbaijan, Ministry of Defence and Ministry of Internal Affairs. On 30 June, the Supreme Soviet of Azerbaijan elected Huseynov to the requested office.

== Escape, extradition and conviction ==
Surat Huseynov, now Prime Minister, reportedly expressed dissatisfaction with Heydar Aliyev signing the so-called "Contract of the Century" with the international oil consortium AIOC, which allowed Western companies to extract Azerbaijani oil in the Caspian Sea. According to Huseynov, such infringement of Russian interests in the region would not lead to positive outcomes for Azerbaijan. Some saw that as a manifestation of Huseynov's pro-Russian agenda which went back to his active contacts with Russian military commanders in 1990–1993. On 5 October 1994, riot squads reportedly accompanied by Huseynov's units attempted a coup d'état, supported by the military, against Aliyev, which was immediately suppressed. Huseynov fled to Russia.

Negotiations with the Russian government resulted in Huseynov's extradition to Azerbaijan on 26 March 1997, where he was charged with treason and attempted coup, among other crimes. The arrest was performed simultaneously with the signing of the Treaty of Friendship and Cooperation between Azerbaijan and Russia, and a contract by which the Russian oil company LUKoil was to exploit the oil field of Yalama. On 15 February 1999, Surat Huseynov was sentenced to life in prison, the highest form of punishment in Azerbaijan.

== Release and death ==
In 2004, under pressure from the Organization for Security and Co-operation in Europe, President Ilham Aliyev pardoned him. Huseynov was released and later lived a secluded life in the town of Buzovna, near Baku.

On 31 July 2023, Huseynov, who was suffering from stomach and kidney problems, travelled to Istanbul, Turkey on a flight from Moscow, to seek medical treatment. He died from gastrointestinal bleeding upon landing at Istanbul Airport at the age of 64.

Political offices
| Preceded by Panah Huseynov | Prime Minister of Azerbaijan; 1993–1994 | Succeeded by Fuad Guliyev |
