= Hasan Seyidov =

Azerbaijani politician

3rd Prime Minister of Azerbaijan SSR
- In office 22 January 1981 – 27 January 1989
- Preceded by: Georgy Poltavchenko
- Succeeded by: Ayaz Mutallibov

Personal details
- Born: 16 August 1932 Ganja, Azerbaijan SSR, Soviet Union
- Died: 8 December 2004 (aged 72) Baku, Azerbaijan
- Party: Communist Party of the Soviet Union
- Education: Azerbaijan State Oil Academy
- Occupation: Politician

Hasan Seyidov (Azerbaijani: Həsən Neymət oğlu Seyidov; 16 August 1932 – 8 December 2004) was the chairman of the Council of Ministers of the Azerbaijan Soviet Socialist Republic from 22 January 1981 to 27 January 1989.

== See also ==
- Prime Minister of Azerbaijan
