= Daranak =

Village in Gegharkunik, Armenia

Daranak Դարանակ
- Location within Armenia Location within Gegharkunik
- Coordinates: 40°22′01″N 45°34′16″E
- Country: Armenia
- Province: Gegharkunik
- Municipality: Vardenis
- Founded: 1921
- Elevation: 1,976 m (6,483 ft)

Population (2011)
  - Total: 168
- Time zone: UTC+4 (AMT)

Daranak (Armenian: Դարանակ) is a village in the Vardenis Municipality of the Gegharkunik Province of Armenia.

== History ==
The village was founded in 1921 by immigrants from Pambak. In 1988-1989 Armenian refugees from Azerbaijan settled in the village.
