= Alnabat =

- Municipality
- Location within Azerbaijan
- Coordinates: 40°33′15″N 45°40′00″E
- Country: Azerbaijan
- Rayon: Gadabay

Population
  - Total: 1,295
- Time zone: UTC+4 (AZT)

Alnabat (known as Əliismayıllı until 2011) is a village and municipality in the Gadabay Rayon of Azerbaijan. It has a population of 1,295.
