= Novruz Mammadov =

Azerbaijani politician and translator; former Prime Minister of Azerbaijan

- Novruz Məmmədov
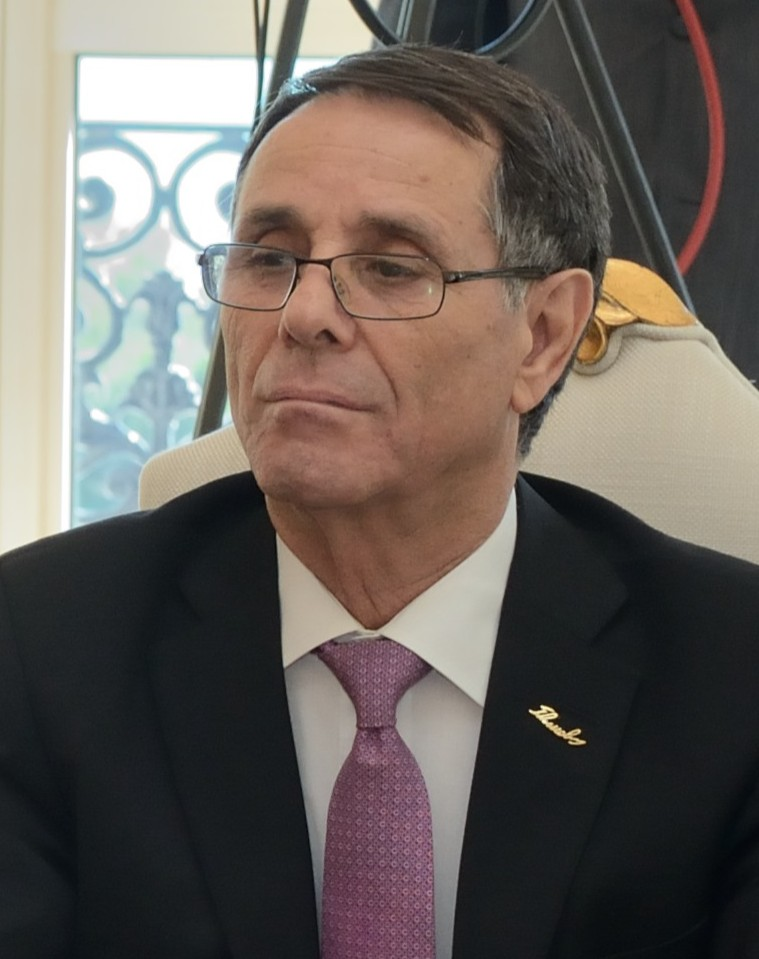
- Mammadov in 2014

9th Prime Minister of Azerbaijan
- In office 21 April 2018 – 8 October 2019
- President: Ilham Aliyev
- Deputy: Yaqub Eyyubov
- Preceded by: Artur Rasizade
- Succeeded by: Ali Asadov

Head of the Foreign Policy Affairs Department of the Presidential Administration
- In office 1997 – 26 November 2018
- President: Ilham Aliyev
- Succeeded by: Hikmet Hajiyev

Personal details
- Born: 15 March 1947 (age 79) Shikhmakhmud, Nakhchivan District, Nakhchivan, Azerbaijan SSR, Soviet Union
- Party: New Azerbaijan Party
- Education: Azerbaijan University of Languages
- Website: Official website; Personal Twitter

Novruz Ismayil oglu Mammadov (Azerbaijani: Novruz İsmayıl oğlu Məmmədov; born 15 March 1947) is an Azerbaijani politician and translator who served as Prime Minister of Azerbaijan from April 2018 to October 2019. He previously held the title as assistant to the President for Foreign Policy Issues and Head of Department of Foreign Policy.

== Early life ==
He was born in Nakhchivan, in the Azerbaijan Soviet Socialist Republic. He received a PhD in Philology in 1991 from the Azerbaijani Pedagogical Foreign Languages Institute (APFLI) of the Azerbaijan University of Languages, where he then became an instructor.

In addition to Azerbaijani, he is also fluent in Russian, and French.

== Career ==
Between 1967 and 1981, he served as an interpreter in Algeria, and in Guinea. In 1992, he became the official dean of the preparatory faculty of APFLI and in 1993, became the dean of French language of APFLI, holding this position until 1997. In 1995, he became the interpreter to former Azerbaijani President Heydar Aliyev. From 1997 to 2018, he was Head of the Department of Foreign Relations of the Presidential Administration of Azerbaijan. On April 21, 2018 he was appointed as the Prime Minister of Azerbaijan by President Ilham Aliyev and left office on October 8, 2019.

== Awards ==
=== Azerbaijan ===
- Shohrat Order (2007)
- Sharaf Order (2017)
- Rank of Ambassador extraordinary and plenipotentiary (2002)

=== Foreign Awards ===
- Legion d’Honneur (France, 1998)
- Polish Legion of Honor (Poland, 2009)
- Order of Legion d’Honneur (France, 2019)

== Publications ==
Novruz Mammadov authored over 20 scientific articles and several books, including more than 300 articles dedicated to the political and public-political issues

He translated “A Myth of Terror” by Erich Feigl" into Russian in 2000 and French in 2001.

Political offices
Preceded by Artur Rasizade	Prime Minister of Azerbaijan; 2018–2019	Succeeded by Ali Asadov
