= Artur Rasizade =

6th Prime Minister of Azerbaijan

- Artur Rasizadə
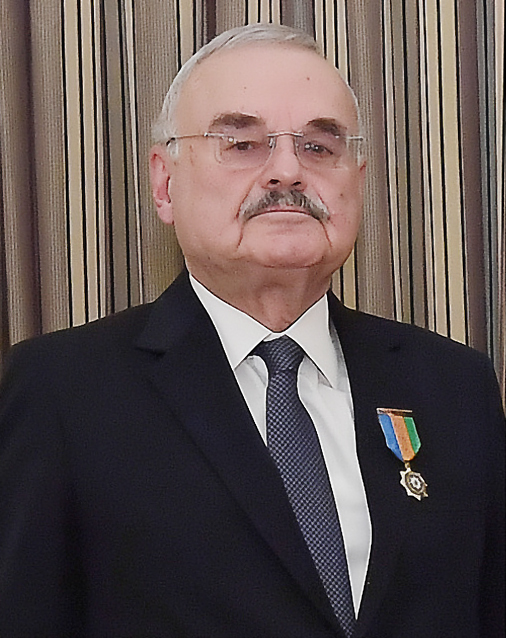
- Rasizade in 2020

6th & 8th Prime Minister of Azerbaijan
- In office 31 October 2003 – 21 April 2018; Acting: 6 August 2003 – 4 November 2003 (for Ilham Aliyev to 31 October 2003)
- President: Ilham Aliyev
- Deputy: Yaqub Eyyubov
- Preceded by: Ilham Aliyev
- Succeeded by: Novruz Mammadov
- In office 20 July 1996 – 4 August 2003; Acting: 20 July 1996 – 26 November 1996 and 18 October 1998 – 24 October 1998
- President: Heydar Aliyev
- Preceded by: Fuad Guliyev
- Succeeded by: Ilham Aliyev

Personal details
- Born: 26 February 1935 (age 91) Ganja, Azerbaijan SSR, Soviet Union (now Ganja, Azerbaijan)
- Party: Communist Party of the Soviet Union (until 1991); New Azerbaijan Party
- Children: 1 (a daughter)

Artur Tahir oghlu Rasizade (Azerbaijani: Artur Tahir oğlu Rasizadə; born 26 February 1935) is an Azerbaijani politician who served as the Prime Minister of Azerbaijan from 1996 until 2018 under the authoritarian regimes of Heydar Aliyev and his son Ilham Aliyev. Thomas de Waal writes of Rasizade's tenure that he "had no political influence", "was unknown outside the country" and his "departure barely merited any commentary."

Rasizade was a long-time Communist Party member during the Azerbaijan SSR period.

== Early life and education ==
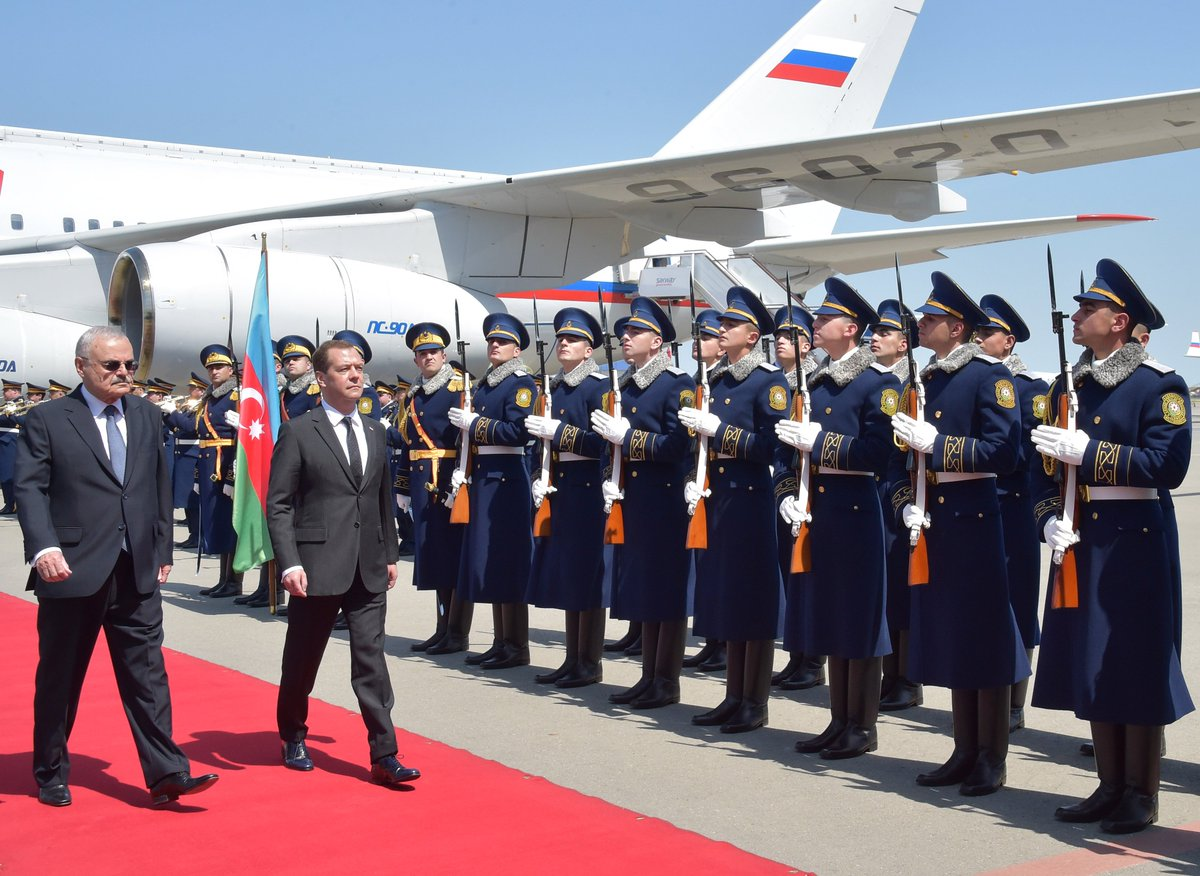
Rasizade with Dmitry Medvedev.

Artur Rasizade was born on 26 February 1935 in Kirovabad (now Ganja) in a teacher's family. His father Tair Mamed Oglou Rasizade was killed during World War II in 1942. In 1952, Artur Rasizade graduated from the Secondary school № 4 (Lankaran), and in 1957 he finished his studies at Azerbaijan State Oil and Industry University. After his graduation, he started working as engineer in Azerbaijani institute of oil mechanical engineering. In 1973, Rasizade became a scientific vice-principal of this institute.

== Career in energy ==
In 1975, he was appointed as senior principal engineer of the State Oil Company of the Azerbaijan Republic (SOCAR). In 1977, he became a director of the Azerbaijani institute of oil mechanical engineering. From 1978 to 1981, he worked as vice-chairman of the State Planning Committee of the Azerbaijan SSR. From 1981 to 1986, he was a chief of the Department of Mechanical Engineering of the Azerbaijan Central Committee. From 1986 to 1992, he was the first vice-chairman of the Council of Ministers of the Azerbaijan SSR, supervising energy, mechanical engineering, defense, oil and chemical industries. From 1992 to 1996, he was a council of the Economic Development Fund.

== In government ==
From February 1996 he worked as an assistant of the president of Azerbaijan, Heydar Aliyev; then, on 3 May 1996, he was appointed as the first deputy prime minister of Azerbaijan. On 20 July 1996, he became acting prime minister of Azerbaijan, and on 26 November 1996 he was appointed as prime minister. On 4 August 2003, he was relieved of his post to make way for Aliyev's son Ilham and was instead appointed as first deputy prime minister. However, on 4 November 2003 he resumed his post of prime minister after Ilham took office as president. He served for 15 years as prime minister before he was replaced in April 2018 by Novruz Mammadov.

== Prime minister ==
He was officially prime minister from 26 November 1996 until 18 October 1998 and from 24 October 1998 until 4 August 2003, when he resigned, ostensibly for health reasons, enabling President Heydar Aliyev's son Ilham Aliyev to assume the office for less than three months. Rasizade continued to act as prime minister for Ilham Aliyev, however, and he formally returned to the post on 4 November 2003, after Ilham Aliyev was elected as President of Azerbaijan. He was succeeded in the position by Novruz Mammadov on 21 April 2018. As first deputy prime minister, Rasizade had been acting prime minister from 20 July 1996 until formally assuming the post on 26 November of that year. Furthermore, as acting first deputy prime minister, Rasizade held the same role from 31 October 2003, when Ilham Aliyev vacated the post to take up the presidency, until Aliyev had him formally re-appointed to the post on 4 November 2003. Finally, Rasizade had been acting prime minister for six days in October 1998, between his own two formal terms of office.

With a total tenure in office of 21 years and 187 days, Rasizade is by far Azerbaijan's longest-serving prime minister.

== Awards ==
On 28 June 2006, Rasizade was awarded with Istiglal Order (Azerbaijani: Istiqlal ordeni) for his contributions to economic development of Azerbaijan by President Ilham Aliyev .

On 25 February 2015, Rasizade was given Shohrat Order (Azerbaijani: Şöhrət ordeni) for his special contributions to economic, scientific, social and cultural development.

Among others, Rasizade was awarded with Sharaf Order (Azerbaijani: Şərəf ordeni) – Order of Glory; Order of National Cohesion; National Order of the Legion of Honour (French: Ordre national de la Légion d'honneur).

In 1971, he was a winner of the USSR State Prize (Russian: Госуда́рственная пре́мия СССР).

He was awarded "Order for service to the Fatherland" 1st Class on 27 February 2020.

On 20 February 2025, Rasizade was awarded with the Heydar Aliyev Order, the highest order of Azerbaijan.

Political offices
Preceded by Fuad Guliyev	Prime Minister of Azerbaijan; 1996–2003	Succeeded by Ilham Aliyev
Preceded by Ilham Aliyev	Prime Minister of Azerbaijan; 2003–2018	Succeeded by Novruz Mammadov
