= Western Caspian University =

Private university in Baku, Azerbaijan

- Qərbi Kaspi Universiteti
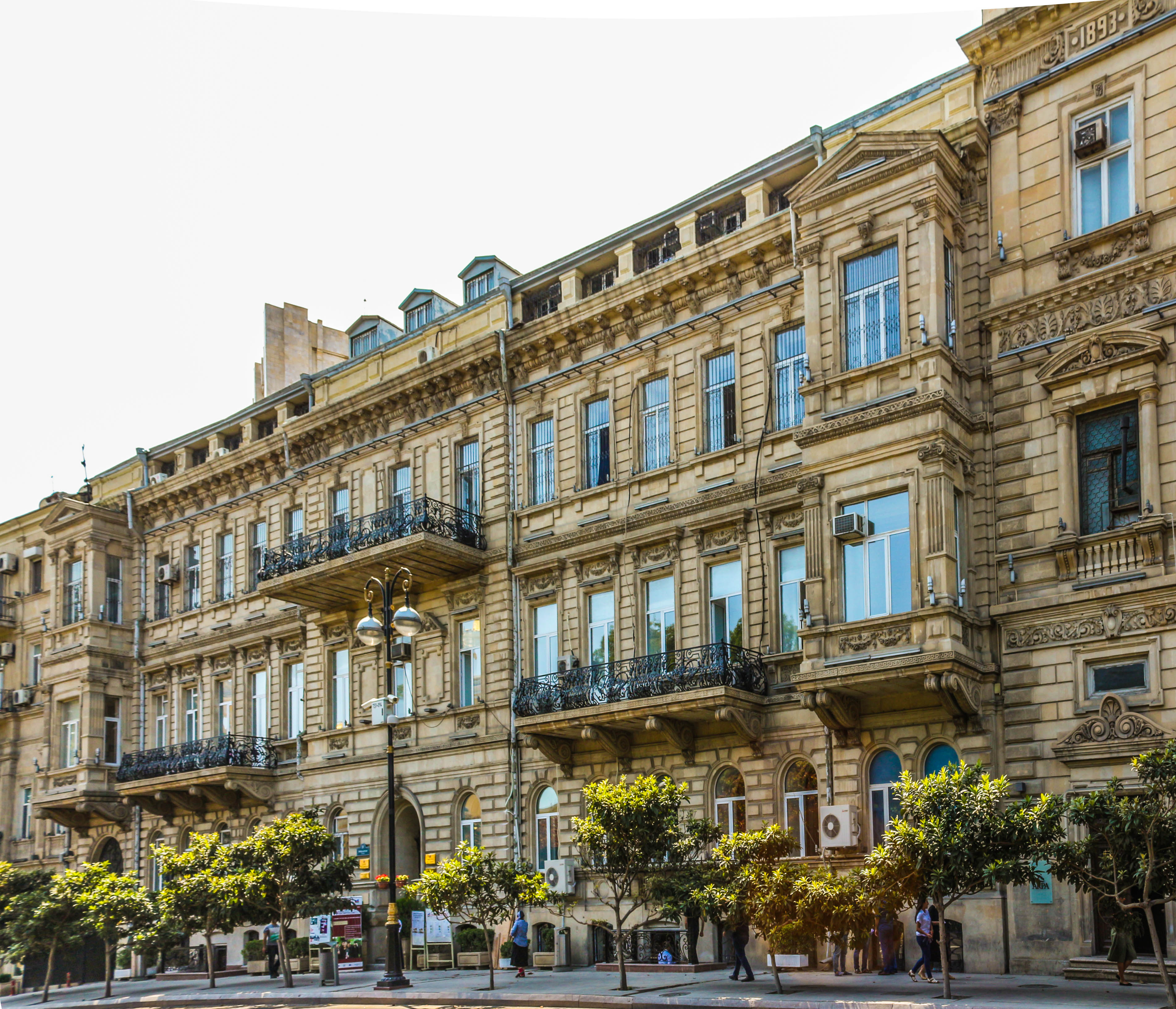
- Type: Private
- Established: 1991
- Rector: Andris Leitas
- Faculty: 180
- Students: 1500
- Location: Baku, Azerbaijan
- Campus: Urban
- Website: www.wu.edu.az

Western Caspian University (Azerbaijani: Qərbi Kaspi Universiteti) is a private university in Baku, Azerbaijan. Founded in 1991 by Husein Baghirov, it has six schools, 25 majors, 180 faculty and approximately 1500 students. The university took its name because it is modeled after Western universities in style of teaching and values, the latter in response to some of the corrupt practices under the Soviet system. Much of the teaching is conducted in English.

In the late 1990s, the school partnered with American universities, such as Indiana University, to help set up its programs in business and law. Many of its partnerships were formed through the now defunct United States Information Agency. Currently, the school has ties with Indiana University, University of Kansas, Mississippi Valley State University, University of North Alabama and Delta State University.

== History ==
=== Foundation ===
Founded in 1991, Western Caspian University is one of the first private higher education institutions established in Azerbaijan. The university became a member of several significant institutions, including the United Nations Educational, Scientific and Cultural Organization – UNESCO (1992); the European Development Fund (EDF) (the European Centre for Development Policy Management – ECDPM) (1996); The Black Sea Universities Network (BSUN, 1999); The International Institute of Administrative Sciences (IIAS, 2000), and The European Association for Tourism and Leisure Education (ATLAS). Western Caspian University maintains close co-operation with many authoritative international educational institutions.

The founding of this institution was influenced by the socio-political and economic processes passing in Eastern Europe and the CIS area after the collapse of the USSR in 1991.

== Organization and administration ==
=== Schools, faculties and departments ===
Western Caspian University offers programs at bachelor, master and PhD levels.

==== The School of High Technologies and Innovative Engineering ====
The School of High Technologies and Innovative Engineering was founded in 1991, entitled "The School of Mathematics and Computer Technologies.”

During its activity, the school trained specialists in Information Science and Computer Engineering, IT and Systems Engineering, as well as Computer Engineering and Information Technology specialists. In 2017, the department was renamed as The School of High Technologies and Innovative Engineering. Presently, the following specialisations are available at the school:

==== The School of Architecture and Design ====
The School of Architecture and Design was established in 2017 at Western University. This school was founded under the auspices of the Design Department that had functioned since 1996. The following specialisations are available at the school for Bachelor, Master, PhD and doctoral studies

==== School of Economics ====
Activities in this field have been conducted since the first day of Western Caspian University. Various specialisations are available at the school – such as “Economy”, “Finance and Accounting”, “Management” and “Consumer Goods and Expertise in Marketing”.

==== Department of Philology and Translation ====
This department has been entitled as the Department of Western Languages since 1996. Students are trained in philology (English language and philology) and translation (English, German, French). Since 2017, the department has continued its activity as the School of Philology and Translation.

The main direction of the department is training philologists, including translators of business, management, political studies, sociology and law.

In general, nine languages are taught at the school: Azerbaijani, English, German, French, Russian, Latin, Chinese, Spanish and Finnish. Foreign specialists – native speakers – are available to improve students’ language skills.

==== School of Political and Public Sciences ====
The Department of Political Sciences had been the training, science and administrative division at Western University since day one. It led training at bachelor's and master's degree levels in the fields of Political Studies, Psychology, Regional Studies, International Journalism, International Relations and so on.

=== International programs ===
Along with local specialists, the university regularly invites specialists from the United States, the United Kingdom, Canada, Netherlands and other countries, to deliver training and lectures.

Short and long-term education projects internationally create opportunities for participation in education programs abroad. Presently, within the Erasmus+ and Movlana Exchange projects, students of the university study at the leading universities of the Czech Republic, Poland, Latvia, Romania, Turkey and Ireland. Western University realizes double diploma projects jointly with Coventry University, Great Britain and London School of Business & Finance in Singapore and the University of business and International Studies (UBIS) in Switzerland.

Today, Western University's international network embraces more than 200 world authoritative education institutions. International cooperative and bilateral activities include bachelor and master's courses, articulation and development agreements, the Erasmus+ and Movlana Exchange projects and others.

== Academic profile ==
=== Scientific research institutes ===
The university regularly encourages scientific research. Two research institutes under the university – Continuous Human Development Institute, and Landscape Research Institute carry out scientific research.

=== Laboratories and centres ===
Western Caspian University is provided with modern, progressive laboratories and research centres.

Physics and Electronics Laboratory – creates an opportunity for students to carry out fundamental scientific calculations, extend and enhance their knowledge and application of the fundamentals of electronics and the laws of physics. The main aim of laboratory research is to facilitate understanding of the importance of knowledge in physics through real experiments carried out by appropriate instruments and equipment, as well as to make students aware of the necessary methods and means to carry out research in physics.

The Geomathic Centre is a unique centre at the university. The establishment of the centre aims to provide students with necessary software and technical skills for gathering information on Geoscience. Such laboratories were initially created in the late 20th century, as there was a great demand for geoinformation. Meeting increasing demands for geographic information is possible only through integration of new technological opportunities for conducting traditional field-research activities. Geomathic centres ensure such kind of integration; they play a key role in conducting scientific-research activities in geographic information systems, distance space-air research, geodesy and mapping, photogrammetry, environment protection.

The university's Centre of Information Technologies is provided with equipment and computers. There is a 3D printer at the centre. Students are able to print items prepared in various formats.

The Science and Innovation Centre successfully implemented several projects in application of scientific and educational innovations.

The mission of the Confucius Centre at Western Caspian University is the promotion of Chinese language and Culture, as well as the development of cultural relations between China and Azerbaijan.

The Language Centre created at Western Caspian University aims to introduce fundamental changes in the teaching and learning process of foreign languages. Conceptually, it has the following format:

- to research difficulties and problems in teaching foreign languages;
- to realize programs in relations to learning foreign languages abroad at the university;
- to establish business relations with leading world language centres, in order to acquire language teaching practice.

=== Library ===
The library at Western Caspian University is the richest library in the country. It has more than 60 000 books, more than 500 microforms and other sources of information. More than 16 000 books is available in English.

This library is the first and only library in the Republic to work in correlation with the UN Library.

The UN Library, established in 2016, continues the process of enriching the library fund with various publications of international institutions. The Depositary Library of the UN World Tourism Organization (UNWTO) was established at the university. And Western Caspian University was the first Azerbaijani University whose name was included in the library program.

The UN Convention to Combat Desertification, the UN Economic and Social Commission for Asia and the Pacific (ESCAP), the UN Population Fund (UNFPA), Secretary of the Intergovernmental Panel on Climate Change – joint international body of the World Meteorological Organization (WMO) and UN Environment Programme (UNEP) adopted a decision to present their publications to the Western Caspian University Library. The publications of these international organizations are regularly received by the library.

At the same time, Western Caspian University joined the Depository Library of The World Intellectual Property Organization (WIPO). Within this program, the WIPO sends publications to the University twice a year.

=== Museum of Thor Heyerdahl ===
The centre has been officially opened during the Thor Heyerdahl Film Festival week, on May 12–20, 2014. It is dedicated to the commemoration of his 100 anniversary.

The museum, which is permanently located on the second floor of the main building of Western Caspian University, contains archive materials related to his activity. It includes documentary films, articles, books about his expeditions, memoirs, handwritten postcards and images from his great journeys, including photos from his visit to Azerbaijan.

The following books about Thor Heyerdal have been translated into the Azerbaijani language by Western Caspian University:

1) The Kon-Tiki Expedition
2) The Ra Expeditions
3) Exploration series I-IX

== Student life ==
=== Student Youth Organization ===
Student Youth Organization (SYO) confirmed its efficiency as a democratic student self-governing body system and creator of close relationships between the university administration and students. The SYO acts within the following responsibilities:

- Conducting surveys among students, exploring their view-points and wishes;
- preparing and introducing comments and proposals on specific problems of students’ life;
- protecting the students’ rights and interests (including social interests);
- introducing proposals on elimination of negative effects on the quality of the teaching process and causes of legal violation.

== Notable alumni ==
- Nargiz Gurbanova, PhD, Ambassador Extraordinary and Plenipotentiary of the Republic of Azerbaijan to the Republic of Bulgaria

== Western Caspian University’s High School ==
Western Caspian University High School, established in 2003, applies the up-to-date methods and curriculum standards.

In addition to the complete secondary education tailored to the high international standards, special emphasis is given to foreign languages – English, French and German. The tuition process applies a variety of interactive and technologically advanced learning tools. Conversation classes with foreign experts create favorable conditions for advanced language learning.

== The Training Centre at Western Caspian University ==
The Western Knowledge Training Centre at Western Caspian University runs academic preparatory classes that are conducted by highly qualified specialists and include:

- Preparing students to begin University tuition
- Training masters
- Preparing to pursue a civil service career
- Foreign language courses
- Preparing to study abroad
- Languages courses abroad
