= Prime Minister of Azerbaijan =

Head of government

Prime Minister of Republic of Azerbaijan
- Azərbaycan Respublikasının Baş naziri
- Emblem of Azerbaijan

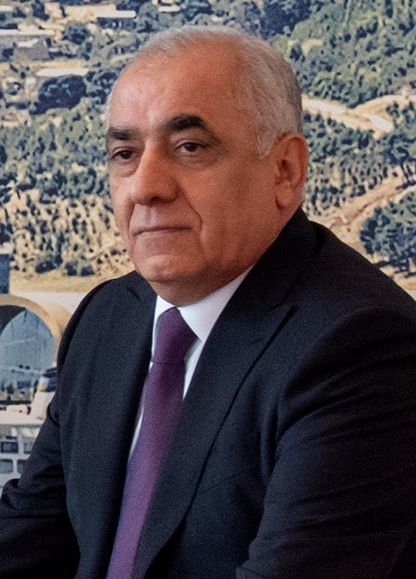
- Incumbent; Ali Asadov since 8 October 2019
- Member of: Cabinet; Security Council
- Appointer: President
- Inaugural holder: Fatali Khan Khoyski
- Formation: 28 May 1918; 7 February 1991
- Deputy: First Deputy Prime Minister; Deputy Prime Ministers
- Salary: ₼11,070 monthly
- Website: The Cabinet of Ministers of Azerbaijan

The Prime Minister of the Republic of Azerbaijan (Azerbaijani: Azərbaycan Respublikasının Baş naziri) is the head of government of Azerbaijan. The current prime minister is Ali Asadov on 8 October 2019 following the removal of Novruz Mammadov.

Due to the central role of the president in the political system, the activities of the executive branch (including the prime minister) are significantly influenced by the head of state (for example, it is the president who appoints and dismisses the Prime Minister and other members of the Government; the president may chair the meetings of the cabinet and give obligatory orders to the prime minister and other members of the Government, the president may also revoke any act of the Government).

== Historical background ==
In the era of the Soviet Union, the head of government was the chairman of Council of People's Commissars (until 1946) and the chairman of the Council of Ministers (after 1946). People who held those positions are sometimes referred to as the prime ministers. They may have also been referred to as Premier of Ministers, or simply premier.

== Succession of the presidency ==
The prime minister is the third-highest constitutional office in Azerbaijan. In the event of the president's death, resignation or impeachment, the prime minister is second in the line of succession, after the first vice-president. Until September 2016, when the office of First Vice-President was created, the prime minister was first in line.

== List of heads of government of Azerbaijan (1918–present) ==
Colour key
(for political parties)
None
Musavat
Military
Communist Party of the Soviet Union (Bolsheviks)
Communist Party of the Soviet Union
New Azerbaijan Party
Azerbaijani Popular Front Party

=== Azerbaijan Democratic Republic (1918–1920) ===
Prime ministers

No.	Name		Term of office			Political party	Government	Elected	Ref
No.	Portrait	Name	Took office	Left office	Days	Political party	Government	Elected	Ref
1		Fatali Khan Khoyski; Azerbaijani: Fətəli-xan Xoyski (1875–1920)	28 May 1918	14 April 1919	321	Independent	1. Rasulzade I	1918	
1		Fatali Khan Khoyski; Azerbaijani: Fətəli-xan Xoyski (1875–1920)	Won the Battle of Baku; removed the Centrocaspian Dictatorship from power in Baku; established a multi-party system; established of postal system of Azerbaijan; founded Azerbaijani manat; established Azerbaijani language in all schools and colleges.						
2		Nasib Yusifbeyli; Azerbaijani: Nəsib Yusifbəyli (1881–1920)	28 May 1919	30 March 1920	307	Musavat	2. Topchubashov I	1919	
2		Nasib Yusifbeyli; Azerbaijani: Nəsib Yusifbəyli (1881–1920)	Established diplomatic ties between Azerbaijan Democratic Republic and Western world.						
—		Mammad Hasan Hajinski (acting); Azerbaijani: Məmməd Hacınski (1875–1931)	30 March 1920	28 April 1920	29	Musavat	—	1920	
—		Mammad Hasan Hajinski (acting); Azerbaijani: Məmməd Hacınski (1875–1931)	Failed to slow down the advance of 11th Red Army on Azerbaijan Democratic Republic.						

=== Transcaucasian Socialist Federative Soviet Republic (1922–1936) and Azerbaijan Soviet Socialist Republic (1936–1991) ===
Chairmen of the Council of People's Commissars

No.	Name		Term of office			Political party	Government	Elected	Ref
No.	Portrait	Name	Took office	Left office	Days	Political party	Government	Elected	Ref
1		Nariman Narimanov; Azerbaijani: Nəriman Nərimanov (1870–1925)	28 April 1920	6 May 1922	738	Communist (Bolsheviks)	1. Hüseynov I	—	
1		Nariman Narimanov; Azerbaijani: Nəriman Nərimanov (1870–1925)	Tried to promote anticolonial program leading to native rule than to a means for the dominance of an industrial proletariat, which refused by Kremlin.						
2		Gazanfar Musabekov; Azerbaijani: Qəzənfər Musabəyov (1888–1938)	6 May 1922	14 March 1930	2869	Communist	2. Kirov I	—	
2		Gazanfar Musabekov; Azerbaijani: Qəzənfər Musabəyov (1888–1938)	During the Great Purge, he was arrested, accused of plotting against the Soviet state, sentenced to death and executed.						
3		Dadash Bunyadzade; Azerbaijani: Dadaş Bünyadzadə (1888–1938)	14 March 1930	23 October 1932	954	Communist	3. Polonski I	—	
3		Dadash Bunyadzade; Azerbaijani: Dadaş Bünyadzadə (1888–1938)	During the Great Purge, he was arrested, accused of plotting against the Soviet state, sentenced to death and executed.						
4		Mir Jafar Baghirov; Azerbaijani: Mir Cəfər Bağırov (1896–1956)	23 October 1932	12 December 1933	415	Communist	4. Polonski I	—	
4		Mir Jafar Baghirov; Azerbaijani: Mir Cəfər Bağırov (1896–1956)	Followed Stalin's orders without question; Purged Azerbaijani intelligentsia, communist leaders who had sympathized with the opposition or who might have once leaned toward Pan-Turkism.						
5		Huseyn Rahmanov; Azerbaijani: Hüseyn Rəhmanov (1902–1937)	12 December 1933	22 August 1937	1349	Communist	5. Bağırov I	—	
5		Huseyn Rahmanov; Azerbaijani: Hüseyn Rəhmanov (1902–1937)	During the Great Purge, he was arrested, accused of plotting against the Soviet state, sentenced to death and executed.						
6		Teymur Guliyev; Azerbaijani: Teymur Quliyev (1888–1965)	13 November 1937	28 March 1946	3057	Communist	6. Bağırov I	—	
6		Teymur Guliyev; Azerbaijani: Teymur Quliyev (1888–1965)	Followed Mir Jafar Baghirov's orders without question; Purged Azerbaijani intelligentsia, communist leaders who had sympathized with the opposition or who might have once leaned toward Pan-Turkism.						

Chairmen of the Council of Ministers

No.	Name		Term of office			Political party	Government	Elected	Ref
No.	Portrait	Name	Took office	Left office	Days	Political party	Government	Elected	Ref
1		Teymur Guliyev; Azerbaijani: Teymur Quliyev (1888–1965)	28 March 1946	18 April 1953	2578	Communist	1. Bağırov I	—	
1		Teymur Guliyev; Azerbaijani: Teymur Quliyev (1888–1965)	—						
2		Mir Jafar Baghirov; Azerbaijani: Mir Cəfər Bağırov (1896–1956)	18 April 1953	17 August 1953	121	Communist	2. Yaqubov I	—	
2		Mir Jafar Baghirov; Azerbaijani: Mir Cəfər Bağırov (1896–1956)	Followed Stalin's orders without question; Purged Azerbaijani intelligentsia, communist leaders who had sympathized with the opposition or who might have once leaned toward Pan-Turkism.						
3		Teymur Guliyev; Azerbaijani: Teymur Quliyev (1888–1965)	17 August 1953	9 March 1954	204	Communist	3. Yaqubov I	—	
3		Teymur Guliyev; Azerbaijani: Teymur Quliyev (1888–1965)	Expelled from Communist Party of Azerbaijan for gross violations of social legitimacy and actively promoting crimes of Mir Jafar Baghirov.						
4		Sadig Rahimov; Azerbaijani: Sadıq Rəhimov (1914–1975)	9 March 1954	8 July 1958	1590	Communist	4. Mustafayev I	—	
4		Sadig Rahimov; Azerbaijani: Sadıq Rəhimov (1914–1975)	Restored Azerbaijani language as the official language of the Azerbaijan SSR.						
5		Vali Akhundov; Azerbaijani: Vəli Axundov (1916–1986)	8 July 1958	10 July 1959	1828	Communist	5. Mustafayev I	—	
5		Vali Akhundov; Azerbaijani: Vəli Axundov (1916–1986)	—						
6		Mamed Iskenderov; Azerbaijani: Məmmed İskenderov (1915–1985)	10 July 1959	29 December 1961	903	Communist	6. Axundov I	—	
6		Mamed Iskenderov; Azerbaijani: Məmmed İskenderov (1915–1985)	—						
7		Enver Alikhanov; Azerbaijani: Ənvər Əlixanov (1917–1992)	29 December 1961	10 April 1970	3024	Communist	7. Axundov I	—	
7		Enver Alikhanov; Azerbaijani: Ənvər Əlixanov (1917–1992)	—						
8		Ali Ibrahimov; Azerbaijani: Əli İbrahimov (1913–1990)	10 April 1970	22 January 1981	3920	Communist	8. H.Əliyev I	—	
8		Ali Ibrahimov; Azerbaijani: Əli İbrahimov (1913–1990)	Temporarily improved economic conditions and promoted alternative industries to the declining oil industry.						
9		Hasan Seyidov; Azerbaijani: Həsən Seyidov (1932–2004)	22 January 1981	27 January 1989	2927	Communist	9. H.Əliyev I	—	
9		Hasan Seyidov; Azerbaijani: Həsən Seyidov (1932–2004)	—						
10		Ayaz Mutallibov; Azerbaijani: Ayaz Mütəllibov (1938–2022)	27 January 1989	26 January 1990	364	Communist	10. Vəzirov I	—	
10		Ayaz Mutallibov; Azerbaijani: Ayaz Mütəllibov (1938–2022)	Black January.						
11		Hasan Hasanov; Azerbaijani: Həsən Həsənov (1940–)	26 January 1990	5 February 1991	375	Communist	11. Mütəllibov I	—	
11		Hasan Hasanov; Azerbaijani: Həsən Həsənov (1940–)	—						

=== Republic of Azerbaijan (1991–present) ===
Prime ministers

No.	Name		Term of office			Political party	Government	Elected	Ref
No.	Portrait	Name	Took office	Left office	Days	Political party	Government	Elected	Ref
1		Hasan Hasanov; Azerbaijani: Həsən Həsənov (1940–)	5 February 1991	4 April 1992	424	Independent	1. Mütəllibov I	—	
1		Hasan Hasanov; Azerbaijani: Həsən Həsənov (1940–)	Made a deal with the Popular Front of Azerbaijan inviting them to form a coalition within the newly established government.						
—		Firuz Mustafayev; Azerbaijani: Firuz Mustafayev (1933–2018)	4 April 1992	16 May 1992	42	Independent	—	—	
—		Firuz Mustafayev; Azerbaijani: Firuz Mustafayev (1933–2018)	Acting Prime Minister.						
2		Rahim Huseynov; Azerbaijani: Rəhim Hüseynov (1936–2023)	16 May 1992	30 January 1993	259	Independent	1. Mütəllibov I	—	
2		Rahim Huseynov; Azerbaijani: Rəhim Hüseynov (1936–2023)	During his term in office, Gross national product fell by 20%.						
—		Ali Masimli; Azerbaijani: Əli Məsimli (1953–)	5 February 1993	28 April 1993	82	Azerbaijani Popular Front Party	1. Elçibəy I	—	
—		Ali Masimli; Azerbaijani: Əli Məsimli (1953–)	Acting Prime Minister. Authored the Azerbaijan Economic Progress Program and Main policies of Cabinet of Ministers program; Laid the foundation of Azerbaijan's Economic Independence Concepts and Agricultural Reforms Program; Established the Assistance Fund for Refugees and IDPs.						
3		Panah Huseyn; Azerbaijani: Pənah Hüseyn (1957–)	28 April 1993	30 June 1993	63	Azerbaijani Popular Front Party	3. Elçibəy I	—	
3		Panah Huseyn; Azerbaijani: Pənah Hüseyn (1957–)	—						
4		Surat Huseynov; Azerbaijani: Surət Hüseynov (1959–2023)	30 June 1993	7 October 1994	464	Military	4. H.Əliyev II	—	
4		Surat Huseynov; Azerbaijani: Surət Hüseynov (1959–2023)	Attempted a coup d'état, supported by the military, against Heydar Aliyev, which was immediately suppressed.						
5		Fuad Guliyev; Azerbaijani: Fuad Quliyev (1941–)	7 October 1994	20 July 1996	652	New Azerbaijan Party	5. H.Əliyev II	—	
5		Fuad Guliyev; Azerbaijani: Fuad Quliyev (1941–)	Acting Prime Minister until 2 May 1995. Declared Sumgait a free economic zone and signed a contract with foreign oil companies for exploration, development and production at Karabakh oil field.						
6		Artur Rasizade; Azerbaijani: Artur Rasi-zadə (1935–)	20 July 1996	4 August 2003	2571	New Azerbaijan Party	6. H.Əliyev II	—	
6		Artur Rasizade; Azerbaijani: Artur Rasi-zadə (1935–)	Acting Prime Minister as First Deputy Prime Minister until 26 November 1996. Acting Prime Minister from 18 to 21 October 1998.						
7		Ilham Aliyev; Azerbaijani: İlham Əliyev (1961–)	4 August 2003	31 October 2003	88	New Azerbaijan Party	7. H.Əliyev II	—	
7		Ilham Aliyev; Azerbaijani: İlham Əliyev (1961–)	—						
8		Artur Rasizade; Azerbaijani: Artur Rasi-zadə (1935–)	31 October 2003	21 April 2018	5286	New Azerbaijan Party	8. İ.Əliyev I	—	
8		Artur Rasizade; Azerbaijani: Artur Rasi-zadə (1935–)	Acting for Prime Minister Ilham Aliyev from 6 August 2003 to 31 October 2003, when Aliyev took office as President of Azerbaijan. Acting Prime Minister as First Deputy Prime Minister from 31 October 2003 until 4 November 2003, when he was named Prime Minister.						
9		Novruz Mammadov; Azerbaijani: Novruz Məmmədov (1947–)	21 April 2018	8 October 2019	535	New Azerbaijan Party	9. İ.Əliyev III	—	
9		Novruz Mammadov; Azerbaijani: Novruz Məmmədov (1947–)	—						
10		Ali Asadov; Azerbaijani: Əli Əsədov (1956–)	8 October 2019	Incumbent	2567	New Azerbaijan Party	9. İ.Əliyev III	—	
10		Ali Asadov; Azerbaijani: Əli Əsədov (1956–)	—						

== See also ==
- Prime Minister of the Nakhchivan Autonomous Republic
- President of Azerbaijan
- List of heads of state of Azerbaijan
- Ministry of Defense of Azerbaijan
