= Ali Asadov =

Prime Minister of Azerbaijan since 2019

- Əli Əsədov
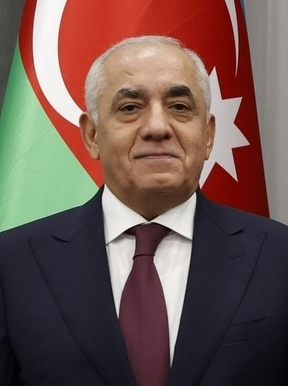
- Asadov in 2022

10th Prime Minister of Azerbaijan
- Incumbent
- Assumed office 8 October 2019; Acting: 14 – 16 February 2024
- President: Ilham Aliyev
- Preceded by: Novruz Mammadov

Member of the National Assembly
- In office 24 November 1995 – 12 November 2000

Personal details
- Born: 30 November 1956 (age 69) Baku, Azerbaijan SSR, Soviet Union (now Baku, Azerbaijan)
- Party: New Azerbaijan Party
- Spouse: Zamira Asadova
- Children: 2

Ali Hidayat oghlu Asadov (Azerbaijani: Əli Hidayət oğlu Əsədov; born 30 November 1956) is an Azerbaijani politician serving as the Prime Minister of Azerbaijan following his appointment to the post on 8 October 2019 by president Ilham Aliyev.

== Early life ==
Ali Asadov was born on 30 November 1956 in Baku. In 1974 he graduated from secondary school No.134 in Baku, and entered the Plekhanov Russian University of Economics in Moscow, from which he graduated in 1978. He served in the Soviet Army from 1978 to 1980.

In 1980, he began working as a chief laboratory assistant at the Institute of Economics of the Academy of Sciences of the Azerbaijan SSR. Asadov continued his education at the Institute of Economics of the USSR Academy of Sciences in Moscow between 1981 and 1984, where he got his post-graduate diploma in Economics.

In 1989–1995, Ali Asadov worked as an associate Professor and head of the department at the Baku Institute of Social Management and Political Science.

== Career ==
Asadov with Ukrainian president Volodymyr Zelenskyy during Zelensky's first visit to Azerbaijan as a president

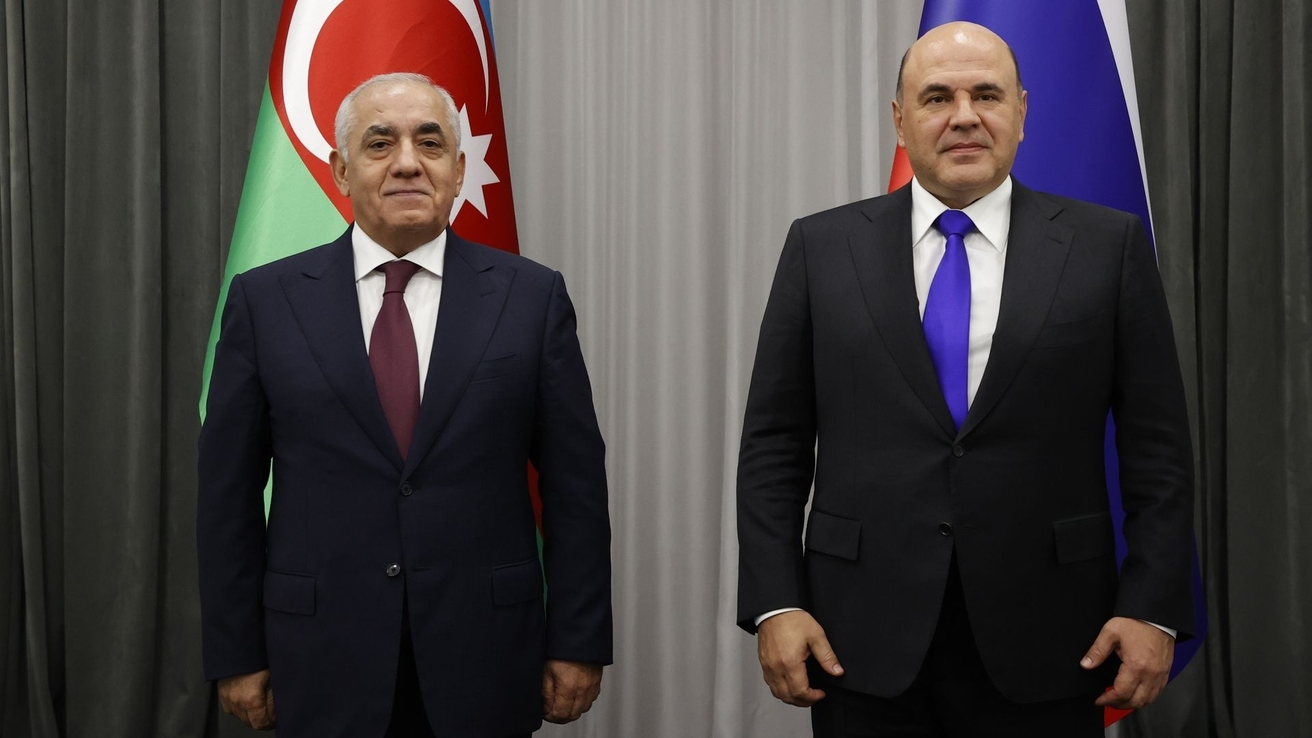
Asadov with Russian Prime Minister Mikhail Mishustin on 25 August 2022

In the first Azerbaijan parliamentary election held on 12 November 1995, Ali Asadov was elected an MP by proportional representation for the term of 1995–2000, representing the New Azerbaijan Party.

On 17 April 1998, he was appointed assistant of the Azerbaijani President for economic affairs. According to the decree of the President Ilham Aliyev dated 30 November 2012, Asadov was appointed as the deputy head of the Presidential Administration; in 2017, he was appointed an assistant of the President of Azerbaijan for economic affairs. Asadov has been considered a close ally of President Aliyev. In October 2019, following Novruz Mammadov's resignation, he was elected Prime Minister by a vote of 105 to 0. He heads the 8th Government of Azerbaijan.

== Awards ==
- Order “For Service to the Motherland” of the second degree (2012)
- Order “For Service to the Motherland” of the first degree (2016)

Political offices
Preceded by Novruz Mammadov	Prime Minister of Azerbaijan; 2019–present	Incumbent
