= Azerbaijan State Oil and Industry University =

State-owned university in Baku, Azerbaijan

Coordinates: 40.3785°N 49.8485°E

Azerbaijan State Oil and Industrial University
- Azərbaycan Dövlət Neft və Sənaye Universiteti (ADNSU)
- Former name: Azerbaijan State Oil Academy
- Type: Public
- Established: 1920
- Rector: Rufat Azizov
- Academic staff: 850
- Administrative staff: 900
- Students: 10,200
- Undergraduates: 9,050
- Postgraduates: 1,050
- Doctoral students: 100
- Location: Baku, Azerbaijan
- Campus: Urban
- Transportation: Metro: Line 1 28 May metro station Line 2 Jafar Jabbarly metro station Bus №: 1, 4, 5, 14, 21, 32, 46, 88, 88A, 120, 125, 127, 175, AirPort Express
- Website: asoiu.edu.az

University rankings

Global – Overall
- QS World: 851-900 (2026)

Regional – Overall
- QS Emerging Europe and Central Asia: 401-450 (2022)

Azerbaijan State Oil and Industrial University (formerly Azerbaijan State Oil Academy) (Azerbaijani: Azərbaycan Dövlət Neft və Sənaye Universiteti) is a tertiary education institution in Baku, Azerbaijan.

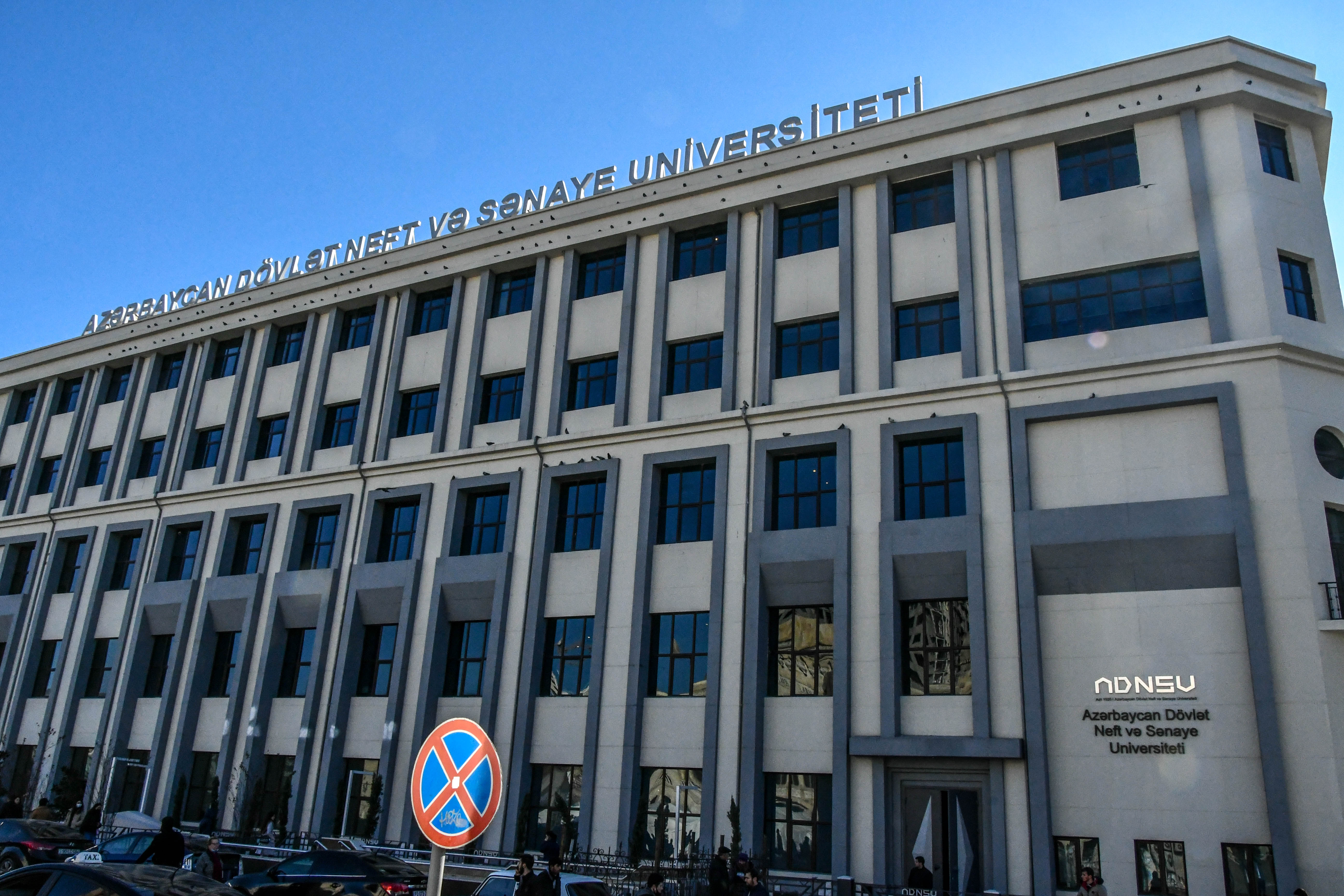
Azerbaijan State University of Oil and Industry

== History ==
The rise of what became ASOIU is tied to the rise of the petroleum industry in the Baku region. By 1887 the preparatory technical school that would become Baku Polytechnicum was established in Baku. By 1910 it had integrated a curriculum related to the growing oil industry. However, the ratio of Azerbaijanis to non-Azerbaijanis was so skewed that, of the 494 students studying at the school in 1916, only 20 were Azeri. On November 14, 1920, after the invasion of the Red Army and the establishment of the fledgling Azerbaijan SSR, the new government decreed that Baku Polytechnicum would close and be replaced by Baku Polytechnical Institute, a more traditional polytechnic institute and the beginnings of the current incarnation. The new school focused on training engineers in a broad range of industries, from agriculture to oil. By 1923, the school graduated its first three students; by 1927, it had risen to 289 graduates.

The new school went through many name changes over the years as its emphasis changed to meet the needs of Azerbaijan. In 1923, the school changed its name to Azerbaijan Polytechnical Institute. In 1929, the agriculture department was spun off into a separate Agriculture Institute and the university changed its name to the Azerbaijan Oil Institute (AOI) in 1930. However, the expanding need for engineers in areas outside oil resulted in an expansion in the school's curriculum. The school changed names again in 1934, this time to the Azerbaijan Industrial Institute (Az.I.I.).

World War II taxed the Soviet Union and schools like Az.I.I. struggled to stay open. At the end of the war, there was great demand for oil engineers in the Soviet Union and the school trained them in great numbers. In 1952, the government founded a separate Azerbaijan Polytechnical Institute and moved much of the non-petrochemical curricula to the new school so that Az.I.I. could focus on the oil industry. On February 12, 1959, the school was renamed the Azerbaijan Oil and Chemistry Institute (AzOCI). In the early 1960s, an evening program was developed. This program developed into its own, separate public university in 1992, reusing the name Azerbaijan Industrial Institute and becoming Sumgait State University. On March 21, 1992, after the independence of Azerbaijan from the Soviet Union, the university changed its name to the current ASOIU.

In 1993, the school changed its curricula into a more Western model, with its first bachelor's and master's degree candidates graduating in 1999.

By the decree of the president, the university was named the Azerbaijan State Oil and Industrial University in 2015.

=== Shooting spree ===
On April 30, 2009, a shooting spree occurred at the academy in which thirteen people were killed. The perpetrator was Farda Gadirov, a Georgian citizen of Azerbaijani descent.

== Campus ==
The campus is on Azadlıq Prospekti (Liberty Avenue) in Baku.

== Organization and administration ==
The university is run by a management body of prorectors, supervised by the Scientific Council and the rector Rufat Azizov.

== Academic profile ==
The Academy has eight faculties – Geology and Exploration Faculty, Gas, Petroleum and Mining Faculty, Chemical Technologies Faculty, Petro-mechanics Faculty, Energetics Faculty, Automatization of Production Processes Faculty, Engineering Economics, International Economic Relationships and Management Faculty and the Institute for Specialization and Re-education of Workforce for Industrial Organizations.

Since the breakup of the Soviet Union, ASOA has worked with a dozen Western universities to Westernize and modernize its programs, in particular with Georgia State University to develop a modern Master of Business Administration program.

ASOA trains students in more than 50 fields: geological engineering, computer sciences, metallurgical engineering, hydrogeology engineering, geophysics engineering, mountain-mining engineering, petroleum and gas construction engineering, heating energetics engineering, equipment production engineering, technology machinery and apparatus engineering, electrical engineering, electronics, communication and radiotechnics engineering, mechatronics and robotechnology engineering, mechanical engineering, information technology and systems engineering, re-manufacturing and repair engineering, metrology, standardization and certification engineering, chemical engineering, petroleum and gas engineering, automatization engineering, management, engineering economics, marketing and so on.

== Awards ==
In 1931, the university received “Order of the Red Banner of Labor of the Azerbaijan SSR” and in 1940, it received “Order of the Red Banner of Labor”.

== Student life ==
The Academy has its own sports complex with swimming pool, tennis courts and all-weather football pitch. The "Neftçi" (~"Oilers") run teams in 12 sports including football, swimming, handball, basketball, athletics, judo, boxing and wrestling.

== Notable alumni ==
=== Presidents ===
- Heydar Aliyev, President of Azerbaijan from June 1993 to October 2003
- José Eduardo dos Santos, President of Angola from September 1979 to September 2017

=== Ministers ===
- Abdulla Bayramov, Former Minister
- Abdulla Qadirov, Former Minister
- Ajdar Aliyev, Former Minister
- Alexander Yakovlev, Former Deputy Minister
- Ali Hasanov, Former Deputy Prime Minister
- Ali Karimov, Former Minister
- Alibala Asadullayev, Former Minister
- Alirza Bayramzade, Former Minister
- Alish Mustafayev, Former Minister
- Anvar Alikhanov, Former Minister
- Anvar Gasimzade, Former Minister
- Anvar Ismayilov, Former Deputy Minister
- Babken Sarkisov, Former Minister
- Elchin Zeynalov, Deputy Minister
- Elmir Velizade, Former Deputy Minister
- Farah Shakinskaya, Former Deputy Minister
- Farid Musabeyov, Former Minister
- Fuad Guliyev, Former Prime Minister
- Georgi Sheglov, Former Minister
- Gulmammad Javadov, Former Deputy Minister
- Gurban Khalilov, Former Minister
- Habib Fataliyev, Former Minister
- Huseyn Iskandarov, Former Minister
- Irada Eyyubova, Minister
- Kamil Akimov, Former Minister
- Majid Karimov, Former Minister
- Mammad Alizadeh, Former Minister
- Mammadaga Mammadov, Former Minister
- Mammadjavad Gasimzadeh, Former Deputy Minister
- Namig Nasrullayev, Former Minister
- Namigkamal Aliyev, Former Minister
- Nariman Isayev, Former Minister
- Nasrulla Nasrullayev, Former Minister
- Natig Aliyev, Former Minister
- Parviz Shahbazov, Minister of Energy of Azerbaijan Republic
- Pavel Galonsky, Former Deputy Minister
- Rustam Ismayilov, Former Minister
- Sadig Rahimov, Former Minister
- Sahib Alakbarov, Deputy Minister
- Suleyman Vezirov, Former Minister
- Tahira Tahirova, Former Minister
- Vasily Dinkov, Former Minister
- Yaver Jamalov, Former Minister
- Yuri Zaytsev, Former Deputy Minister
- Zuleikha Huseynova, Former Minister

=== Parliamentarians ===
- Adil Sadigov, Former Parliamentarian
- Aghagurban Aliyev, Former Parliamentarian
- Ahad Yagubov, Former Parliamentarian
- Alexander Maluntsev, Former Parliamentarian
- Alovsat Abdulrahimov, Former Parliamentarian
- Aslan Abbasov, Former Parliamentarian
- Astan Shahverdiyev, Former Parliamentarian
- Bayrak Konstantin, Former Parliamentarian
- Ekrem Shakinski, Former Parliamentarian
- Fazil Muradaliyev, Former Parliamentarian
- Firudin Aliyev, Former Parliamentarian
- Fuad Muradov, Parliamentarian
- Gurban Abbasov, Former Parliamentarian
- Hajibaba Efendiyev, Former Parliamentarian
- Heydar Isayev, Former Parliamentarian
- Hilal Asadov, Former Parliamentarian
- Israfil Huseynov, Former Parliamentarian
- Jamaletdin Magomayev, Former Parliamentarian
- Javad Gasimov, Parliamentarian
- Kamran Huseynov, Former Parliamentarian
- Karim Ramazanov, Former Parliamentarian
- Khasay Vezirov, Former Parliamentarian
- Mammad Isgandarov, Former Parliamentarian
- Mashhur Mammadov, Parliamentarian
- Mazhahir Abdullayev, Former Parliamentarian
- Midhad Abbasov, Former Parliamentarian
- Musa Aliyev, Former Parliamentarian
- Muslim Imanov, Former Parliamentarian
- Naim Fataliyev, Former Parliamentarian
- Namig Akhundov, Former Parliamentarian
- Natig Sadigzadeh, Former Parliamentarian
- Rafiga Gaziyeva, Former Parliamentarian
- Rasim Musabeyov, Parliamentarian
- Rauf Aliyev, Former Parliamentarian
- Rza Hasanaliyev, Former Parliamentarian
- Saleh Gojayev, Former Parliamentarian
- Tofig Aliyev, Former Parliamentarian
- Togrul Shahtakhtinsky, Former Parliamentarian
- Vagif Akhundov, Former Parliamentarian
- Valeh Alasgarov, Parliamentarian
- Vugar Rahimzade, Former Parliamentarian
- Zuleikha Seyidmammadova, Former Parliamentarian

=== Founders ===
- Zarangiz Huseynova, Founder, CEO, Serial entrepreneur, Forbes under 30

=== Others ===
- Abulfaz Babayev, Chairman
- Abuzar Aliyev, Former Rector
- Akbar Aliyev, Former Chairman
- Ali Ibrahimov, Former Chairman
- Arzu Javadova, Vice-President (SOCAR)
- Ayaz Mutallibov, Former President
- Aziz Azizov, Head of the Executive Power
- Bahram Huseynov, Former Vice-President (SOCAR)
- Balabala Rzayev, President of Organization
- Cavid Abdullayev, Director of Azerbaijan Renewable Energy Agency under the Ministry of Energy of the Republic of Azerbaijan
- Ceyhun Salmanov, Deputy Chairman of the State Agency for Public Service and Social Innovations under the President of the Republic of Azerbaijan
- Dashgin Iskenderov, Advisor to the President of the State Oil Company of the Republic of Azerbaijan
- David Mammadov, Former Vice-President (SOCAR)
- Elchin Khalilov, President of Organization
- Elkhan Bashirov, (General manager of UBOC)
- Elviz Ismayilov , Vice-rector for science and innovation (ASOIU)
- Hasan Zeynalov, Former Ambassador
- Hijan Sharifov, Chairman
- Huseyn Guliyev, Ambassador
- Ibrahim Guliyev, Former Vice-President of Organization
- Ismayil Ibrahimov, Former Vice-President of Organization
- Ismayil Ismayilov, Former Education Advisor of the Republic of Azerbaijan in the Republic of Turkey
- Ismat Mehraliyeva, Head of the Digital Trade Hub
- Khalik Mammadov, Former Vice-President (SOCAR)
- Malik Isakov, Head of the Executive Power
- Mirza Bagirov, Former Rector
- Murad Mahmudov, Former Rector
- Mushfig Atakishiyev, Former Rector
- Nazim Muradov, Scientist who received Oscar for Inventions
- Nigar Adilova, Vice-rector for international relations (ASOIU)
- Rafiga Huseynzade, Former Vice-President (SOCAR)
- Rafik Aliev, President of Lotfi Zadeh Legacy and Artificial Intelligence Association
- Rafiq Guliyev, Head of the Executive Power
- Rahman Gurbanov, Former Vice-President (SOCAR)
- Ramiz Gurbanov, Former Rector
- Sabit Bagirov, Former President of Organization
- Seymur Necefov, Vice-rector for finance and operations
- Shafayat Mehdiyev, Former Rector
- Shamil Azizbeyov, Former Vice-President of Organization
- Tatyana Zatulovskaya, Two-time Olympic chess champion
- Teyyub Jabbarov, Deputy Director
- Tofig Gahramanov, Former Vice-President (SOCAR)
- Vahid Akhundov, State Advisor on Economic Policy Issues
- Vali Israfilov, Olympic Champion
- Victor Gutirya, Former Vice-President of Organization
- Vũ An, CEO of Petrovietnam Chemical and services Corporation
- Zakir Babayev, Director
- Zaman Novruz, Former Vice-President of Organization
- Zaur Huseynov, Former Chairman
- Eyyub Tağıyev, Professor, laureate of the Stalin State Prize.
- Bəxtiyar Məmmədov, Chairman
- Arif Həşimov, President of Azerbaijan National Academy of Sciences
- Musa Rüstəmov, Azerbaijani scientist, Doctor of Technical Sciences, Head of the Department of Oil and Gas Chemistry and Technology
- Telman Əliyev, Doctor of Technical Sciences, Professor, Academician
- Rəşid Cavanşir, Doctor of Geology and Mineralogy, Professor
- Vagit Alekperov, President of the Russian oil company LUKOIL
- Nikolai Baibakov, head of Gosplan (State Committee for Planning) of the USSR
- Lavrentiy Beria, chief of the Soviet security and secret police apparatus under Joseph Stalin
- Rustam Ibrahimbeyov, screenwriter
- Kerim Kerimov
- Alish Lambaranski, ex-mayor of Baku
- Asya Manafova, politician and diplomat
- Izzet Orujova
- Sabit Orujov, minister of the gas industry of the USSR
- Elmira Ramazanova (1934–2020), geologist and petroleum engineer
- Artur Rasizade, Prime Minister of Azerbaijan
- Farman Salmanov, geologist
- Fazila Samadova, academic, chemical engineer-technologist
- Vitaly Zholobov, Soviet cosmonaut who flew on Soyuz 21
- Tofig Aghahuseynov, Commander of the Baku Air Defense District
- Suren Arzumanov, Soviet oil and mechanical engineer, designer of the first drilling rigs in the USSR.

=== Faculty ===
- Elmira Ramazanova (1934–2020), geologist and petroleum engineer
- Chingiz Khalifa-zade, geologist and professor
- Izzet Orujova

== Affiliations ==
The academy is a member of the Caucasus University Association.

== International relations ==
ASOIU's international relations are developed in the following areas:

- Preparation of specialists and scientific staff for foreign countries;
- The activity of professor-teacher staff in foreign science and education institutions, education of students, masters and post-graduate students;
- Participation in international educational programs;
- Bilateral cooperation with foreign universities;
- Cooperation with foreign missions in Baku;
- Cooperation with international companies;
- Collaboration with International Associations of Universities.

In 2015, by the presidential decree, the French-Azerbaijan University (UFAZ) was established. The students of this university have an opportunity to get a diploma from the University of Strasbourg.

ASOIU is cooperating with several foreign universities:

- Georgia State University (USA)
- Zigen University (Germany)
- Ploektti Oil and Gas University (Romania)
- Tronheim City Science and Technology University (Norway)
- Russia's State Oil and Gas University (Russia)
- Genuya University (Italy)
- Nitsa Sofia-Antipolis University (France)
- Athens National Technical University (Greece)
- Khazar State University of Technology and Engineering (Kazakhstan)
- The University of Warwick (United Kingdom)

== Foreign cooperation ==
In 2017, “New Educational Trend” conference was held in Baku at the 11th Azerbaijan International Education Festival. During the conference “Memorandum of Understanding” between Azerbaijan State Oil and Industrial University and Poltava National Technical University.

On September 23, 2018, during the 65th anniversary of the China University of Petroleum (CUP), Mustafa Babanli the rector of ASOIU and Zhang Laibin the rector of the CUP signed a memorandum of cooperation in Beijing, China.

ASOIU signed cooperation contract with Inonu University of Turkey in 2018, which involves cooperation with higher educational institutions and organization in Turkey.

During the meeting with Dr. Abdolrahim Navehebrahim who is the chancellor of Kharazmi University of Islamic Republic of Iran, the cooperation contract was signed between universities in 2018.

On January 26, 2018, rector of ASOIU and Ambassador of Turkmenistan to Azerbaijan Mekan Ishanguliyev held a meeting. During the meeting, bilateral cooperation and friendship in educational field were discussed between the parties.

ASOIU have signed cooperation contracts with several foreign universities such as Malakand University (Pakistan), Poltava National Technical University (Ukraine), Northern (Arctic) Federal University (Russia). The university is establishing cooperation with Moscow State University (Russia).

Mir-Babayev M.F. Establishment of the first oil institute in Transcaucasia — «Reservoir», Canada, 2011, Volume 38, Issue 8, September, p. 31-37.
