= Asadov =

Asadov (Azerbaijani: Əsədov; Asadova for females) is a surname of Azerbaijani origin, slavicised from the Arabic male given name Asad and literally means "Assad's".

Notable people with the surname are:

- Adil Asadov, Azerbaijani philosopher
- Ali Asadov (born 1956), Azerbaijani politician
- Arif Asadov (born 1970), Azerbaijani professional football coach and a former player
- Asad Asadov
- Eduard Asadov (1923–2004), Russian poet and writer of Armenian origin
- Elchin Asadov (born 1987), Azerbaijani racing cyclist
- Garay Asadov (1923–1944), Azerbaijani Red Army sergeant
- Heydar Asadov
- Hilal Asadov
- Mahammad Asadov (1941–1991), Azerbaijani politician
- Mirumar Asadov
- Ogtay Asadov (born 1955), Azerbaijani politician
- Rafael Asadov (1952–1992), National Hero of Azerbaijan
- Vasif Asadov (born 1965), Azerbaijani triple jumper
