= Ali Karimov =

Azerbaijani politician

- Əli Kərimov
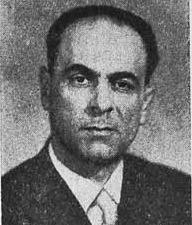
- Ali Karimov, deputy of the Supreme Council of the Azerbaijan SSR

Chairman of the State Labor and Social Affairs Committee
- In office 13 October 1987 – 22 May 1991 (Note: After Azerbaijan SSR was renamed Republic of Azerbaijan on 5 February 1991, Ali Karimov kept his position as Chairman of the State Labor and Social Affairs Committee of the republic)
- Preceded by: Position established
- Succeeded by: Svetlana Gasimova

Chairman of the State Labor Committee
- In office 20 December 1980 – 13 October 1987
- Preceded by: Ziya Kurmakayev
- Succeeded by: Position abolished

First Secretary of the Baku City Committee of the Azerbaijan Communist Party
- In office 7 May 1970 – 22 December 1980
- Preceded by: Abdulla Gadirov
- Succeeded by: Vagif Huseynov

Chairman of the People's Control Committee
- In office 22 December 1965 – 7 May 1970
- Preceded by: Position established
- Succeeded by: Hajibaba Afandiyev

Chairman of the Party-State Control Commission
- In office 27 December 1962 – 22 December 1965
- Preceded by: Position established
- Succeeded by: Position abolished

Deputy Chairman of the Council of Ministers
- In office 4 February 1960 – 22 December 1965
- Premier: Mamed Iskenderov; Anvar Alikhanov

Minister of Internal Affairs
- In office 13 August 1956 – 4 February 1960
- Preceded by: Andrey Bulyga
- Succeeded by: Khalil Mammadov

Personal details
- Born: 20 September 1919 Baku, Baku Governorate, Azerbaijan Democratic Republic
- Died: 4 June 2000 (aged 80) Baku, Azerbaijan
- Resting place: Yasamal cemetery
- Party: CPSU
- Education: Azerbaijan Institute of Industry

Ali Habib oghlu Karimov (Azerbaijani: Əli Həbib oğlu Kərimov; 20 September 1919 – 4 June 2000) was an Azerbaijani politician who held various high-ranking positions in the Azerbaijan SSR. His career included roles such as the Minister of Internal Affairs, the First Secretary of the Baku City Committee of the Azerbaijan Communist Party, and the Chairman of the State Labor Committee of the Azerbaijan SSR.

== Early life and career ==
Ali Habib oghlu Karimov was born in 1919 in Baku to a working class family. After finishing high school in 1937, he studied at the Faculty of Oil Mechanics at the Azerbaijan Institute of Industry. During his studies, he became the secretary of the faculty and later the institute's Komsomol organization. In 1942, he graduated from the institute and in later years, he pursued part-time education at the Higher Party School of the Central Committee of the CPSU.

From 1942, Ali Karimov worked as an inspector at the Dzerzhinsky plant and later as the deputy head of the control department. He also led the factory's Komsomol organization. Following this, he became more involved in Komsomol work and in 1943, was elected secretary of the Komsomol committee of the Orjonikidze district and became a member Communist Party of the Soviet Union. In 1944–1945, he served as the Secretary of the Baku Komsomol committee, and from 1945 to 1947, as the First Secretary.

== Political career ==
In October 1947, Ali Karimov was elected the first secretary of the Central Committee of the Leninist Young Communist League of Azerbaijan. He participated in the congress of the World Federation of Democratic Youth held in Budapest as part of the Soviet delegation. He was also a member of the Central Committee of the Komsomol.

From 1952 to 1956, Ali Karimov served as the head of a department in the Central Committee of the Azerbaijan Communist Party. From 1956 to 1960, he was the Minister of Internal Affairs of the Azerbaijan SSR, and from 1960 to 1965, the Deputy Chairman of the Council of Ministers. During that period, from 1962 to 1965, he was also a Secretary of the Central Committee and the Chairman of the Party-State Control Commission of the Central Committee of the Azerbaijan CP and the Council of Ministers. From 1965 to 1970, he served as the Chairman of the People's Control Committee of the Azerbaijan SSR.

In 1970, Ali Karimov was elected the First Secretary of the Baku City Committee of the Azerbaijan Communist Party and led the city of Baku until 1980. In 1980, he became the Chairman of the State Labor Committee of the Azerbaijan SSR. From 1990 to 1992, he headed the Central Election Commission for People's Deputies Elections of Azerbaijan.

Ali Karimov was a member of the Central Committee of the Azerbaijan Communist Party from 1953 to 1981, being a bureau member from 1962 to 1966 and from 1971 to 1981, and a candidate bureau member from 1966 to 1971. He was elected deputy of the Supreme Soviet of the USSR for five convocations (3rd, 5th, 8th–10th) and deputy of the Supreme Soviet of the Azerbaijan SSR for five convocations (2nd, 4th–7th), as well as a deputy of the Baku City Workers' Deputies Council.

Ali Karimov died on June 5, 2000. He was buried in Yasamal cemetery.
