= Gasham Shahbazov =

Gasham Shahbazov Qəşəm Şahbazov

The First Secretary of the Zangibasar District Committee of the Communist Party of Armenia
- In office 1947–1950
- Preceded by: Huseyn Mammadov

Second Secretary of the Karabakhlar District Committee of the Communist Party of Armenia
- In office 1944–1946

Personal details
- Born: 1902 Garahamzali, Erivan uezd, Erivan Governorate, Russian Empire
- Died: 1989 (aged 86–87) Baku, Azerbaijan SSR, USSR
- Children: Ogtay Shahbazov
- Relatives: Parviz Shahbazov (grandson)

Gasham Jalil oghlu Shahbazov (Azerbaijani: Qəşəm Cəlil oğlu Şahbazov, 1902 — 1989) was an Azerbaijani-Soviet statesman, First Secretary of the Zangibasar District Committee of the Communist Party of Armenia (1947-1950).

== Biography ==
Gasham Shahbazov was born in 1902 in the village of Garahamzali. He received his secondary education in Yerevan, and at the beginning of 1925 he was employed at the Central Committee of the Youth Union of Lenin Komsomol of Armenia. A short time later, he was appointed the organizer responsible for the Nor Bayazet uezd of the Komsomol.

In 1928, Gasham Shahbazov entered the Samad Aghamalioghlu technical school in Baku, then continued his education at the Azerbaijan State Agricultural Institute in Ganja. After returning to Basarkechar district, he worked here as the head of the water department for three years.

In 1938, after becoming a member of the Communist Party of the Soviet Union, Gasham Shahbazov moved to Yerevan, worked as a deputy editor in the "Soviet Armenia" newspaper, and then was sent to the Vedi region as the deputy director of MTS for political affairs. In 1942, he was taken to military service in the ranks of the Red Army, but after a few days he was returned from Tbilisi and appointed to the post of newspaper editor in the Karabakhlar District. In 1944, he was elected the Second Secretary of the Karabakh District Committee of the Communist Party of Armenia, and at the beginning of 1946, he was appointed the head of the department of the Central Committee of the Communist Party of Armenia.

Gasham Shahbazov was elected the First Secretary of the Zangibasar District Committee of the Communist Party of Armenia in 1947 and was the last Azerbaijani to hold this position. In 1950, he was removed from the post of the first secretary of the district in connection with his protest against the deportation of Azerbaijanis from Armenia and was sent to study at the Baku Higher Party School. After completing his education, he was assigned to help with construction works in the city of Sumgait, and after a while, he was appointed the chairman of the "Komsomol" collective farm in Shamkhor District. After working here for 3 years, he returned to Baku and lived here until the end of his life.

Gasham Shahbazov died in 1989.
