= Mammad Khalilov =

Azerbaijani politician

Mammad Khalilov Məmməd Xəlilov

Minister of Agriculture
- In office March 17, 1965 – October 9, 1976
- Premier: Anvar Alikhanov; Ali Ibrahimov
- Preceded by: Asker Orujov (as Minister of Production and Procurement of Agricultural Produce)
- Succeeded by: Mammad Askerov

Minister without portfolio
- In office March 30, 1963 – September 30, 1963
- Premier: Anvar Alikhanov

Chairman of the Association for Sale of Agricultural Equipment and Supplies
- In office March 16, 1961 – March 17, 1965
- Premier: Anvar Alikhanov
- Preceded by: Position established
- Succeeded by: Yevgeny Chegodayev

First Deputy Minister of Agriculture
- In office 1960–1961
- Minister: Mohsun Poladov

Personal details
- Born: September 1917; Elizavetpol, Elizavetpol Governorate
- Died: October 9, 1976 (aged 59); Baku, Azerbaijan SSR, USSR
- Resting place: Alley of Honor
- Political party: CPSU (1958–1976)
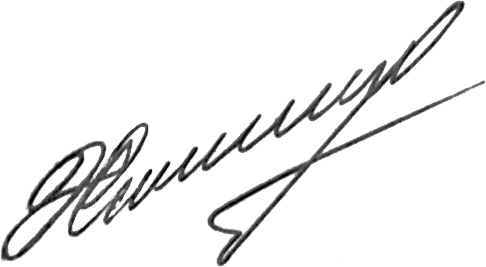
- Signature

Mammad Rza oghlu Khalilov (Azerbaijani: Məmməd Rza oğlu Xəlilov; September 1917 – October 9, 1976) was an Azerbaijani politician who served as the Minister of Agriculture of the Azerbaijan SSR from 1965 to 1976.

== Biography ==
Mammad Khalilov was born in 1917 in present-day Ganja. In 1940, after graduating from the Melitopol Institute of Agriculture Mechanization, he was sent to work at the People's Commissariat of Agriculture of the Azerbaijan SSR.

He served in the Red Army from 1941 and participated in the Great Patriotic War. From 1945 to 1958, he worked as an engineer, head of department in the Ministry of Agriculture of the Azerbaijan SSR, in the Ministry of Cotton Industry, and later as the head of the Machine tractor station and technical repair station main department of the Ministry of Agriculture of the Azerbaijan SSR.

From 1959, he worked as the deputy head of the agricultural department of the Central Committee of the Azerbaijan Communist Party, and in 1960, he was appointed the First Deputy Minister of Agriculture of the Azerbaijan SSR. In 1961–1965, he was the chairman of the Azerbaijan SSR Association for Sale of Agricultural Equipment and Supplies, and from 1965 he served as the Minister of Agriculture of the Azerbaijan SSR.

Mammad Khalilov was a member of the Communist Party of the Soviet Union since 1958 and was elected deputy of the sixth, seventh, eighth and ninth convocations of the Supreme Soviet of the Azerbaijan SSR. In 1963–1964, he was a member of the agricultural bureau of the Central Committee of the Communist Party of Azerbaijan, and from 1965 to the Central Committee. He was awarded three orders of the Red Banner of Labour, as well as Medal "For Battle Merit" and Medal "For Courage" and was given the honorary title "Honored Agricultural Mechanic of the Azerbaijan SSR".

Mammad Khalilov died on October 9, 1976, in Baku. He was buried the Alley of Honor.
