= Rafiga Huseynzade =

Azerbaijani politician and scientist

- Rəfiqə Hüseynzadə
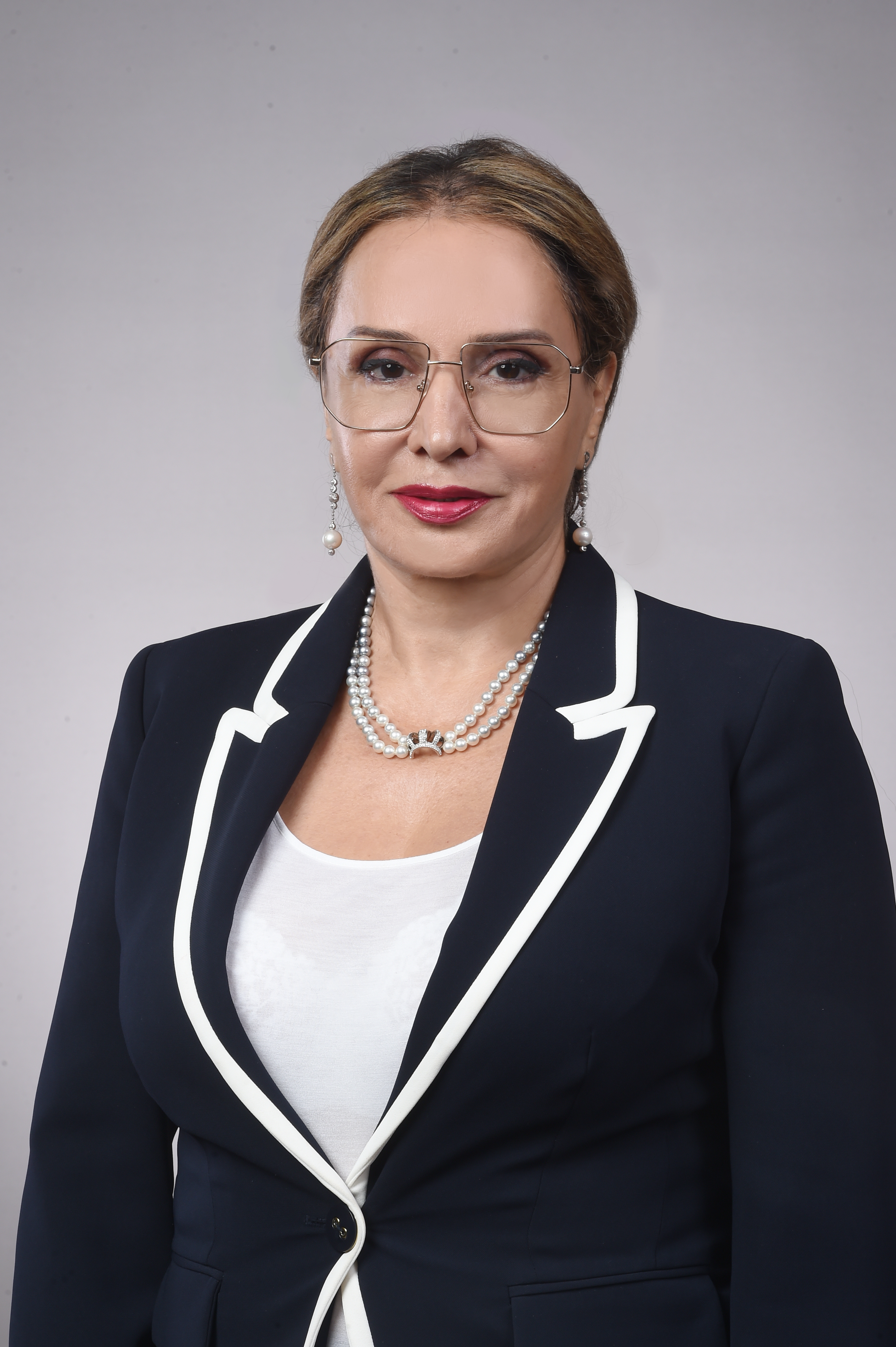
- Born: 1952; Baku, Azerbaijan SSR
- Education: Azerbaijan Oil and Chemistry Institute (PhD)
- Spouse: Chingiz Huseynzade
- Scientific career
- Fields: geologico-mineralogical sciences
- Institutions: Azerbaijan State University, HARC Research Center, Research Center of the companies Geolab and Statoil
- Thesis: Geochemical Characteristics of Oil and Gas Fields in Lower Kuryani (1981)

Rafiga Abdul Agha gizi Huseynzade (Azerbaijani: Rəfiqə Abdul Ağa qızı Hüseynzadə; born 1952) is an Azerbaijani scientist awarded the "Shohrat Order", a Candidate of Geologico-Mineralogical Sciences, and an honorary member of the Azerbaijan Oil Geologists Society (since 2023). She is the chair of the Caspian Environmental Protection Initiative (CEPI) (since 2020) and served as the vice president for ecology at the State Oil Company of Azerbaijan Republic (SOCAR) from 2011 to 2023, becoming SOCAR's first female vice president.

== Personal life ==
Rafiga Huseynzade was born in 1952 in Baku. In 1974, she graduated from the "Oil and Gas Field Exploration and Survey" faculty of the Azerbaijan Oil and Chemistry Institute with a degree in engineering geology. From 1975 to 1985, she was a postgraduate student and researcher at the institute. In 1981, she defended her doctoral dissertation on "Geochemical Characteristics of Oil and Gas Fields in Lower Kuryani" in the field of geologico-mineralogical sciences.

She is married to Chingiz Huseynzade, the vice president of the Azerbaijan National Olympic Committee.

== Academic career ==
Huseynzade worked at the Azerbaijan State University laboratory from 1985 to 1999, holding positions as a scientific researcher, senior scientific researcher, and laboratory director. In 1997, she worked at the HARC Research Center in Houston, USA (invited by Texaco), as well as at the Research Center of the companies Geolab and Statoil, in Trondheim, Norway.

Since 2001, she has continued her scientific work as an associate professor at the "Mineral Resources" department of Baku State University (BSU). She is the author of nearly 70 articles and scientific papers.

Rafiga Huseynzade, together with Kamal Mustafayev, is the inventor of the "system for oil reservoir modeling," which was patented by the Intellectual Property Agency of the Republic of Azerbaijan in 2020. She is also a co-author of four books published by the Senate Publishing House in the UK with Lord David Evans: the first and second editions of "Discover Azerbaijan" (2015 and 2016), the book "Azerbaijan and the United Kingdom 100 Years of Partnership" (2019), and the book "Revival of Karabakh" (2023).

She has organized seven events in the House of Lords in the UK on the topic of "Energy and Environmental Protection Cooperation between Azerbaijan and the United Kingdom."

In 2023, Rafiga Huseynzade was elected an honorary member of the Azerbaijan Oil Geologists Society.

== Career ==
From 1999 to 2011, Huseynzade served as the general director of "Azlab" LLC, a company established by SOCAR. In 2011, she was appointed SOCAR's vice president for ecology by a decree from the president of Azerbaijan, Ilham Aliyev, becoming SOCAR's first female vice president.

As SOCAR's vice president for ecology, Huseynzade led several projects: in 2012, the associated gas collection project at the Neft Daşları and "28 May" oil and gas production facilities; in 2013, a project with BP to collect gas that had been flared for over 20 years at the "Chirag" platform and transfer it to the main gas network; in 2015, a project with BP to build the region's largest Waste Management Center; and starting in 2014, a project to capture 2 billion m³ of associated gas annually for public use, which had previously been flared for over 20 years. From 2015 to 2020, she also led the "Nationally Appropriate Mitigation Actions for low-carbon end-use sectors in Azerbaijan" (NAMA) project, in partnership with the UN Development Program, which captured 7 million m³ of associated gas annually at the "Siyazanneft" facility to prevent deforestation.

As SOCAR's vice president, she served as a member of the steering committee of the World Bank's "Global Gas Flaring Reduction Partnership" (GGFR) and participated in its meetings in London (2016), Paris (2017), and again in London (2020). She also represented SOCAR as a member of the steering committee in meetings on the "Guiding Principles on Reducing Methane Emissions" initiative, created by BP, Eni, Equinor, ExxonMobil, Shell, Total, and Wintershall, held in Paris (2019) and London (2020).

In 2018, she led the "Leak Detection and Repair" (LDAR) project in partnership with Norway's "Carbon Limits" company, which reduced emissions by 21,000 tons of CO_{2} equivalent in SOCAR's operations. The project generated a profit of 3 million euros and was the first project in Azerbaijan to enable the sale of carbon credits.

In 2020, she conceived and became head of the "Caspian Environmental Protection Initiative" (CEPI), a regional organization created in partnership with BP, KazMunayGas, Equinor Absheron AS, and Total E&P Absheron B.V.

Huseynzade led the SOCAR delegation at the COP26 conference held in Glasgow, United Kingdom, from October 31 to November 12, 2021. She was also the only SOCAR representative to present at the "Energy Transition — Toward Carbon Neutrality from Hydrocarbon Fuels and Methane Reduction Measures: Pathways, Challenges, Timelines" session held in Baku during the 8th Southern Gas Corridor Advisory Council Ministerial Meeting on February 4, 2022.

== Awards and honors ==
- Honorary title of "Honored Engineer of the Republic of Azerbaijan" by Presidential Decree of Ilham Aliyev.
- 2012 – the "Taraggi Medal" by Presidential Decree of Ilham Aliyev for services to the development of Azerbaijan's oil industry.
- 2012 – a top award from the World Bank's GGFR organization for the associated gas collection project at the Neft Daşları and "28 May" oil and gas production facilities.
- 2015 – a top award from the World Bank's GGFR organization for reducing gas flaring at the Azeri-Chirag-Gunashli oil field.
- 2016 – award by BP's president Gordon Birrell for effective collaboration on joint environmental projects with BP.
- 2017 – award by BP's president Gary Jones for significantly reducing gas flaring at the Azeri-Chirag-Gunashli oil field.
- 2018 – award by GGFR chair Riccardo Puliti for participation in reducing flared and associated gas in Azerbaijan and successful collaboration with the World Bank's GGFR organization.
- 2018 – "Collaborative Pathfinder Award" from the UK Parliament"s House of Lords for contributions to reducing carbon emissions and protecting the environment.
- 2023 – the "Shohrat Order" by Presidential Decree of Ilham Aliyev for contributions to the development of the oil industry in Azerbaijan.
