= Alikhanov =

Alikhanov (Russian: Алиханов, Azerbaijani: Əlixanov) is a Russian and Azerbaijani surname. Notable people with the surname include:

- Abraham Alikhanov (1904–1970), Soviet Armenian nuclear physicist
- Anton Alikhanov (born 1986), Russian politician and lawyer
- Anvar Alikhanov (1917–1992), Azerbaijani politician
- Maksud Alikhanov
