= Tofig Safaraliyev =

Azerbaijani statesman

Tofig Safaraliyev Tofiq Səfərəliyev

Minister of Industrial Construction of the Azerbaijan SSR
- In office July 13, 1979 – July 19, 1983
- Preceded by: Vasili Pyatibrat
- Succeeded by: Ajdar Aliyev

First Deputy Minister of Industrial Construction of the Azerbaijan SSR
- In office 1975–1979
- Minister: Vasili Pyatibrat

Deputy Minister of Oil Refining and Petrochemical Industry of the Azerbaijan SSR
- In office 1974–1975
- Minister: Kamil Akimov

Personal details
- Born: January 1, 1932
- Died: July 19, 1983 (aged 51)
- Resting place: Alley of Honor
- Party: CPSU
- Education: Azerbaijan Industrial Institute
- Awards: Order of Lenin Order of the Badge of Honour Honored Engineer of the Azerbaijan SSR

Tofig Shamil oghlu Safaraliyev (Azerbaijani: Tofiq Şamil oğlu Səfərəliyev, January 1, 1932 — July 19, 1983) was an Azerbaijani statesman, Minister of Industrial Construction of the Azerbaijan SSR (1979–1983), Deputy of the 10th convocation of the Supreme Soviet of the Azerbaijan SSR.

== Biography ==
Tofig Safaraliyev was born on January 1, 1932. After graduating from the Azerbaijan Industrial Institute in 1954, he worked as an engineer, department head and chief mechanic at Baku refineries. For a number of years he was chief specialist and group leader in the construction of oil refineries in Iraq and Egypt, as well as economic adviser to the USSR embassy in India. From 1962 to 1966 Tofig Safaraliyev headed the Vladimir Ilyich New Baku Oil Refinery.

In 1974, Tofig Safaraliyev was appointed Deputy Minister of Oil Refining and Petrochemical Industry of the Azerbaijan SSR, in 1975 he became the First Deputy Minister of Industrial Construction, and in 1979 he became the Minister of Industrial Construction of the Azerbaijan SSR.

Tofig Safaraliyev was elected a member of the Soviet Communist Party in 1956 and was a deputy of the 10th convocation of the Supreme Soviet of the Azerbaijan SSR. He was elected a member of the Central Committee at the XXX Congress of the Communist Party of Azerbaijan. He was awarded the Order of Lenin and the Badge of Honor, as well as three USSR medals. He was awarded the honorary title of "Honored Engineer of the Azerbaijan SSR".

Tofig Safaraliyev died on July 19, 1983. He was buried in the Alley of Honor on July 21.
