= Ajdar Aliyev =

Azerbaijani politician

Ajdar Aliyev Əjdər Əliyev

Chairman of the State Statistics Committee of the Republic of Azerbaijan
- In office 5 February 1991 – 9 May 1993
- Preceded by: the name of the office changed
- Succeeded by: Arif Valiyev

Chairman of the State Statistics Committee of the Azerbaijan SSR
- In office 26 January 1989 – 5 February 1991
- Preceded by: Khalil Mammadov
- Succeeded by: the name of the office changed

Minister of Construction of the Azerbaijan SSR
- In office 2 December 1986 – 2 January 1989
- Preceded by: himself (as the minister of industrial construction)
- Succeeded by: the office abolished

Minister of Industrial Construction of the Azerbaijan SSR
- In office 24 November 1983 – 2 December 1986
- Preceded by: Tofig Safaraliyev
- Succeeded by: himself (as the minister of construction)

Personal details
- Born: 1937
- Party: CPSU
- Education: Azerbaijan Institute of Oil and Chemistry
- Awards: Order of the Badge of Honour

Ajdar Ajdar oghlu Aliyev (Azerbaijani: Əjdər Əjdər oğlu Əliyev; born 1937) was an Azerbaijani statesman, Chairman of the Azerbaijan State Statistics Committee (1989–1993), Minister of Construction of the Azerbaijan SSR (1986–1989), Minister of Industrial Construction of the Azerbaijan SSR (1983–1986).

== Biography ==
Ajdar Aliyev was born in 1937. He graduated from the Azerbaijan Institute of Oil and Chemistry.

He started his career in 1959 as a technician at the Designing Institute of Azerbaijan State Oil Industry Enterprises ("Azerneftdovlatlayiha"), and became the foreman of the Krasnoyarsk Construction Department of the "Sibtexqurdashdirma" Trust. Then, for seven years, he worked in Sumgayit and Baku (department No. 3) installation departments of the Azerbaijan Petrochemical Installation Trust in various engineering and technical positions, and from 1967 he worked as the deputy head of the Department of Installation and Special Construction Works of the Council of Ministers of the Azerbaijan SSR.

Ajdar Aliyev had been the Deputy Minister of Industrial Construction of Azerbaijan SSR since 1970, Minister of Industrial Construction since 1983, and Minister of Construction since 1986. Since 1989, he had been the chairman of the State Statistics Committee of Azerbaijan.

Ajdar Aliyev had been a member of the CPSU since 1967. Elected deputy of the 11th convocation of the Supreme Soviet of the Azerbaijan SSR. He was awarded the "Badge of Honour" order.
