= Alibala Asadullayev =

Azerbaijani politician

Alibala Asadullayev Əlibala Əsədullayev

Minister of Local Industry
- In office July 29, 1975 – July 4, 1979
- Premier: Ali Ibrahimov
- Preceded by: Ramazan Mammmadli
- Succeeded by: Ayaz Mutallibov

Personal details
- Born: January 1928; Baku, Azerbaijan SSR, USSR
- Died: March 5, 1981 (aged 53)
- Political party: CPSU (1951–1981)
- Education: Azerbaijan Institute of Industry

Alibala Bahram oglu Asadullayev (Azerbaijani: Əlibala Bəhram oğlu Əsədullayev; January 1928 – March 5, 1981) was an Azerbaijani politician who served as Minister of Local Industry of the Azerbaijan SSR from 1975 to 1979.

== Biography ==
Alibala Asadullayev was born in 1928, in Baku. He started his career in 1949 as an engineer-constructor at the "Baku worker" plant. After graduating from the Azerbaijan Institute of Industry in 1950, he was elected the First Secretary of the Lenin District (present-day Sabunchu District) Committee of the Leninist Young Communist League of Azerbaijan.

In 1951–1956, Alibala Asadullayev worked as the head of the technical control department and head of the workshop, then held the position of chief engineer at the plant named after S. M. Kirov. In 1957–1958, he was the director of the plant named after Petrov, and the deputy chief engineer of the Machine-Building Department of the National Economic Council of the Azerbaijan SSR.

From 1959 to 1965, Alibala Asadullayev was the director of the Keshla machine-building plant, the head of the Machine-Building Department of the Azerbaijan SSR, and from November 1965, he was the head of the Azerbaijan Oil Industry Machine-Building Union. In 1973–1975, he worked as the head of the machine-building department in the State Planning Committee of the Azerbaijan SSR. In July 1975, he was appointed the Minister of Local Industry of the Azerbaijan SSR. He served in this position until 1979.

Alibala Asadullayev became a member of the Communist Party of the Soviet Union in 1951, and was elected deputy of the seventh and eighth convocations of the Supreme Soviet of the Azerbaijan SSR. He was a member of the Inspection Commission of the Azerbaijan Communist Party. He was twice awarded the Order of the Red Banner of Labour, as well as other medals of the USSR, and was bestowed the honorary title of "Honored Engineer of the Azerbaijan SSR". Asadullayev was a private pensioner of the Soviet Union.

Alibala Asadullayev died in 1981.
