= Natig Aliyev =

Azerbaijani politician (1947–2017)

- Natiq Əliyev
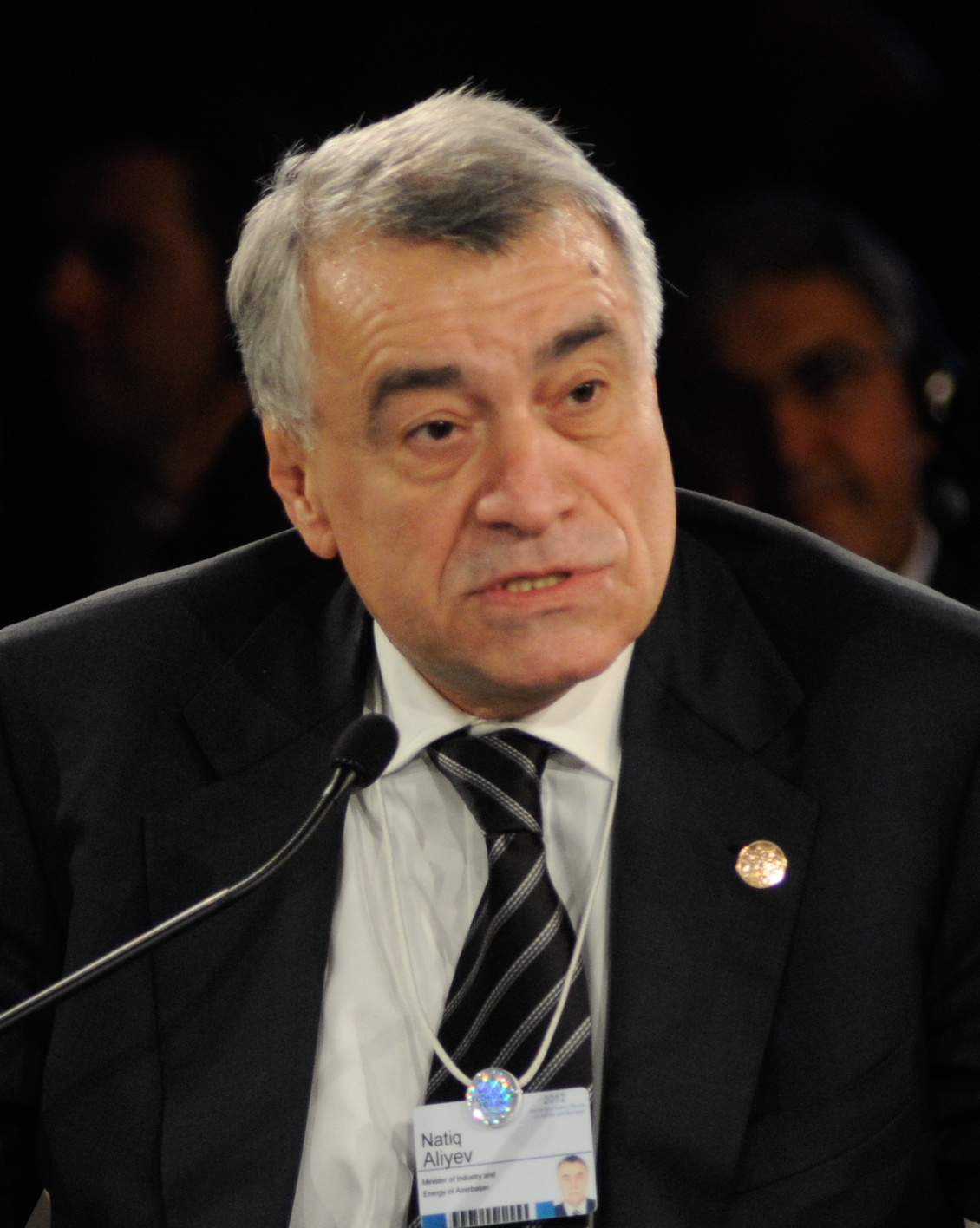
- Aliyev in 2012

Minister of Industry and Energy
- In office December 6, 2004 – June 9, 2017
- President: Ilham Aliyev
- Preceded by: office established
- Succeeded by: Parviz Shahbazov

Personal details
- Born: November 23, 1947 Baku, Azerbaijan SSR, Soviet Union
- Died: June 9, 2017 (aged 69) Istanbul, Turkey

Natiq Aghaami oghlu Aliyev (Azerbaijani: Natiq Ağaəmi oğlu Əliyev; November 23, 1947 – June 9, 2017) was an Azerbaijani politician. He was president of the State Oil Company of Azerbaijan Republic from 1993 to 2004, and Minister of Industry and Energy of Azerbaijan Republic from 2004 until his death in 2017.

== Early life ==
Aliyev was born on November 23, 1947, in Baku, Azerbaijan. He graduated from secondary school in 1965. In 1970, he graduated from Azerbaijan State Oil Academy. He has a PhD in Geology-Mineralogy Sciences. He started working in the field once he was employed by Xəzərdənizneft state concern in 1970. Starting from 1984, Aliyev was appointed the Chief Instructor of Department at the administration of Central Committee of Azerbaijan Communist Party. From 1989 to 1991, he worked as Director of the Economic-Social Issues Department. In 1992, he appointed the Director of Ipesko representative office in Baku. At the same time, he worked as a consultant at SOCAR.

== Political career ==
In 1993, he was appointed the Chairman of Board of Director and President of State Oil Company of Azerbaijan Republic by President Heydar Aliyev. He retained the post of the President until December 6, 2004, when he was appointed the Minister of Industry and Energy of Azerbaijan Republic. Rovnag Abdullayev replaced Aliyev as the head of SOCAR.

== Death ==
Aliyev died on June 9, 2017, at Florence Nightingale Hospital in Istanbul from a heart ailment after suffering a heart attack the week before in Baku.

== Works and awards ==
Aliyev was the Chairman of the State Committee for Development of Azeri-Chirag-Guneshli fields and is the Chairman of the Board of Directors of Baku-Tbilisi-Ceyhan (BTC). In 2008, he was elected a member of the International Engineering Academy in Moscow. Aliyev has been awarded with Shohrat Order due to service in development of oil industry in Azerbaijan Republic. He was also awarded with Order of the Glory of Georgia, Legion d’Honneur of France and Meritted Engineer Medal of Azerbaijan Republic.

== See also ==
- Cabinet of Azerbaijan
