= Suren Arzumanov =

Soviet engineer (1908–1977)

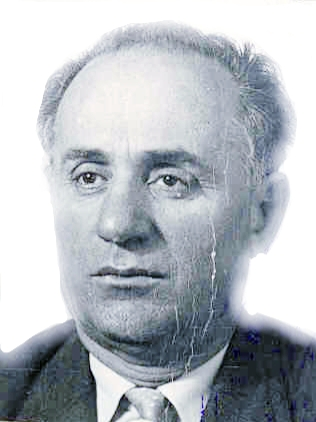

Personal details
- Born: 14 September 1908, Baku, Azerbaijan, Russian Empire
- Died: 26 September 1977, Moscow, USSR
- Spouse: Aida Egiazarova (1911-1964)
- Children: Irena Arzumanova (1943–2021)
- Parents: Akop Arzumanov (1880–1951) (father); Nadejda Arzumanova (1888–1965) (mother)
- Education: Azerbaijan State Oil and Industry University (1925–1931)
- Profession: Oil & Mechanical engineer, designer of drilling and oilfield equipment

Suren Akopovich Arzumanov (Russian: Арзума́нов Суре́н Ако́пович; 14 September 1908 – 26 September 1977) was a Soviet Petroleum and mechanical engineer, designer of the first drilling rigs in the USSR. The Laureate of the USSR State Prize (1949). Honorary Oilman of the USSR (1968).

== Biography ==
Suren Arzumanov was born in 1908 in Baku to a working-class Armenian family. His father Akop Arzumanov (1880–1951) was a turner-mechanic in Baku at the Lieutenant Schmidt mechanical plant of the USSR People's commissariat of Petroleum Industry. Afterwards he worked in the Leninneft Trust as the head of the gas shop. In 1932, for contribution to the oil industry of the Azerbaijan SSR, he was awarded as the Republic Hero of Labor.

In 1931, Suren Arzumanov graduated from the Azerbaijan State Oil and Industry University with a degree in mechanical engineering. While studying, he gained labour experience working in Baku as a technician at the local oil fields of Leninneft and Bukhta Ilicha. The first years of Suren Arzumanov's career coincided with a period when a real technical revolution was underway in the petroleum industry in Azerbaijan. Every year, oil production and refining increased in the republic.

During the years from 1931 to 1933, Suren Arzumanov worked in the Azerbaijan Institute of Oil Engineering as a designer, and later as the head of the sector for the design and creation of the first Soviet drilling rigs. From 1933 to 1942, Arzumanov organised and established the production of drilling and oilfield equipment in Baku.

During World War II when Nazi Germany troops moved towards the Volga River and the Caucasus regions, Suren Arzumanov was the one who was responsible for the disabling of Baku's oil wells. When the front lines moved away from Baku, he actively participated in the restoration of oil production. During these years, the Baku oil fields were the main fuel hub of the USSR.

According to the memoirs of the head of the Soviet Petroleum Industry Nikolai Baibakov, the task of preventing the Nazis from controlling the oil fields was set personally by Soviet Leader Joseph Stalin, who said as follows:

"You need immediately fly to the south. And be into account, if you leave the Nazi even a drop of oil, we will shoot you. But if you destroy the oil fields, but the Nazi do not come, and we are left without fuel, we will shoot you too."

— Joseph Stalin

After the Red Army's victory at the Battle of Stalingrad and the threat of the Baku oil fields occupation by the Nazis had passed, Suren Arzumanov was transferred to Moscow to the People's Commissariat of the Petroleum Industry of the USSR. He was needed to organize the development and updating of the oil field equipment and oil refinery engineering. Since 1945, he managed this direction of work.

In the post-war time, Suren Arzumanov, as a highly qualified engineer and supervisor, organised the work for the radical technical updating the equipment for the oil industry. Under his leadership, new equipment samples were developed and tested. It was charge of serial production and restored the producing of the all types of drilling and oil field equipment, involving the largest machine-building plants of other industries in the USSR. He became the author of many inventions in the area of oil field equipment and mechanical engineering, many of which are still used in modern oil production equipment.

Since 1957, he worked in RSFSR Gosplan, State Committee for automation and mechanical engineering under Council of Ministers of the Soviet Union. From 1965 to 1973, he was the head of Directorate of oil field mechanical engineering, member of the Board at the Ministry of Petroleum and Chemical Industry of the USSR.

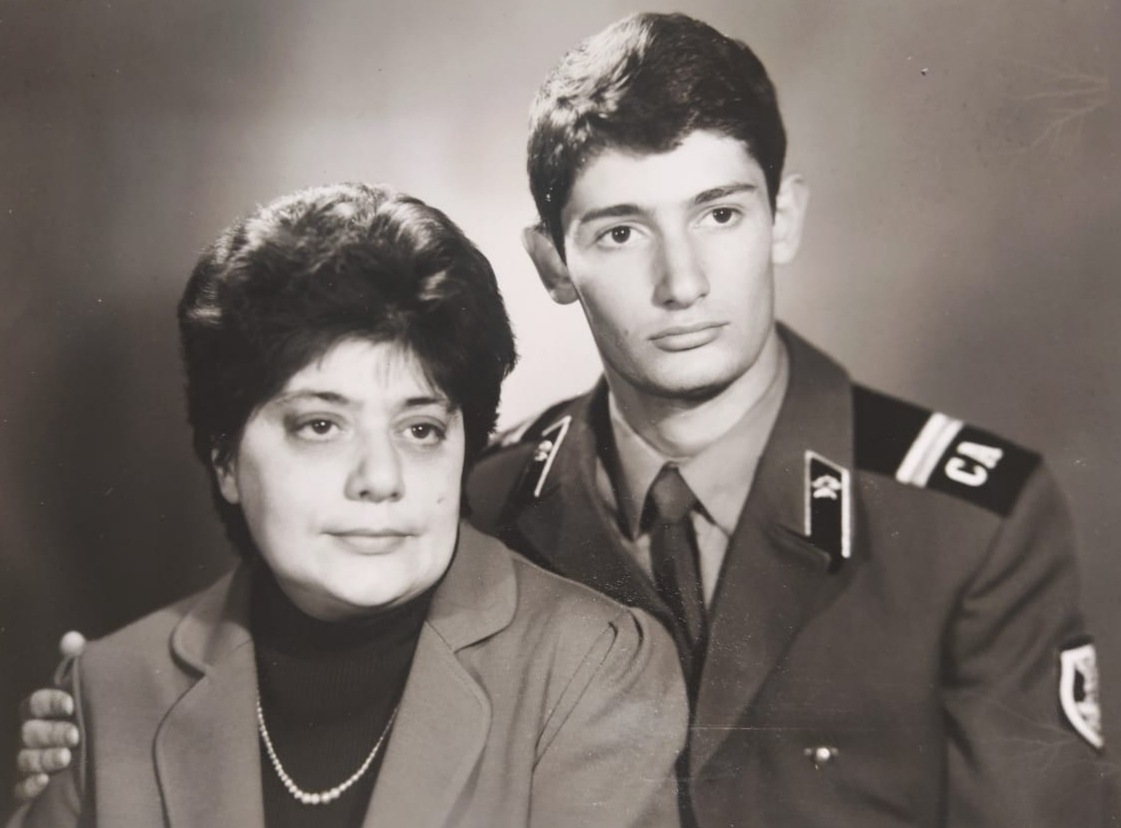
Irena and Norayr Arzumanov (1988)

Suren Arzumanov was married to Aida Egiazarova (1911–1964), the sister of the People's Artist of the RSFSR, Mosfilm film director Gavriil Egiazarov (1916–1988). The daughter — Irena Arzumanova (1943—2021), grandson — Norayr Arzumanov. Irena and Norayr graduated by Gubkin Russian State University of Oil and Gas.

== Honours and awards ==
- Order of Lenin
- Order of the Red Banner of Labour, twice
- Order of the Badge of Honour
- Medal "For the Defence of the Caucasus"
- Medal "For Valiant Labour in the Great Patriotic War 1941–1945"
- Jubilee Medal "In Commemoration of the 100th Anniversary of the Birth of Vladimir Ilyich Lenin"
- USSR State Prize (1949) — for creation of the new oil equipment types
- Honorary Oilman of the USSR (1968).
