= Majid Karimov =

Azerbaijan engineer and politician

- Məcid Zahid oğlu Kərimov

Minister for Fuel and Energy of the Republic of Azerbaijan
- In office 2001–2004

Minister for Industry and Energy of the Republic of Azerbaijan
- In office 2004–2005

President of the State Company Azerkhimiya
- In office 2005–2010

Deputy of the Parliament of the Republic of Azerbaijan of the third convocation
- In office 2005–2010

Personal details
- Born: 16 December 1958 (age 67) Baku, Azerbaijan SSR, Soviet Union
- Education: Azerbaijan State Oil and Industry University

Majid Karimov (Azerbaijani: Məcid Zahid oğlu Kərimov, born December 16, 1958, in Baku, Azerbaijan SSR) is an Azerbaijan statesman and public person.

Minister of Fuel and Energy of Azerbaijan from 2001 to 2004, Minister of Industry and Energy of Azerbaijan from 2004 to 2005. President of the State Company Azerikhimia from 2005 to 2010.

Deputy of the Parliament of the Republic of Azerbaijan of the third convocation from 2005 to 2010, and he is a member of the New Azerbaijan Party.

He holds a Doctor of Technical Sciences degree and is a professor specializing in the development of offshore oil and gas fields. He is also an Honored Scientist of the Republic of Azerbaijan.

== Biography ==
Majid Karimov was born on December 16, 1958, in Baku, into the family of a scientist.

He graduated from Secondary School No. 7 in Baku and, in 1980, from the Azerbaijan State Oil and Industry University (formerly Azerbaijan Institute of Oil and Chemistry named after M. Azizbekov). Later, in 1986, he also graduated from Azerbaijan State University named after S. M. Kirov.

Until 2001, Majid Karimov headed the State Scientific Research and Design Institute “Gipromorneftegaz” of the State Oil Company of the Azerbaijan Republic (SOCAR).

On April 18, 2001, the Ministry of Fuel and Energy was established. On the same day, by decree of the then President of the country, Heydar Aliyev, Kərimov was appointed head of the new ministry.

In 2001, by decree of the President of the Republic of Azerbaijan, Mr. Karimov was appointed Chairman of the Commission for the implementation of four major international projects:

- development of the offshore oil and gas fields Azeri–Chirag–Gunashli;
- development of the offshore gas-condensate field Shah Deniz;
- construction of the Baku–Tbilisi–Ceyhan export oil pipeline;
- construction of the Baku–Tbilisi–Erzurum export gas pipeline.

He supervised projects related to the development of oil and gas fields, transportation and processing of oil and gas, and the production of chemical and petrochemical products.

He also led the development of the following state programs approved by the President of the Republic of Azerbaijan:

- the State Program for the Development of the Fuel and Energy Complex of the Republic of Azerbaijan for 2005–2015;
- the State Program on the Use of Alternative Energy Sources in the Republic of Azerbaijan.

As a member of the government, he participated in various international conferences held in United Kingdom, Germany, France, Russia, Turkey, Norway, Saudi Arabia, Egypt, Georgia, and other countries. He chaired international oil and gas conferences traditionally held in Azerbaijan.

M. Karimov was an active participant in developing relations with international organizations such as the European Energy Charter and the Organization of the Black Sea Economic Cooperation, as well as international financial institutions including the World Bank, International Monetary Fund, Asian Development Bank, and the European Bank for Reconstruction and Development.

On December 6, 2004, the country’s President, Ilham Aliyev, abolished the Ministry of Fuel and Energy by decree, transferring its functions to the Ministry of Industry and Energy. From that time, Karimov served as Minister of Industry and Energy.

On December 9, 2005, President Ilham Aliyev signed an order appointing Kərimov as president of the state concern “Azerikimya” and, by another order, relieved him of his duties as Minister of Industry and Energy. He was succeeded by former SOCAR president Natig Aliyev as Minister of Industry and Energy.

Karimov was elected as a deputy of the III convocation of the Milli Majlis (Parliament) from the Sumgait II electoral district No. 42 for the period 2005–2010. Parliament included him in the permanent Commission on Legal Policy and State Building.

In September 2009, the Azerbaijani President approved the composition of the Commission for Preparing Proposals on the Strategic Development of the Oil Refining, Gas Processing, and Petrochemical Industry in Azerbaijan, of which Məcid Kərimov became a member.

He is the author of more than 200 scientific articles, 10 books and monographs, and 10 inventions.

He is married and has two children. He speaks Russian and English.
