= Sabit Orujov =

Soviet politician (1912–1981)

Sabit Atayevich Orujov (Azerbaijani: Sabit Atababa oğlu Orucov, Russian: Сабит Атаевич Оруджев; 31 May 1912 – 20 April 1981) was an Azerbaijani and Soviet politician, Deputy Prime-minister of Azerbaijan SSR (1957-1959), Deputy Minister of Oil Extracting Industry of USSR (1965-1972), Minister of the Gas Industry of USSR (1972-1981) and member of the Central Committee of the Communist Party of the Soviet Union (1981).

== Career ==
Sabit Orujov was born in the city of Baku, Azerbaijan. His father was a local building contractor and stonemason. At the age of 16 he was teaching in a local school and by the age of 26 he had graduated from the Azerbaijan Industrial Institute. In 1936 he started working for Ordzhonikidzeneft at a compressor station. He became assistant production manager and then production manager of Field 5 for Ordzhonikidzeneft.

In 1939, Orujov was a deputy head of production at Field 1 for Ordzhonikidzeneft and later production head at Field 9. He was subsequently deputy director of Azneft and later became Director of Stalinneft. In 1946 he became Chief Engineer of Krasnodarneft and in 1948 he was appointed General Director of Aznefterazvetka (Azerbaijan Oil Exploration).

In 1949, Orujov was transferred to Moscow where he was made Head of Oil Exploration and Production at the Ministry of Oil Production of the USSR. in 1953 he was head of oil production for the Western Regions and by 1955 he had been promoted to Deputy Minister.

In 1957, Orujov was made Chairman of Sovnarkhoz (Ministry of Economy) of the USSR and from 1960 to 1962 he was Chairman of the Council of Ministers of the Azerbaijan Soviet Socialist Republic.

== Awards ==
Orujov was a laureate of the Stalin Prize (twice: 1950 and 1951), Lenin Prize (1970), three Orders of Lenin, Order of the October Revolution, four Orders of the Red Banner of Labour, Hero of Socialist Labour (1980).
