= Chingiz Khalifa-zade =

Soviet-Azerbaijani geologist

Professor Chingiz Muzafar oglu Khalifa-zade (Azerbaijani: Xəlifəzadə Çingiz Müzəfər oğlu, born 17 February 1931 in Nukha, Soviet Union) is an Azerbaijani and Soviet geologist and Professor of Geology and Mineralogy and Petrology; and Head of Department at Azerbaijan State Oil Academy; and President of the Sedimentological Society of Azerbaijan; and Academician at the International Eco-Energy Academy; and Honorary foreign member of the Russian Academy of Natural Sciences.

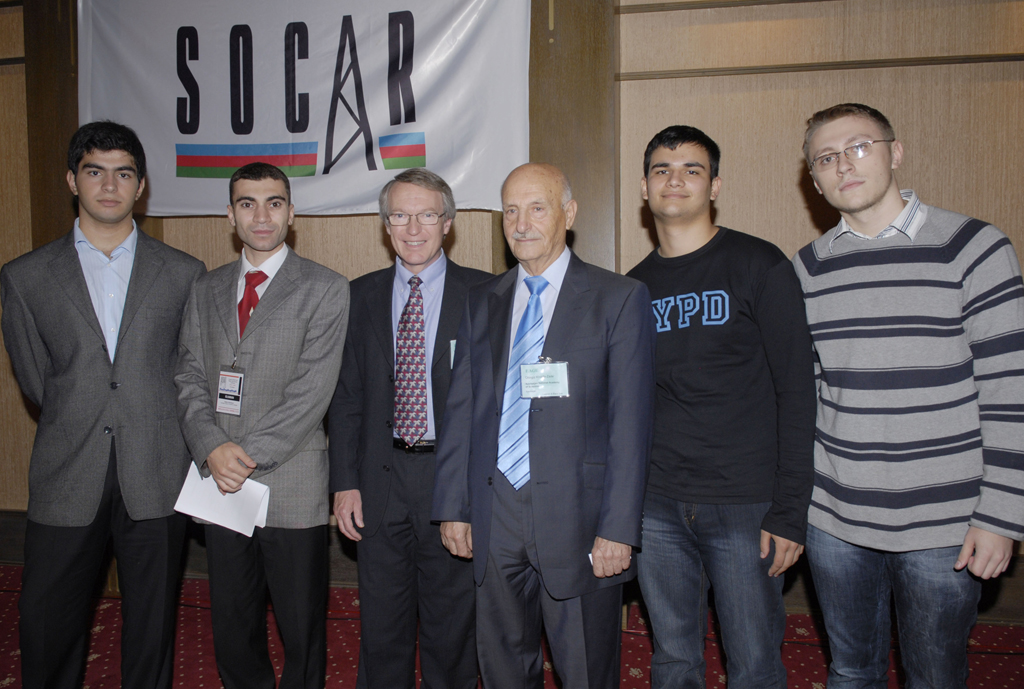
Students and Professor Khalifazade, third from the right

== Career ==
In 1952, Khalifa-zade graduated from Baku State University (Department of Geology). In 1955, he prepared PhD thesis related the Mineralogy and Middle Jurassic Argullicies of the South-East Caucasus and received Candidate of Science degree (Ph.D.). Later, he held positions as Senior Scientist, Head of Division and Acting Head of the Institute of Geology, Makhachkala, Dagestan, Russian Federation, USSR.

In 1972, Khalifa-zade obtained Doctor of Science degree on Geology and Mineralogy from the Institute of Geology (now GIN RAS), Moscow, Soviet (Russian) Academy of Science., In 1975, he received the rank of Professor of Geology and Mineral Deposits at Baku State University. In 1980–1981, he headed the Baku-based United Nation courses and training programs on Geology for professionals from Turkey, Nigeria, Vietnam, Bulgaria, Tanzania, Nepal, Burma, Yemen, Bangladesh, Egypt and other developing countries. He also was a scientific adviser for the Saatli Superdeep well (Saatli, Azerbaijan).

In 1980, he was awarded the title of Honorable Geologist of Azerbaijan SSR. In 2000, he received Azerbaijan's Medal of Progress, awarded by the President of Azerbaijan, H.E. Heydar Aliyev, on occasion of the 80th Anniversary of Azerbaijan State Oil Academy.

Since 1981, Khalifa-zade is Full Professor and Head of Department of Mineralogy and Petrology at Azerbaijan State Oil Academy. He also is a member of the American Association of Petroleum Geologists (AAPG), Houston (USA and President of the Sedimentological Society of Azerbaijan.

Since 2008, Khalifa-zade is an honorary foreign member of the Russian Academy of Natural Sciences.

Khalifa-zade is a member of editorial board of the International Journal of Stratigraphy And Sedimentology Of Oil-Gas Basins, Baku, Azerbaijan National Academy of Science

== Activities ==
In 1978, Khalifa-zade lectured at the University of London and Imperial College, United Kingdom. In 1992, he lectured at the Middle East Technical University (METU), Ankara, Turkey; and within 1991–1992, he was a visiting professor at University of Cairo and University of Alexandria, Egypt.

He was a member of Soviet and Azerbaijani delegations at DC, XI, XII, XIV and XVII International Congresses on Sedimentology (France, 1975, Canada 1982, Australia 1986, Bulgaria 1989 and Romania 1998) and chaired the Section on Sedimentology and Geochemistry.

=== List of Awards and Certificates ===
- Honored geologist of Azerbaijan in 1980;
- State medal of Azerbaijan in 2001;
- Awarded with a gold medal by the American Institute of International Biography (USA, Washington) in 2006;
- Foreign member of the Academy of Natural Sciences of the Russian Federation in 2008;
- Honored Oilman of the Democratic Republic of Vietnam in 2010;
- Medal of the leading teacher of Azerbaijani Ministry of Education in 2010.

== Publications ==
Khalifa-zade authored more than 270 articles, 4 text-books and 5 monographs (in Azerbaijani, English and Russian). He also authored Sideritovye zalezhi Dagestana (Siderit Deposits of Dagestan), book, in-Russian, Moscow, Nauka Publishing house, 1963; co-authored Srednei︠u︡rskie otlozhenii︠a︡ vostochnoĭ chasti Bolʹshogo Kavkaza (Middle Jurassic Deposits of the Eastern Part of the Greater Caucasus), book, in-Russian, Moscow, Nauka Publishing house, 1982 and co-authored Mineralogii︠a︡ i genezis boksitovykh porod Nakhichevanskoĭ ASSR (Mineralogy and Geneses of the Boksit Deposits of Nakhcivan ASSR), book, in-Russian, 1986, Elm publishing-house, Baku, Azerbaijan.

=== Textbooks ===
- The Course of Lithology and Fascia, in-Azerbaijani, Maarif publishing house, Baku, Azerbaijan SSR, 1982
- Secrets of the Moon', in-Azerbaijani, Azernesr publishing house, Baku, Azerbaijan SSR, 1979
