= Ogtay Shahbazov =

Azerbaijani statesman (born 1941)

Ogtay Shahbazov Oqtay Şahbazov

Head of the President's Administrative Services Department
- In office January 15, 2016 – January 26, 2021

First Deputy Head of the President's Administrative Services Department
- In office May 11, 1993 – January 15, 2016

Personal details
- Born: November 1, 1941 (age 84) Erivan, Armenian SSR, USSR
- Party: New Azerbaijan Party
- Children: Parviz Shahbazov
- Parent: Gasham Shahbazov (father)
- Education: Azerbaijan Institute of Foreign Languages
- Awards

Ogtay Gasham oghlu Shahbazov (Azerbaijani: Oqtay Qəşəm oğlu Şahbazov, born November 1, 1941) is the statesman, Head of the President's Administrative Services Department (2016-2021), 1st degree State Counselor of the Civil Service, "Honored Civil Servant" (2015) and laureate of the Shohrat Order (2011).

== Biography ==
Ogtay Shahbazov was born on November 1, 1941 in Erivan. In 1959–1964, he studied at the Azerbaijan Institute of Foreign Languages and qualified as a teacher of the Azerbaijani and German languages. He worked as a German language teacher in secondary school number 126, then for many years he was a German language teacher at the Department of Foreign Languages of the Kirov Higher Khazar Naval School.

Since 1980, he worked in various management positions in the Administrative Services Department of the Council of Ministers of the Azerbaijan SSR, and in 1990 he was appointed as the head of the Administrative Services Department of the Central Committee of the Communist Party of Azerbaijan. In 1991, he was elected a deputy of the Supreme Soviet of the Republic of Azerbaijan at the 12th convocation, and was awarded the Order of Honor of the Supreme Soviet of the Republic of Azerbaijan for his active and efficient work.

From 1991, he worked as the First Deputy Head of the President's Administrative Services Department, from 2016 to January 26, 2021, as the Head of the President's Administrative Services Department.
