= Asya Manafova =

Member of parliament of Azerbaijan (1995–2005)

Member of the Parliament of Azerbaijan of the 1st convocation
- In office 1995–2005
- President: Heydar Aliyev; Ilham Aliyev

Member of the Supreme Soviet of Azerbaijan of the 12th convocation
- In office 1991–1995
- President: Ayaz Mutallibov; Yagub Mammadov; Abulfaz Elchibey; Heydar Aliyev

Personal details
- Born: 3 January 1941 (age 85) Qusar, Azerbaijan Soviet Socialist Republic (SSR)
- Party: Azerbaijan Communist Party; New Azerbaijan Party
- Education: Azerbaijan State Oil and Industry University
- Occupation: Politician and diplomat

Asya Manafova (born 3 January 1941) is a former Azerbaijani politician of the Communist Party of Azerbaijan then the New Azerbaijan Party. She was a member of the Supreme Soviet of Azerbaijan of the 12th convocation (1991–1995) and of the National Assembly of Azerbaijan from (1995–2005). She later worked as a diplomat at the Azerbaijani Embassy in Belarus.

== Biography ==
Manafova was born on 3 January 1941 in Qusar, Azerbaijan Soviet Socialist Republic (SSR). She graduated from the Azerbaijan State University of Oil and Industry and speaks Turkish, Lezgin, and Russian.

From 1990 to 1991, Manafova was First Secretary of the district committee of the Communist Party of Azerbaijan in Gusar district. She became a member of the Supreme Soviet of Azerbaijan of the 12th convocation (1991–1995), which was the main legislative institution of the SSR. In 1994, Manafova was appointed to the parliamentary commission on refugees and relations with compatriots living abroad.

Manafova was a founder of the ruling New Azerbaijan Party, serving on the Board of Directors. When a semi-presidential system was implemented in 1005 she became a member of National Assembly of Azerbaijan, serving from 1995 to 2005. On 12 November 1995, she was elected as a member of the Parliament of Azerbaijan of the 1st convocation. On 5 November 2000, she was elected as a member of the Parliament of Azerbaijan of the 2nd convocation [az]. In September 2003, Manafova participated in the second Congress of Women of Azerbaijan.

Whilst in Parliament, Manafova served as chair of the parliamentary commission for natural resources, ecology and energy. In 2004, she attended the World Forum meeting on the topic of the “Use of Restorable Energy Resources,” organised by the Ministries for Economic Cooperation, Environment and Conservancy of Germany.

From 2010, Manafova worked at the Azerbaijani Embassy in Belarus with Ali Nagiyev. She has retired from politics and lives in Baku, Azerbaijan.
