= Nasrulla Nasrullayev =

Azerbaijani

- Nəsrulla Nəsrullayev
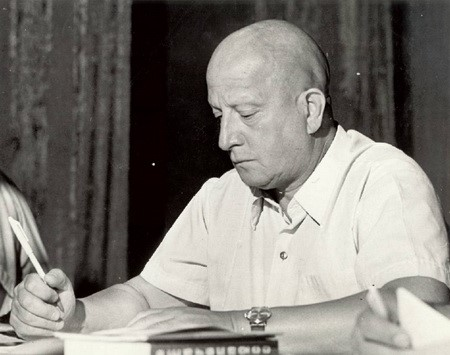

Minister of Light Industry of the Azerbaijan SSR
- In office October 24, 1975 – April 26, 1978
- Preceded by: Sadig Rahimov
- Succeeded by: Anvar Malikov

Minister of Communications of the Azerbaijan SSR
- In office March 17, 1969 – October 24, 1975
- Preceded by: Teymur Huseynov
- Succeeded by: Huseyn Rasulbayov

Personal details
- Born: October 24, 1920 Baku, Baku Uyezd, Azerbaijan SSR
- Died: April 26, 1978 (aged 57) Baku, Azerbaijan SSR, USSR
- Resting place: Alley of Honor
- Party: All-Union Communist (Bolshevik) Party
- Children: Namig Nasrullayev
- Awards: Order of the October Revolution Order of the Red Banner of Labour Honored Engineer of the Azerbaijan SSR

Nasrulla Hidayat oghlu Nasrullayev (Azerbaijani: Nəsrulla Hidayət oğlu Nəsrullayev; 24 October 1920 — 26 April 1978) was a socio-political figure and scientist of Azerbaijan, Minister of Light Industry of the Azerbaijan SSR (1975–1978) and Minister of Communications of the Azerbaijan SSR (1969–1975).

== Biography ==
Nasrulla Nasrullayev was born in Baku. In 1927, he first studied at school No. 9 in Baku, then in the electrical engineering department of the Azerbaijan Industrial Polytechnic, in the energy department of the Azerbaijan Industrial Institute, and graduated in 1941. He was a candidate of technical sciences, associate professor.

Nasrullayev began his career in 1936 as a student and worked as a duty technician in the system of the Azerbaijan Energy Department. He worked as a teacher at the factory school of the Caspian Oil Shipping Department and at the Baku Oil Engineering College. From 1941 to 1944 he worked at the plant as an engineer, shop manager, chief power engineer. In 1945-1947 he was an instructor in the department of power plants and electric industry of the Central Committee of the Communist Party of Azerbaijan, and then in the department of oil industry.

In 1947–1960, Nasrullayev was the director of the Baku Electrical Engineering Plant. In 1960-1961 he was appointed chief of the Department of Electrical Industry of the Council of National Economy of the Azerbaijan SSR, in 1961-1966 he worked as the first secretary of the Baku City Committee of the Azerbaijan Communist Party. In 1966–1969, he was deputy chairman of the State Planning Committee of the Azerbaijan SSR, Minister of Communications of the Azerbaijan SSR from 1969 to 1975, and Minister of Light Industry of the Azerbaijan SSR from 1975 to the last days of his life.

Nasrulla Nasrullayev was elected a member of the Central Committee of the Communist Party of Azerbaijan at the XXV, XXVI, XXVIII and XXIX Congresses of the Communist Party of Azerbaijan, a deputy of the Supreme Soviet of the Soviet Union (6th convocation) and the Supreme Soviet of the Azerbaijan SSR (5th, 8th-9th convocations). He was awarded the Order of the October Revolution, the Order of the Red Banner of Labour twice and medals.

Nasrulla Nasrullayev died on April 26, 1978, after a long illness. He was buried on April 27 in the Alley of Honor.

== Memorial ==
The film "Nasrulla Nasrullayev" was made in 1999.

On October 19, 2005, the President of Azerbaijan signed an order to erect a memorial plaque in the building where Nasrulla Nasrullayev lived in order to perpetuate his memory. The memorial plaque was unveiled on April 1, 2006.
