= Fazila Samadova =

Azerbaijani academician and chemical engineer-technologist (1929–2020)

- Fazila Ibrahim gizi Samadova
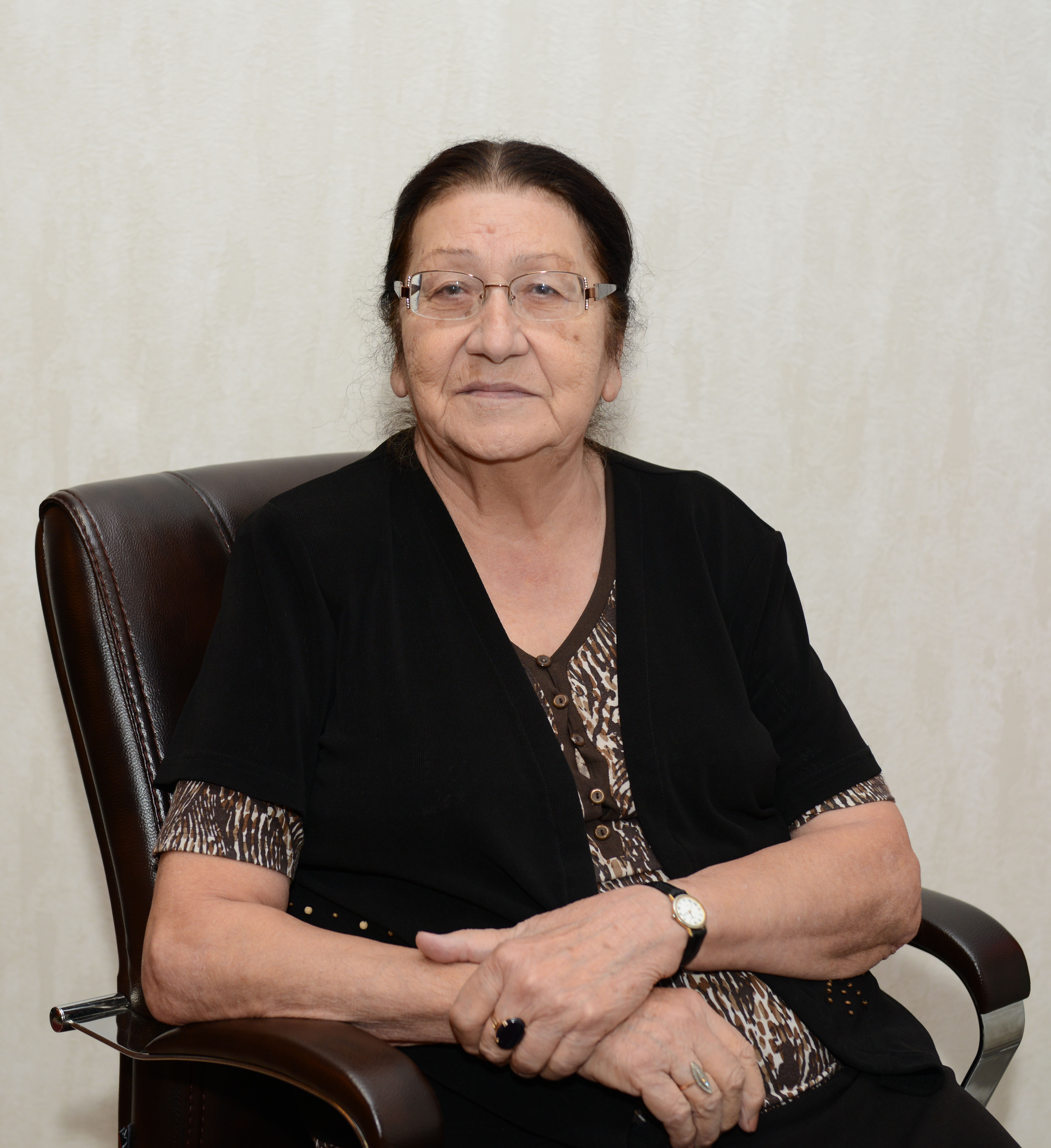
- Born: 29 March 1929
- Died: 8 January 2020 (aged 90)
- Awards: Honorary Scientist of Europe, Alexander Humboldt medal
- Scientific career
- Fields: Chemistry and Technology of Oils
- Thesis: "The effect of the chemical composition of oils on their performance properties"

Fazila Ibrahim gizi Samadova, also known as Fazila Samedova (Azerbaijani: Fəzilə Səmədova; 29 March 1929, Shamakhi – 8 January 2020, Baku), was an Azerbaijani academician chemical engineer-technologist. She was a Doctor of Chemical Sciences, Honored Scientist, Member of New York Academy of Sciences, Head of the Laboratory at the Research Institute of Petrochemical Processes, Corresponding Member of Azerbaijan National Academy of Sciences (ANAS), Honorary Scientist of Europe.

== Early life and education ==
Fazila Samadova was born on 29 March 1929 in Shamakhi, Republic of Azerbaijan. In 1946, she graduated from Baku secondary school No. 132 with a gold medal. The same year, Samadova was admitted to the Faculty of Chemical Technology of the Azerbaijan Industrial Institute named after M. Azizbayov.

After graduating from the institute in 1951, Samedova received a diploma in chemical engineering and continued her studies from 1951 to 1955 as a postgraduate student at the Gubkin Russian State University of Oil and Gas.

== Career ==
Samadova started her first scientific developments in the 1950s as a postgraduate student at the Gubkin Russian State University of Oil and Gas and at the Azerbaijan Industrial Institute, after which she continued them already at the Institute of Petroleum Industry. In 1956, she defended her dissertation on "The effect of the chemical composition of oils on their performance properties" and received the degree of Candidate of Technical Sciences.

From 1960 to 1981, Samadova worked in the laboratory "Chemistry and Technology of Oils" of the Azerbaijan State Institute of Petrochemical Processes named after M. Aliyev as a senior researcher. The results of research conducted by Samadova in 1960-1973 were reflected in the dissertation of the scientist on "Research of obtaining distillate and residual oils from Baku paraffin oils with high cost-effective technologies and prospects for production in Azerbaijan" and she successfully defended her doctorate.

From 1982, Samadova was in charge of the laboratory "Research of oils and technology of oils". From 1986, she headed the Petroleum Research and Oil Technology Laboratory of the NKPI.

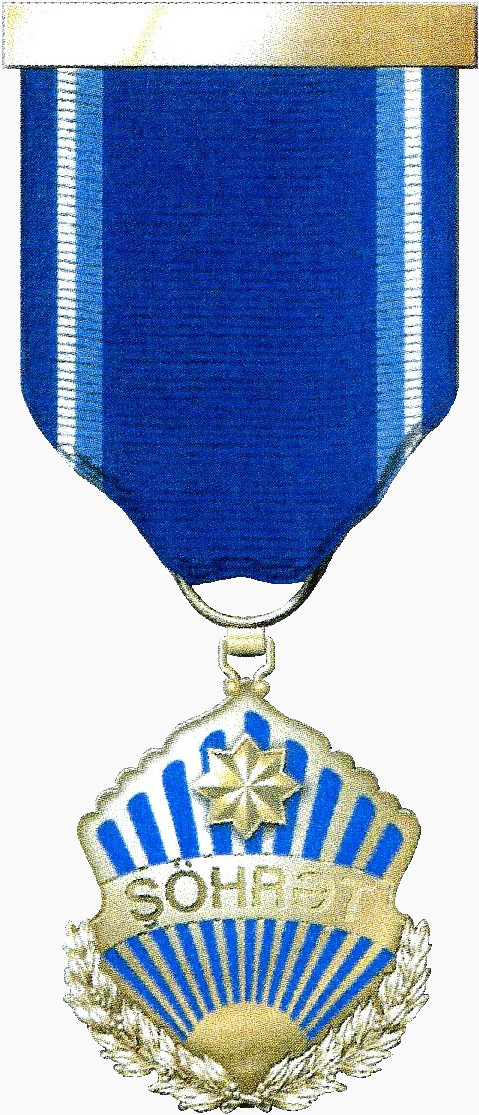
Şöhrət ordeni-2009

Samadova was awarded the title of Professor of Oil and Gas Technology (1987), the title of Honored Scientist of Azerbaijan (1991), and elected a full member of the New York Academy of Sciences. Since 2001, she has become a corresponding member of Azerbaijan National Academy of Sciences (ANAS).

The results of Samadova's research work are reflected in 530 scientific works, including 24 monographs, 1 publicist book, 64 author's certificates and patents. One of her monographs is dedicated to the memory of her brother, explorer Fuad Samedov, the discoverer of Oil Rocks.

Samadova was repeatedly elected a member of academic councils and specialized scientific commissions, both in Azerbaijan and outside the country. She was a member of the editorial board of two scientific journals. Under her leadership, 4 doctors of science and 20 doctors of philosophy were trained.

Samadova died on 8 January 2020 in Baku at the age of 91.

== Awards ==
In 2004 Samadova received the Shohrat Order.

In 2012, Samadova was awarded the title of Honorary Scientist of Europe and Alexander von Humboldt Medal.
