= Arif Valiyev =

Azerbaijani politician

Arif Valiyev Arif Vəliyev

Chairman of the State Statistics Committee of Azerbaijan Republic
- Incumbent
- Assumed office May 1993
- President: Abulfaz Elchibey, Heydar Aliyev, Ilham Aliyev
- Preceded by: Ajdar Aliyev

Personal details
- Born: June 28, 1943 Hasansu, Agstafa District, Azerbaijan SSR
- Died: June 22, 2014 (aged 70) Baku, Azerbaijan

Arif Valiyev Mikayil oglu (Azerbaijani: Arif Vəliyev Mikayıl oğlu) was an Azerbaijani politician who served as the Chairman of the State Statistics Committee of Azerbaijan Republic.

== Early life ==
Valiyev was born on June 28, 1943, in Hasansu village of Agstafa District, Azerbaijan. In 1971, he graduated from the Azerbaijan State Economic University.

== Political career ==
In May 1993, Valiyev was appointed the Chairman of the State Statistics Committee of Azerbaijan Republic, the post which he has held to this day.

He was married and has two sons. He died in Baku in 2014 after a long illness.

== See also ==
- Cabinet of Azerbaijan
