= Rasim Musabeyov =

Azerbaijani politician

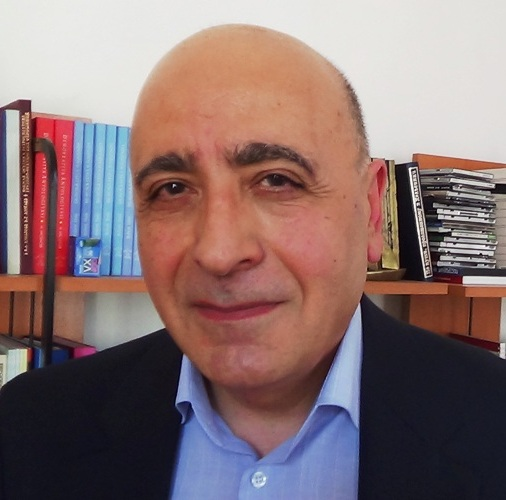

Member of the National Assembly of Azerbaijan
- Incumbent
- Assumed office 6 November 2010
- Preceded by: Constituency created
- Constituency: Nizami district

Personal details
- Born: Rasim Nasreddin oglu Musabeyov; 1 January 1951 (age 75) Baku, Azerbaijani SSR, USSR
- Party: Independent
- Education: Azerbaijan State Oil Academy

Rasim Nasreddin oglu Musabeyov, sometimes known as Rasim Musabekov, (Azerbaijani: Rasim Nəsrəddin oğlu Musabəyov, born on 1 January 1951 in Baku, Azerbaijani SSR, USSR) is a member of the National Assembly of Azerbaijan, political scientist and specialist in conflict resolution. He worked as foreign policy state advisor for Azerbaijan president between 1991 and 1993. He held the position of chief legal adviser of the Foundation for the Promotion of Entrepreneurship and Market Economy from 1999 to 2010.
