= Elmira Ramazanova =

Azerbaijani geologist

- Born: 28 October 1934; Baku, Azerbaijan Soviet Socialist Republic, Soviet Union
- Died: 8 December 2020 (aged 86)
- Occupation: Geologist
- Awards: Corresponding member of the Azerbaijan National Academy of Sciences (2007); Shohrat Order (2014)

Academic background
- Education: Azerbaijan State Oil and Industry University
- Thesis: Разработка и исследование методики расчета условий разделения газа в газоконденсатных системах (1965)

Academic work
- Discipline: Geology
- Sub-discipline: Efficiency of oil and gas extraction
- Institutions: Azerbaijan State Oil and Industry University; Geotechnological Problems of Oil, Gas and Chemistry Scientific Research Institute

Elmira Mammadamin gizi Ramazanova (Azerbaijani: Elmira Məmmədəmin qızı Ramazanova; 28 October 1934 – 8 December 2020) was an Azerbaijani geologist and petroleum engineer who specialized in the efficiency of oil and gas extraction and was a professor at Azerbaijan State Oil and Industry University.

== Early life and education ==
Elmira Mammadamin gizi Ramazanova was born on 28 October 1934 in Baku, the capital of the Azerbaijan Soviet Socialist Republic (now Azerbaijan), and was educated at School No. 134 in Baku and the Azerbaijan Industrial Institute (now Azerbaijan State Oil and Industry University. In 1965, she received her PhD in Technical Sciences, with her thesis titled "Razrabotka i issledovaniye metodiki rascheta usloviy razdeleniya gaza v gazokondensatnykh sistemakh" (Russian: Разработка и исследование методики расчета условий разделения газа в газоконденсатных системах, lit. 'Development and study of a methodology for calculating the conditions for gas separation in gas condensate systems').

== Career ==
After working for sometime at the Azerbaijan SSR's energy department, she remained at the Azerbaijan Industrial Institute (by then renamed the Azerbaijan Oil and Chemistry Institute) as a faculty member, eventually being promoted to the rank of professor in 1978. In 1975, she received a Doctorate of Technical Sciences, with her thesis titled "Termodinamicheskiye issledovaniya neftyanykh i gazokondensatnykh mestorozhdeniy na osnove primeneniya metodov adaptatsii" (Russian: Термодинамические исследования нефтяных и газоконденсатных месторождений на основе применения методов адаптации, lit. 'Thermodynamic studies of oil and gas condensate fields based on the application of adaptation methods'). In 1992, she moved to the Geotechnological Problems of Oil, Gas and Chemistry Scientific Research Institute, where she became director that same year, and she subsequently remained in that position until her death.

As an academic, Ramazanova specialized in the efficiency of oil and gas extraction. In 1986, she and Fuad Veliyev wrote the book "Prikladnaya termodinamika neftegazokondensatnykh mestorozhdeniy" (Russian: Прикладная термодинамика нефтегазоконденсатных месторождений, lit. 'Applied thermodynamics of oil and gas condensate fields'). She served on the editorial board of the Azerbaijan Oil Industry Journal. She was vice-president of the country's National Oil Committee and, according to Azerbaijani newspaper İki sahil, "devoted her life and all her work to the development of oil and gas science and the oil and gas industry in Azerbaijan".

== Recognition ==
Ramazanova won several awards, including Order of the Badge of Honour in 1986, Honored Science Worker of the Azerbaijan SSR (1990), Honored Oilman of the USSR (1990), and the Shohrat Order in 2014 (for her "services in training highly qualified specialists for the oil and gas industry in the Republic of Azerbaijan"). In 2007, Ramazanova was elected to the Azerbaijan National Academy of Sciences as a corresponding member.

Ramazanova died on 8 December 2020, aged 86.
