= Sadig Rahimov =

- Sadıq Rəhimov

4th Chairman of the Council of Ministers of the Azerbaijan SSR
- In office March 9, 1954 – July 8, 1958
- Preceded by: Teymur Guliyev
- Succeeded by: Vali Akhundov

Minister of Light Industry of the Azerbaijan SSR
- In office January 31, 1949 – May 1952
- In office October 20, 1965 – June 11, 1975
- Succeeded by: Nasrulla Nasrullayev

Chief of Baku Main Construction Department
- In office April 1961 – October 1965

Chairman of the Executive Committee of Ganja region
- In office May 1952 – April 1953

Minister of Textile Industry of the Azerbaijan SSR
- In office 1946 – January 31, 1949

Deputy Minister of Textile Industry of the Azerbaijan SSR
- In office 1942–1946

Personal details
- Born: September 27, 1914 Balaxanı, Baku uezd, Baku Governorate, Russian Empire
- Died: June 11, 1975 (aged 60) Baku, Azerbaijan SSR, Soviet Union
- Resting place: Alley of Honor
- Party: CPSU
- Education: Azerbaijan Industrial Institute
- Awards: Order of Lenin Order of the Badge of Honour Order of the Red Banner Order of the Red Banner of Labour

Military service
- Battles/wars: Eastern Front (World War II)

Sadig Hajiyarali oghlu Rahimov (Azerbaijani: Sadıq Hacıyarəli oğlu Rəhimov, September 27, 1914 – June 11, 1975) was the Statesman of the Azerbaijan SSR, Chairman of the Council of Ministers of the Azerbaijan SSR (1954–1958), member of the Presidium of the Supreme Soviet of the Azerbaijan SSR.

== Biography ==
He was born on September 27, 1914, in Balaxanı in a family of oil worker. Rahimov graduated from Balaxanı village school in 1929 and entered Baku oil technical school. After successfully graduating from the technical school in 1931, Rahimov began his career as a technician at the Baku Machine-Building Plant.

In 1932–1936, Rahimov was first a technician and then the head of a mechanical workshop at the Baku Shoe Factory No. 2 of the Azerbaijan Light Industry Commissariat. In addition to working in the factory, in 1932 he entered the faculty of mechanical engineering of the Azerbaijan Industrial Institute. He resigned temporarily in 1936 to write his dissertation and pass his final exams.

Rahimov, who defended his diploma work with excellent marks in 1937, was again sent to Baku Shoe Factory No. 2 as a deputy chief mechanic as a certified engineer. In 1937–1938, Rahimov worked as a deputy chief mechanic at Baku Shoe Factory No. 2, in 1938–1939 as a chief mechanic, and in 1939 as a director of that factory.

He was the grandfather of Azad Rahimov.

Rahimov died on June 11, 1975, in Baku and was buried in the Alley of Honor. In 2014, the President of the Republic of Azerbaijan signed an order on holding the 100th anniversary of Rahimov.

== During the war ==
In 1939, the republican government sent him to Moscow to study at the Higher Party School. He left his education in 1941 and went to the front due to the outbreak of the Great Patriotic War. In 1941–1942, Rahimov was the head of the political department of the 160th Rifle Division of the Soviet Army fighting on the Western Front, took an active part in the battles around Moscow and Smolensk, was wounded in the battles near the city of Vyazma and was sent back.

Rahimov, who was discharged from military service due to severe injuries, returned to Baku and was appointed Deputy Minister of Textile Industry of Azerbaijan.

== Career ==
Sadig Rahimov held this position in 1942–1946, and in 1946–1949 he served as Minister of Textile Industry of the Azerbaijan SSR. In 1949, a number of ministries in the republic were abolished and some were merged. At that time, the Ministry of Textile Industry and the Ministry of Light Industry were merged and Rahimov was appointed Minister of Light Industry of the Azerbaijan SSR. He served in this position from 1949 to 1952.

In 1952, Azerbaijan was divided into two provinces: Baku and Ganja. In April 1952, by the decision of the presidium of the Supreme Soviet of the Azerbaijan SSR, Rahimov was appointed chairman of the Ganja Regional Executive Committee. He served in this position from 1952 to 1953. However, the regional structure did not function much in Azerbaijan and was abolished a year later. Rahimov returned to Baku after the abolition of Ganja region, became the Minister of Public Utilities and Civil Construction of the Azerbaijan SSR, then the Minister of Highly Processed Industrial Goods and held these positions in 1953-1954.

Rahimov was the chairman of the Council of Ministers of the Azerbaijan SSR in 1954–1958. In 1958-1961, Rahimov chaired the State Committee for Control over Industrial Safety and Mining of the Council of Ministers of the Republic, and in 1961-1965 he was the head of the Baku Main Construction Department. In 1965-1975, Rahimov headed the Ministry of Light Industry of the Azerbaijan SSR.

Rahimov has repeatedly been a member of the Central Committee of the Communist Party of Azerbaijan and its bureau, the Supreme Soviet of the Azerbaijan SSR and its presidium, a deputy of the Supreme Soviets of Azerbaijan and the USSR, a delegate to plenary sessions, conferences, congresses and sessions.

== Awards ==
- Order of Lenin
- Order of the Badge of Honour
- Order of the Red Banner
- Order of the Red Banner of Labour

== Literature ==
- Qasımlı, Musa; Hüseynov, Cavid (2005). Azərbaycanın baş nazirləri. Bakı.
