= Nazim Muradov =

American researcher

Nazim Z. Muradov
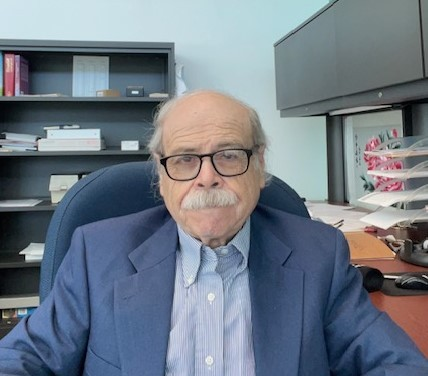
- Born: June 1947 (age 79); Azerbaijan SSR, Soviet Union
- Occupations: Researcher, author and inventor
- Awards: R&D100 Award, R&D100 Magazine (2014); Jules Verne Award, International Association for Hydrogen Energy (2018); Progress Medal (State Award), Republic of Azerbaijan (2022)

Academic background
- Education: BS/MS., Petrochemical Engineering; PhD., Kinetics and Catalysis; DSc., Physical Chemistry
- Alma mater: Azerbaijan Oil and Chemistry Institute (currently, Azerbaijan State Oil and Industry University)

Academic work
- Institutions: University of Central Florida
- Main interests: Hydrogen energy and technology

Nazim Z. Muradov is an American researcher, author, and inventor in the field of clean energy technology. He is a professor at the Florida Solar Energy Center, University of Central Florida.

Muradov has conducted research on thermocatalytic and photocatalytic hydrogen production systems, solar-powered water-splitting cycles, zero-emission reformers for fuel cell applications and hydrogen sensors. He is a Fellow of the International Association for Hydrogen Energy and the National Academy of Inventors.

== Education and career ==
Muradov earned a BS/MS in Petrochemical Engineering from Azerbaijan Oil and Chemistry Institute in Baku, Azerbaijan SSR, in 1970, followed by a PhD in Kinetics and Catalysis in 1975 and a Doctor of Science in Physical Chemistry in 1990, both from the Semenov Institute of Chemical Physics in Moscow, Soviet Union.

Muradov has been a member of the board of directors of the International Association for Hydrogen Energy (IAHE) since 2008. He was a member of the board of trustees and the Scientific Council of the Madrid Institute for Advanced Studies, IMDEA Energia (Spain) from 2008 to 2022 and an emeritus editor of the International Journal of Hydrogen Energy (IJHE) from 2007 to 2022.

== Research contributions ==
Muradov has been one of the early participants of the Hydrogen Movement, which he joined in the late 1970s. In late 1980s, he introduced the concept of CO_{2} -free hydrogen production via the direct methane decomposition (DMD) process. Later, he continued working on the technological foundations of this concept and was subsequently named "the father of DMD" by an international group of experts in the field in a paper published in the International Journal of Hydrogen Energy.

Muradov's research group discovered and studied different types of conical and three-dimensional carbon nanostructures and their production methods. He headed the research project on developing a process for hydrogen production from Florida's local biomass feedstocks for NASA's space program. As a member of the NASA-UCF research team, he participated in the development of a hydrogen sensor, which was tested during NASA's Space Shuttle Endeavour mission. For this work, the NASA-UCF team was nominated for NASA's Blue Marble Award in 2010 and received the R&D100 Award. From 2021 to 2024, he was a principal investigator (PI) of a climate-focused project for the development and commercialization of modular plants-on-wheels to convert stranded methane sources into low-carbon fuels.

== Books and publications ==
Muradov has authored and co-authored two books and six book chapters on the role of hydrogen and carbon-neutral fuels in decarbonizing a fossil fuel-based economy. He has also written an encyclopedia article on the hydrogen fuel topic and coauthored refereed research papers.

Muradov has been awarded 44 US patents and 6 foreign patents in the areas of hydrogen energy and technology, nanostructured carbon materials, advanced biofuels, and environmental remediation.

== Awards and honors ==
- 2010 – Fellow, International Association for Hydrogen Energy
- 2012 – Excellence in Research Award, UCF Institutes & Centers
- 2013 – The Most Prolific Inventors at UCF, Orlando Business Journal
- 2014 – R&D100 Award, R&D100 Magazine
- 2016 – Fellow, National Academy of Inventors
- 2017 – Editorial "Celebrating the 70th anniversary of Dr. Nazim Muradov", International Journal of Hydrogen Energy
- 2018 – Jules Verne Award, International Association for Hydrogen Energy
- 2021 – Honorary Professor, Azerbaijan State Oil and Industry University
- 2022 – Jubilee Medal, Republic of Azerbaijan
- 2022 – Progress Medal (State Award), Republic of Azerbaijan
- 2024 – Highly Ranked Scholar (Top 0.05% worldwide), ScholarGPS
