= Parviz Shahbazov =

Azerbaijani politician

- Pərviz Şahbazov
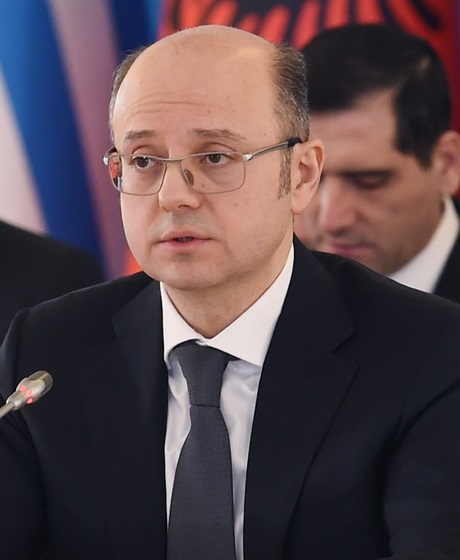
- Shahbazov in 2018

Minister of Energy
- Incumbent
- Assumed office October 12, 2017
- President: Ilham Aliyev
- Preceded by: Natig Aliyev

Personal details
- Born: November 24, 1969 Baku, Azerbaijan SSR, Soviet Union
- Parent: Ogtay Shahbazov (father)
- Education: Azerbaijan State Oil and Industry University

Parviz Ogtay oghlu Shahbazov (Azerbaijani: Pərviz Oqtay oğlu Şahbazov; November 24, 1969) is an Azerbaijani politician. He is serving as the Minister of Energy of the Azerbaijan Republic.

== Life ==
Parviz Shahbazov was born in Baku on November 24, 1969. Married, with two children.

In 1992, he graduated from Azerbaijan State Oil Academy, faculty of economy and organization of the oil and gas industry.

== Career ==
From 1990, he started his diplomatic career as an intern at the International Economic Relations Department in the Ministry of Foreign Affairs of the Republic of Azerbaijan.

In 1992–1996, he worked as an attache in the Republic of Azerbaijan's embassy to the Federal Republic of Germany. In 1996–2001, he served as second secretary, first secretary, head of the division, and deputy head of Department for Europe, the United States of America, and Canada of the Ministry of Foreign Affairs of the Republic of Azerbaijan.

In 2001–2005, he served as the counselor and, later, the chargé d'affaires of the Embassy of the Republic of Azerbaijan to the Republic of Austria.

In 2005, he was a chairman of the Forum for Security Cooperation of the OSCE.

In 2005, he was appointed as the Ambassador Extraordinary and Plenipotentiary of the Republic of Azerbaijan to the Federal Republic of Germany and worked in this position for 11 years till 2016.

From 2016 to 2017, he served as the ambassador at large of the Ministry of Foreign Affairs of the Republic of Azerbaijan.

On October 12, 2017, he was appointed the Minister of Energy of the Republic of Azerbaijan.

He is fluent in Azerbaijani (native), Russian, English, and German.

== See also ==
- Cabinet of Azerbaijan
- Petroleum industry in Azerbaijan
- Southern Gas Corridor
