= Bukhta-Ilicha =

- Location within Azerbaijan
- Coordinates: 40°21′N 49°50′E
- Country: Azerbaijan
- City: Baku
- Time zone: UTC+4 (AZT)
  - Summer (DST): UTC+5 (AZT)

Bukhta-Ilicha (also, Bukhta-Il’icha) is a village in Baku, Azerbaijan.
