= Eduard Asadov =

Russian poet and writer born in ASSR

Eduard Arkadyevich Asadov
- Asadov in the late 1930s
- Born: September 7, 1923; Merv, Turkestan ASSR, Soviet Union
- Died: April 21, 2004 (aged 80); Odintsovo, Russia
- Occupations: poet, writer

Eduard Arkadyevich Asadov (Russian: Эдуа́рд Арка́дьевич Аса́дов, IPA: [ɨdʊˈart ɐrˈkadʲjɪvʲɪtɕ ɐˈsadəf]; September 7, 1923 – April 21, 2004) was a Russian poet and writer.

Born in the town of Merv, Turkestan ASSR. Both parents were teachers. Father (born 1898) fought Dashnaks in the Caucasus during the Civil War. After his father's death in 1929, Eduard and his mother moved to Sverdlovsk to her father Ivan Kalustovich Kurdov. At the age of 8 Eduard composed his first poem, then entered the Pioneers' Organization and, later, Komsomol. Moved to Moscow in 1939, studied at school No.38 and until finishing in 1941. A week after graduation the USSR entered the Great Patriotic War. Asadov went to the front as a volunteer. As a soldier he was a mortar spotter, then assistant to commander of Katyusha battery at North-Caucasian and 4th Ukrainian Fronts. On the night of May 3–4, 1944 defending Sevastopol he was badly wounded by a shell fragment hitting his face. Hardly conscious he managed to drive his munition truck down to the artillery battery. After continuous treatment in many hospitals surgeons had not managed to save his eyes; to the end of his life he wore a black mask. His memories of those tragic times:

"... What next? Next was hospital and twenty-six days of struggle between life and death. "To be or not to be?" the question was literally as simple as that. Delirious when unconscious, at short times of conscience I dictated postcard messages to mom trying hard to avoid words of dismay. That was really hard time, but youth and life overcame. By the way, there was a long row of hospitals that I went through. From Mamashai I was moved to Saki, then Simferopol, then Kislovodsk Hospital named after 10th Anniversary of October (sanatorium by now) and finally Moscow. Trips, surgeons, scalpels, bandages and the hardest point - doctors' verdict: "You have everything ahead. Everything but the light...". That was what I had to admit, endure and realize and on my own to solve the problem "To be or not to be?" After many sleepless nights when I had to estimate everything and finally answer "Yes!" as to set for myself the greatest and the most important goal and chase it with no way to give up. I got back to poetry. I wrote day and night, before and after the surgery, through thick and thin. Though realizing it was still far from ideal I kept working hard and trying over and over. No matter how strong is the man's will and his commitment to the goal, no matter how great is his effort, the true success is never guaranteed. Poetry, like any kind of arts, requires talent, gift, sense of mission. And it is quite hard to evaluate your own poems because your sight here is the most biased one.... I will never forget that first of May 1948, and the extent of my happiness as I held in my hand an issue of Ogonyok magazine which I bought by the House of Scientists and which had my poems typed on its pages. That's it, MY poems, not anyone else's! Celebrating marchers were passing by me and still I was probably more celebrating than anyone in Moscow!"

In 1946 Eduard entered the Maxim Gorky Literature Institute, from which he graduated with honour in 1951. In the same year his first collection of poems named "Path of Light" was published. Subsequently, Asadov became a member of the Communist Party of the USSR and the Union of Writers. He later lived in the writers' village Krasnovidovo. He died in Odintsovo on 21 April 2004. His tomb is in Moscow's Kuntsevo Cemetery. The poet's will specified that his heart was to be buried in the Sapun Mountain in Sevastopol, but according to representatives of the Sapun Mountain Museum his will was never fulfilled because of the family's objections.
