= Khalil Mammadov =

Soviet Azerbaijani tanker and policeman (1916–1989)

Khalil Mammad oglu Mammadov
- Xəlil Məmməd oğlu Məmmədov
- Born: May 5, 1916; Shusha, Elizavetpol Governorate, Russian Empire
- Died: February 21, 1989 (aged 72); Baku, Azerbaijan SSR, Soviet Union
- Military career
- Allegiance: Soviet Union
- Branch: Red Army
- Service years: 1938–1945
- Rank: Major general (Militsiya)
- Unit: 3rd Tank Brigade
- Conflicts: World War II; Battle of the Caucasus; Battle of the Dnieper; Second Jassy–Kishinev offensive; Budapest offensive; Prague offensive
- Awards: Hero of the Soviet Union; Order of Lenin; Order of the Red Banner; Order of Alexander Nevsky; Order of the Patriotic War, 1st class Order of the Red Banner of Labour; Order of the Red Star (2); Order of the Badge of Honour
- Other work: Minister of Internal Affairs of the Azerbaijan SSR

Khalil Mammad oglu Mammadov (Azerbaijani: Xəlil Məmməd oğlu Məmmədov; 5 May 1916 – 21 February 1989) was an Azerbaijani Militsiya Major general, Hero of the Soviet Union, and Minister of Internal Affairs of the Azerbaijan SSR. Mammadov fought in World War II, eventually becoming a tank battalion commander. He was awarded the title for his actions during the Second Jassy–Kishinev offensive, in which the battalion captured Roman. He retired from the Army postwar with the rank of Major. Mammadov worked in the Azerbaijan SSR Ministry of Internal Affairs and became a Militsiya Major general. Between 1960 and 1965 he served as Minister of Internal Affairs of the Azerbaijan.

== Early life ==
Mammadov was born on 5 May 1916 in Shusha to an artisan family. He received secondary vocational education. Mammadov worked as an engineer at the Kyzyl-Arvat locomotive plant from 1937. He was drafted into the Red Army in 1939. He served with the 122nd Tank Battalion. In 1941, he joined the Communist Party of the Soviet Union.

== World War II ==
Mammadov fought in combat from October 1941. He became a commissar in a tank company. He graduated from the commanders refresher courses (KUKSA) in 1942. Mammadov fought in the capture of Crimea, Ukraine, Romania, Hungary and Austria. In the summer of 1943 Mammadov was appointed commander of the 1st Tank Battalion of the 3rd Tank Brigade of the 23rd Tank Corps.

In August and September 1943, he fought in the Donbas strategic offensive. For his actions Mammadov received the Order of the Red Star on 25 September. In October he fought in the capture of Zaporizhzhia. For his actions he received the Order of Alexander Nevsky on 19 March 1944. In March 1944 Mammadov fought in battles around the Shevchenkhovsky farms. For his actions he received the Order of the Red Banner. He fought in the Second Jassy–Kishinev offensive. On 21 August the battalion crossed the Siret and captured Roman, reportedly capturing three trains and up to 4,000 soldiers. Mammadov was wounded but continued to command. In 15 days of fighting in Romanian territory the battalion reportedly destroyed four tanks, two self-propelled guns, 64 guns, 191 cars, and 108 machine guns, as well as killing 1,375 German soldiers. On 24 March 1945 Mammadov was awarded the title Hero of the Soviet Union and the Order of Lenin.

== Postwar ==
Mammadov retired in 1946 with the rank of Major. Between 1951 and 1952 he was first secretary of the Azizbayov District Party Committee. In 1955, he graduated from the Higher Party School of the Central Committee. He worked in the Azerbaijan SSR Ministry of Internal Affairs. From 1957 he was deputy Minister of Internal Affairs. In 1959 he became first deputy minister. On 23 February he received the rank of Militsiya Commissar 3rd rank. From 3 November 1960 to 5 January 1965 he was the Azerbaijan SSR Minister of Internal Affairs, known after 1962 as the Minister of Public Order. He retired with the ranks of Major general of the Militsiya. From 1971 to 1974 he was chairman of the State Committee for Physical Culture and Sport of Azerbaijan. He lived in Baku and died on 21 February 1989. Mammadov was buried in Baku.

A ship of the Ministry of Merchant Marine was named for Mammadov.
