= Ali Ibrahimov =

Soviet politician (1913–1990)

- Əli İbrahimov

Chairman of the Council of Ministers of the Azerbaijan SSR
- In office April 10, 1970 – January 22, 1981
- Preceded by: Enver Alikhanov
- Succeeded by: Hasan Seyidov

First Deputy Chairman of the Council of Ministers of the Azerbaijan SSR
- In office October 23, 1965 – April 10, 1970
- Preceded by: Asgar Orujov
- Succeeded by: Ismayil Ibrahimov

Personal details
- Born: October 14, 1913 Russian Empire
- Died: April 16, 1990 (aged 76) Baku, Azerbaijan SSR, USSR
- Party: CPSU
- Education: Azerbaijan State Oil and Industry University

Ali Izmailovich Ibrahimov (1 October [O.S. 18 September] 1913 – 16 February 1990) was the chairman of the Council of Ministers of the Azerbaijan Soviet Socialist Republic from 10 April 1970 to 22 January 1981.

In 2013 a Scientific-Theoretical Conference was held at the Ministry of Economy of the Republic of Azerbaijan to mark the 100th anniversary of Ibrahimov's birth.

== See also ==
- Prime Minister of Azerbaijan
