= Houston Advanced Research Center =

U.S. not-for-profit organization

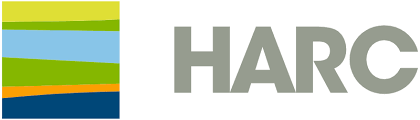
- Company type: Nonprofit
- Industry: Sustainable development Policy analysis Research and development
- Founded: The Woodlands, Texas, U.S. 1982
- Headquarters: The Woodlands, Texas, United States
- Key people: George P. Mitchell, Founder and John Hall, CEO & President
- Revenue: $20 million by 2008
- Number of employees: approximately 26
- Website: harcresearch.org

The Houston Advanced Research Center, commonly referred to as HARC, is a 501(c)(3) not-for-profit organization based in The Woodlands, Texas with the aim of improving human and ecosystem well-being through the application of sustainability science and principles of sustainable development. HARC employs a staff of about 30 researchers and administrators. By 2008, $20 million in revenue is anticipated, mainly from initiatives funded by governmental bodies, foundations, and businesses.

== History ==
After founding The Woodlands in 1974, billionaire philanthropist George P. Mitchell began discussions with local universities including Texas A&M University, Rice University, and the University of Houston in order to establish a center in basic, applied, and policy research. A feasibility study was conducted by Arthur D. Little, Inc., and it was concluded that The Woodlands would be a suitable site for such a facility. Mr. Mitchell then founded the research center in 1982, then named the Houston Area Research Center.

HARC's first research program, a laser study of materials, was sponsored by the Strategic Defense Initiative program in 1983. The following year in 1984, the University of Texas joined the HARC Consortium which already included the original universities that Mr. Mitchell had sought out. In 1985, an act of the Texas Legislature created HARC's Geotechnology Research Institute (GTRI), to improve the technology used in oil and gas exploration. That same year the Center for Global Studies was merged into HARC as an operating division. The Center organized the Woodlands Conferences, managed the Mitchell Prize competition, and developed field work in Houston, the Rio Grande and Northeast Brazil. In 1986, NEC chose HARC for the location of its NEC SX-2, its first supercomputer in North America.

The Houston Area Research Center changed its name to what HARC is presently known to stand for – The Houston Advanced Research Center – in 1990. Construction of HARC's microwave imaging facility was completed the following year. New laboratories were opened for DNA technology and geographical information systems centering on the work of Tim Saldaña. In 1993, HARC researchers in the high-bay test facility set a world record for the highest current through a super-conducting cable. Working together with Varian Instruments, HARC produced the world's first actively shielded magnet for NMR spectroscopy to The University of Texas Medical Branch in Galveston in 1995.

After a review of HARC programs, in 2000 HARC leaders decided to narrow the focus of the organization. HARC was restructured to be an organization dedicated entirely to the application and development of sustainability science at the regional level. Since 2000, HARC's six core programs have grown and its revenues have increased fourfold. In 2005, George P. Mitchell established the Endowment for Regional Sustainability Science, which provides stable income for HARC's continuing operations.

As of 2013, HARC engages in projects that have the intention to help people thrive and nature flourish focusing on the science and engineering needed to understand and address issues related to air quality, clean energy, and water quality and supply.

== Three priorities ==
1. Air
2. Energy
3. Water

=== Air ===
HARC's Air Quality & Climate Program includes air quality research and management, air emission reduction technologies, emissions monitoring technology and policy, and regional impacts of and adaptations to climate change. HARC's air research program is multi-disciplinary, multi-institutional, objective and non-partisan. HARC also serves as Research Management Organization to the Texas Environmental Research Consortium to advise policy decisions regarding air and climate.

=== Energy ===
The mission of the Clean Energy Program is to accelerate development and adoption of clean energy technologies, services, and policies that enhance regional sustainability. The work of the program includes several areas: stationary fuel cells; combined heat and power generation; energy market tools and products; strategic energy planning; clean energy applications analysis; and clean energy policy analysis.

=== Water ===
HARC's Ecosystems and Water Resources Program emphasizes biodiversity, water quality and quantity, ecosystem informatics, economics, policy, and social and institutional analysis. The goal of the program is to link ecosystems and water resources to sustainable development through improved understanding of the interactions between humans and these resources and to facilitate regulatory, institutional and technological change and improved decision making.
