= Elchin Zeynalov =

Azerbaijani wrestling coach

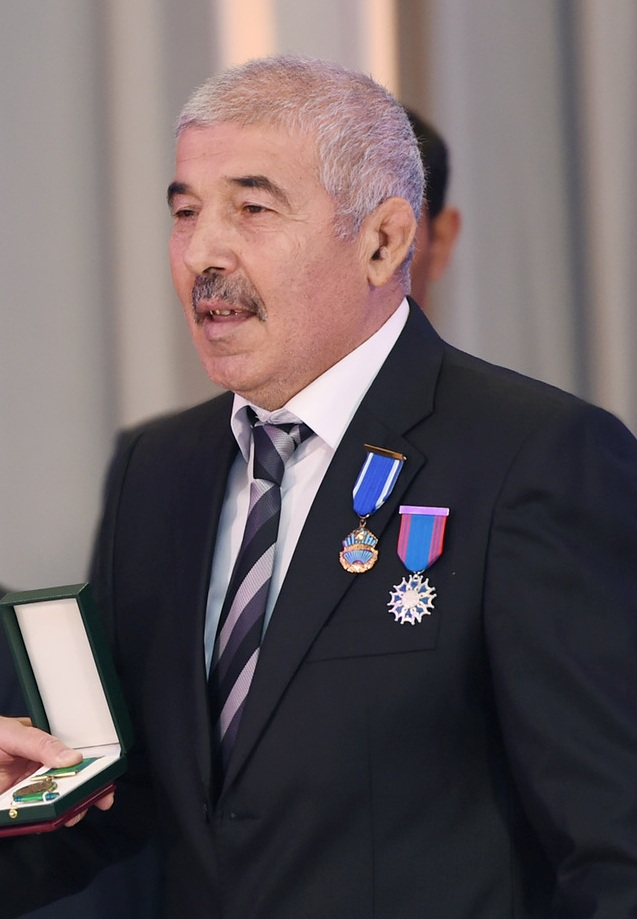

Personal information
- Nationality: Azerbaijan
- Citizenship: Azerbaijani
- Born: 1 April 1948 (age 77) Kirovabad

Sport
- Sport: Freestyle wrestling

Elchin Zeynalov is an Azerbaijani freestyle wrestling coach, Honored coach and Honored Master of Sports of the USSR, Honored Worker of physical culture and sports of Azerbaijan. Personal trainer of Olympic champion Togrul Askerov.

== Biography ==
Elchin Zeynalov was born on April 1, 1948, in the city of Kirovabad (now Ganja). In 1968, he entered the correspondence department of the Kirov Institute of Physical Education.

In 1973, Zeynalov received the title of Master of Sports of the USSR, and in 1989 — Honored Coach of the USSR.

He is currently a freestyle wrestling coach. Many of his students, such as Adil Ibragimov, Riza Khalilov, Vusal Hasanov, Rahim Aliyev, became winners and prize-winners of European championships and World Cups.

By the decree of the President of Azerbaijan dated December 25, 2008, Elchin Zeynalov was awarded the honorary title of "Honored Worker of Physical Culture and Sports"

In 2012, freestyle wrestler Togrul Askerov, whose personal trainer is Zeynalov, became an Olympic champion, in 2015 — the winner of the First European Games, and in 2016 — the silver medalist of the Olympics.

In 2012, Elchin Zeynalov was awarded the Order of Glory for his high achievements at the XXX Summer Olympic Games in London, as well as for his services to the development of Azerbaijani sports.

In 2015, Zeynalov was awarded the Honorary Diploma of the President of the Republic of Azerbaijan for his services to the development of Azerbaijani sports. In 2016, by decree of the President of Azerbaijan, he was awarded the Progress Medal.
