= State Statistics Committee =

Azerbaijan's principal government institution in charge of statistics and census data

State Statistics Committee of the Azerbaijan Republic
- Azərbaycan Respublikası Dövlət Statistika Komitəsi
- Coat of Arms of Azerbaijan

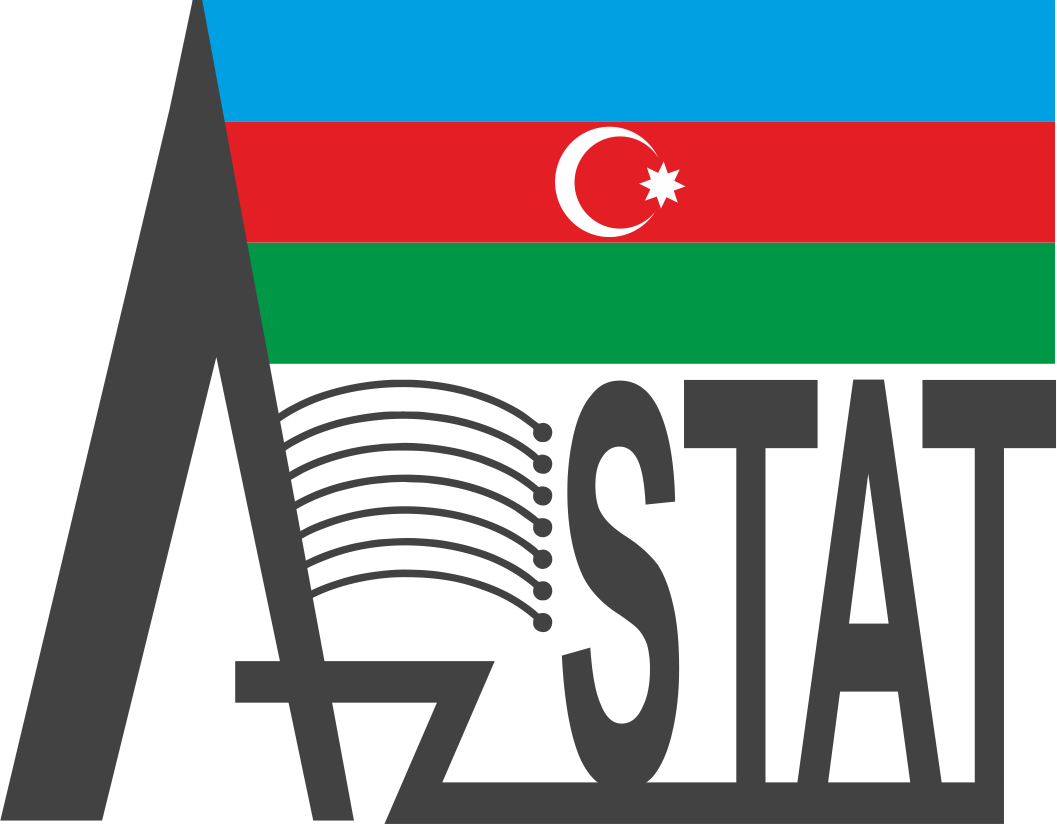
- Logo of the State Statistics Committee

Agency overview
- Formed: February 18, 1994
- Headquarters: 136 Inshaatchilar Avenue, Baku, Azerbaijan Republic AZ1136
- Agency executive: Arif Valiyev, Chairman of State Statistics Committee
- Website: www.stat.gov.az

Building of the State Statistics Committee

The State Statistics Committee of the Azerbaijan Republic (Azerbaijani: Azərbaycan Respublikası Dövlət Statistika Komitəsi) is a governmental agency within the Cabinet of Azerbaijan in charge of collection, processing and disseminating statistical data on the economy, demographics and other sectors of activity in Azerbaijan Republic. The agency was headed by Arif Valiyev.

== History ==
The first statistics offices were founded in Azerbaijan, after it was incorporated into the Russian Empire, initially created and operated in Shamakhi from 1846 through 1859, in Baku from 1859 and in Ganja from 1867. Until 1917, statistical data was given in 20 to 27 tables and contained information on population, labor, job markets, number of factories and plants, agricultural data, prices on commodities, military data, etc.

With the establishment of the Azerbaijan Democratic Republic, the authorities tried to create a centralized office for statistical data collection but succeeded only in the establishment of separate statistics offices within various ministries such as within State Property Ministry on November 15, 1918, and within the Department of Land of the Ministry of Agriculture in July 1919.

After establishment of Soviet rule on July 8, 1920, Nariman Narimanov created an interim collegium of statistics within the Azerbaijan Revolutionary Committee. From 1924 forward, regional statistical bodies were created in each region. In 1928, a new statute was approved by the Council of People's Commissars of the Azerbaijan SSR for creation of the Central Statistics Department. In 1948, the Central Statistics Department was transferred to the Cabinet of Ministers of Azerbaijan. In 1987, the Central Statistics Department was transformed into the State Statistics Committee of the Azerbaijan SSR and its statute was approved by the Council of Ministers in March 1988.

On February 18, 1994, President of independent Azerbaijan, Heydar Aliyev, signed the Law on Statistics establishing the State Statistics Committee of Azerbaijan Republic.

== See also ==
- Cabinet of Azerbaijan
