= Hilal Asadov =

Azerbaijani statesman (born 1908)

Hilal Asadov Hilal Əsədov

Deputy Chairman of the Council of Ministers of the Azerbaijan SSR — Chairman of the State Planning Committee
- In office July 2, 1971 – December 2, 1977
- Preceded by: Mikayil Allahverdiyev
- Succeeded by: Abdulla Gadirov

Minister of the Azerbaijan SSR
- In office March 30, 1963 – September 30, 1963

Personal details
- Born: 1908
- Political party: CPSU
- Education: Azerbaijan Industrial Institute

Hilal Mammad oghlu Asadov (Azerbaijani: Hilal Məmməd oğlu Əsədov, born 1908, date of death unknown) was an Azerbaijani-Soviet statesman, Deputy Chairman of the Council of Ministers of the Azerbaijan SSR — Chairman of the State Planning Committee (1971–1977).

== Biography ==
Hilal Asadov was born in 1908. He graduated from Azerbaijan Industrial Institute.

In the years 1931–1957, he held various positions in the oil industry as an engineer, mine manager, chief engineer, manager in a number of mining trusts, as well as the deputy minister of the oil industry of the Azerbaijan SSR. From 1957, he worked as the deputy chairman of the State Planning Commission (Committee) of the Azerbaijan SSR, and from 1963 as the first deputy. In July 1971, he was appointed Deputy Chairman of the Council of Ministers of the Azerbaijan SSR — Chairman of the State Planning Committee and worked in this position until his retirement in December 1977.

Hilal Asadov was the Chairman of the Presidium of the Azerbaijan Chamber of Commerce, the Chairman of the Council of Scientific and Technical Societies of Azerbaijan. He was elected a deputy of the Supreme Soviet of the Azerbaijan SSR of the 7th-9th convocation, and became a member of the Central Committee of the Communist Party of Azerbaijan.
