= Rafael Asadov =

Azerbaijani soldier (b. 1952, d. 1992)

- Born: Rafael; October 27, 1952; Ganja, Azerbaijan SSR, USSR
- Died: November 12, 1992 (aged 40); Agstafa District, Azerbaijan
- Military career
- Awards: National Hero of Azerbaijan; 1994

Rafael Asadov (Rafael Avaz oglu Asadov; 1952, in Ganja – 1992, in Agstafa District) was a National Hero of Azerbaijan.

== Early life ==
Asadov was born on October 27, 1952, in Ganja. After graduating high school in 1969, he entered Tbilisi Art School. After graduating from a military school in 1973, he continued his education at Saint Petersburg Ngabi Artillery Academy. He served in the Armed Forces of the USSR in Hungary, Vietnam and Afghanistan.

In 1991, Asadov was an active participant in military operations in Aghdam, Goranboy, Tovuz and Gadabay regions.

== Private life ==
He was married. Two children have been left behind. He was killed on November 12, 1992, while overseeing combat positions in preparation for the operation in the Agstafa region. He was buried in the Alley of Martyrs in Baku.

== Recognition ==
After his death, he was named a National Hero of Azerbaijan by Decree No. 202 on September 16, 1994.
