= Hijran Sharifov =

Azerbaijani wrestling coach

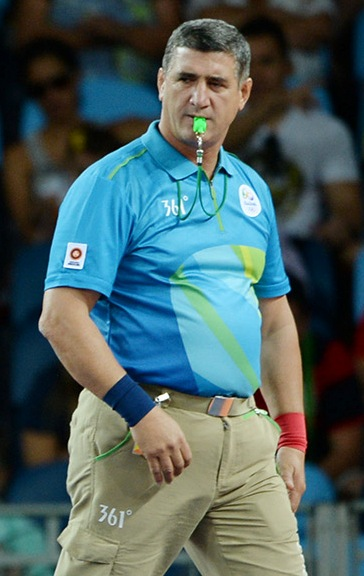
- Sharifov at the 2016 Summer Olympics

Personal information
- Nationality: Azerbaijan
- Citizenship: Azerbaijani
- Born: 1 August 1965 (age 60) Baku

Sport
- Sport: Wrestling

Hijran Sharifov (Azerbaijani: Hicran Şərifov; born 1 August 1965) is an Azerbaijani wrestling referee and coach, Master of Sports in Greco-Roman wrestling, Honored Coach of the Republic of Azerbaijan, international referee, holder of the Order of Glory and the Progress Medal, winner of the Golden Whistle of the 2012 Olympic Games in London.

== Biography ==
Hijran Sharifov was born on 1 August 1965, in the village of Amirajany in Baku. Hijran has five brothers and four sisters. At first, he studied at the eight-year school No. 97, after which he continued his education at school No. 114. After graduation, he entered the Azerbaijan Institute of Petroleum and Chemistry named after M. Azizbekov, from which he graduated in 1992.

From October 1984 to December 1986, Sharifov served in Leningrad. He was a driver of military equipment and an armored personnel carrier, and also learned to drive a tank. Before joining the army, he was engaged in Greco-Roman wrestling, participated in youth tournaments.

From 1987 to 1993, Hijran Sharifov worked as an electrician at the Surakhani Machine-building Plant. Since 1993, he has been an employee of the Ministry of Internal Affairs of Azerbaijan. From 1994 to August 2000, he worked as a junior inspector for the inspection department in the Air Transport Police Department of the Ministry of Internal Affairs. In 1997, Sharifov was awarded the title of Master of sports in Greco-Roman wrestling, and in 2000 — the rank of police lieutenant, after which he began working as the head of a Sports recreation complex at the Police Academy of the Ministry of Internal Affairs.

Since 1999, Sharifov has been a coach-teacher in the Public Association "Neftchi Sports Club". In 2000, he entered the Police Academy of the Ministry of Internal Affairs, from which he graduated in 2005 (Faculty of Law). Currently holds the rank of Colonel-Lieutenant of the police.

Sharifov's ward Rovshan Bayramov became the world champion and twice the Olympic medalist (in 2008 and 2012), Elman Mukhtarov won the Youth Olympic Games and became the winners of the European Games in 2015, and Elnur Hasanov became the world champion among juniors.

In 2008, Hijran Sharifov was awarded the Progress medal for his high achievements at the XXIX Summer Olympic Games in Beijing, as well as for his merits in the development of Azerbaijani sports, and in 2012, the Order of Glory for his high achievements at the XXX Summer Olympic Games in London, as well as for his merits in the development of Azerbaijani sports. In 2015, Sharifov was awarded the Honorary Diploma of the President of the Republic of Azerbaijan for his services to the development of Azerbaijani sports.

== Judging ==
Hijran Sharifov has judged matches at three Olympic Games, more than 30 World Championships and 40 European Championships (as of October 2016).

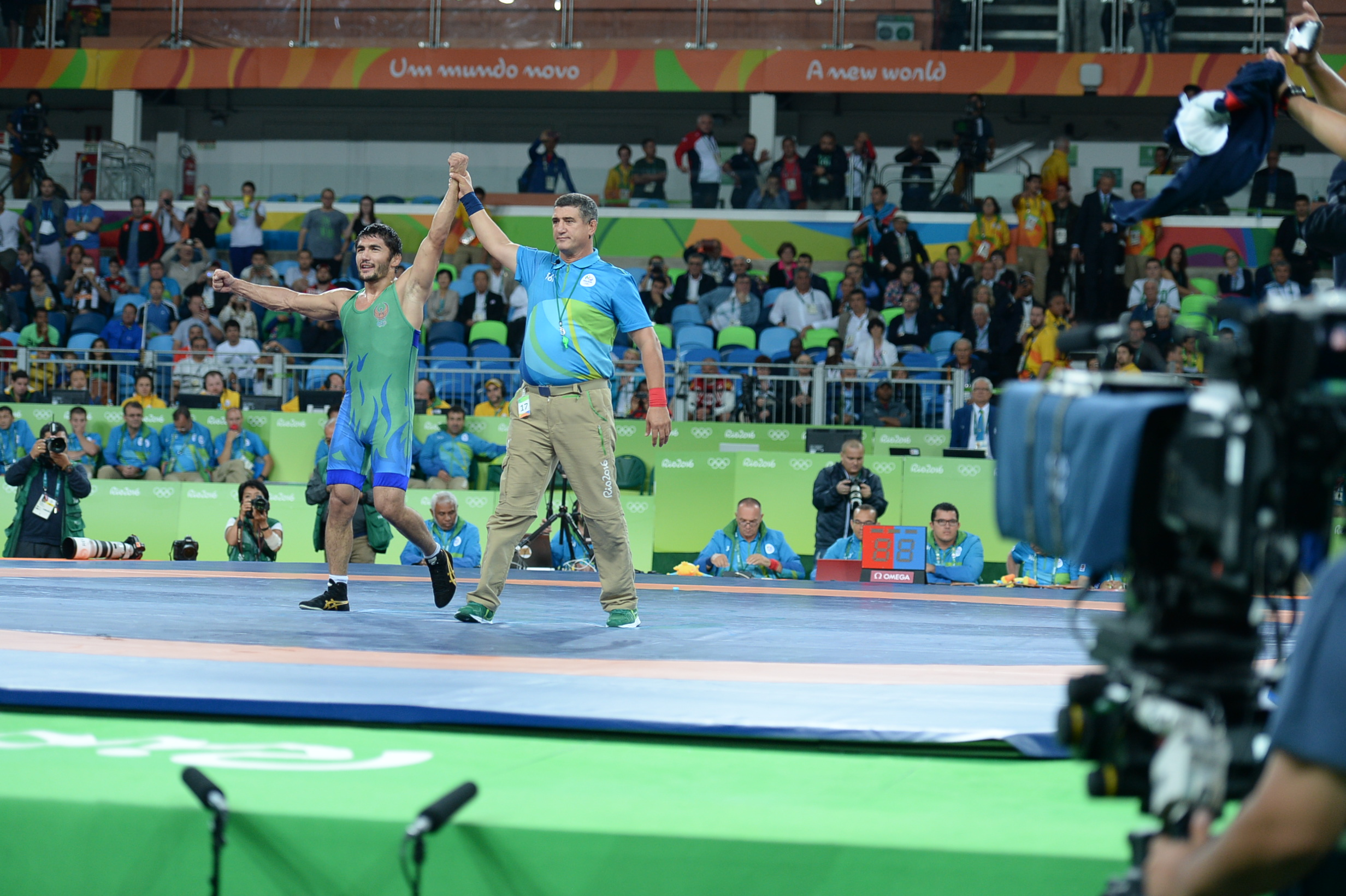
Sharifov announces the victory of Ihtiyor Novruzov at the 2016 Olympic Games. His rival from Mongolia refused to attend the winner's announcement ceremony in protest

At the 2012 Olympic Games in London, Hijran Sharifov was selected by the International Wrestling Federation as one of the three best referees of the Olympics and awarded the Golden Whistle.

In 2016, Sharifov judged the meetings at the Olympic Games in Rio de Janeiro. Among them is the infamous duel between Mandakhnaran Ganzorig from Mongolia and Ihtiyor Novruzov from Uzbekistan for the bronze medal. Leading with a score of 7:6, Ganzorig in the last seconds of the meeting began to celebrate the victory and evade the fight, for which Sharifov awarded Novruzov one point and the victory went to the Uzbek athlete. In protest against the refereeing, the coaches of the Mongolian wrestler went to the carpet and began to undress, and after watching the replay, Novruzov's victory was confirmed. In September 2016, the American website Flowrestling.org He published an article in which he accused the chief judge of the United Wrestling Organization Antonio Silvestri of helping the wrestlers of Azerbaijan, Russia and Uzbekistan at the 2016 Olympics to reach the final with the help of referees from these countries. Hijran Sharifov, in particular, was accused of the fact that wrestlers from Russia and Uzbekistan took part in half of the fights that he judged, as well as the fact that he judged 14% of all meetings of Russian athletes.

Sharifov categorically denied all the accusations, saying that Silvestri appointed judges to the competition, guided only by their work experience. The president of the Russian Wrestling Federation Mikhail Mamiashvili, calling the accusations "dirty actions of journalists," said that conclusions in wrestling, as in any other sport, "should be given by independent professionals who understand the nuances and details," and journalists are not specialists.
