= Burastan =

Burastan Բուրաստան
- Location within Armenia Location within Ararat
- Coordinates: 39°59′N 44°30′E
- Country: Armenia
- Province: Ararat
- Municipality: Artashat

Population (2015)
  - Total: 2,867
- Time zone: UTC+4
  - Summer (DST): UTC+5

Burastan (Armenian: Բուրաստան) is a village in the Artashat Municipality of the Ararat Province of Armenia.
