= Ministry of Energy (Azerbaijan) =

Ministry of Energy of Azerbaijan Republic
- Azərbaycan Respublikasının Energetika Nazirliyi

Agency overview
- Formed: April 18, 2001
- Jurisdiction: Government of Azerbaijan
- Headquarters: 88 H.Zardabi Street, Baku, Azerbaijan Republic AZ1012
- Agency executive: Parviz Shahbazov, Minister of Energy
- Website: www.mie.gov.az

The Ministry of Energy of the Azerbaijan Republic (Azerbaijani: Azərbaycan Respublikasının Energetika Nazirliyi) is a governmental agency within the Cabinet of Azerbaijan in charge of regulating the activities in the industry of production and energy sector of Azerbaijan Republic. The ministry is headed by Parviz Shahbazov.

== History ==
The ministry was established according to Presidential Decree No. 458 on April 18, 2001. The functions and obligations of the ministry were stipulated in Presidential Decree No. 575 dated September 6, 2001. The ministry's statute was approved by the Azerbaijani Parliament on May 15, 2006. Later, on 22 October 2013, this ministry was liquidated, and its function was passed to the Ministry of Energy established on the same date according to Presidential Order No. 3. Regulations of the Ministry of Energy of Azerbaijan were approved according to Presidential Decree No. 149 on 11 April 2014.

== Structure ==
The ministry regulates the activities in the production and energy production complex. These activities include upstream and downstream activities, exploration, and development of fields, operations of oil and gas refineries, power and heat generation, supply and distribution through the networks, and so forth. The State Oil Company of Azerbaijan (SOCAR), Azerkimya State Company, Azerigas Company, Azerenerji JSC, and Azneftkimyamash JSC are all part of the complex. On January 11, 2018, structural changes were conducted in the Ministry of Energy to optimize the administration. New departments and divisions were established, among them the Oil Chemistry Department and the Internal Control Department. Also, several other departments were reorganized.

The Ministry of Industry and Energy of Azerbaijan Republic has agreements and cooperates with European Energy Charter, Organization of the Black Sea Economic Cooperation, Executive Committee of the CIS Energy Council, Organization for Economic Cooperation, US Agency for International Development, European Commission of European Union (INOGATE, TACIS, TRACECA), UN Economic Commission for Europe (UNECE), International Atomic Energy Agency, Coordination Council for the development of oil transportation corridor within the framework of GUAM, World Trade Organization, Work Group for cooperation with NATO, Special Work Group of the UN Economic and Social Council, International Monetary Fund, World Bank, European Bank for Reconstruction and Development, German KFW Bank, Islamic Development Bank, Asia Development Bank, Japanese Bank for International Cooperation.

== Cooperation with other countries ==
=== Germany ===
The Ministry of Energy of Azerbaijan held a meeting with the Eastern Committee of the German economy on 13 February 2018. Parviz Shahbazov mentioned that the history of economic and cultural cooperation of Azerbaijan with Germany started 200 years ago when the Germans from Vurtemberg moved to Azerbaijan. Also, he noted that more than 200 Germany-based firms operate in Azerbaijan. “Uniper” company plays a role in the development of this cooperation too. It is also one of the companies that is going to buy gas from Shahdeniz Stage 2 Azerbaijan and Germany are going to exploit the alternative energy to strengthen economic relations.

=== Saudi Arabia ===
On 16 January 2018, a delegation from Azerbaijan led by Parviz Shahbazov visited Saudi Arabia. The delegation of Azerbaijan had a meeting with Salman bin Abdulaziz al-Saud, during which cooperation in the energy sector was discussed. Khalid Abdulaziz Al Falih, Minister of Energy, Industry and Natural Resources, said that the branch of the Saudi Aramco company would operate in Azerbaijan.

=== Czech Republic ===
Azerbaijan and the Czech Republic are currently working on a new inter-ministerial energy agreement. “The essence of the document is to underline the strategic importance of supplies of Azerbaijani oil to the Czech Republic but also to facilitate the cooperation in the development of alternative energy sources (e.g., the hydropower and other green energy sources) and create conditions for the involvement of entrepreneurial subjects in energy projects in both countries,” Thomas Huner, Czech Minister for Industry and Trade, said. Azerbaijani oil represents one-third of oil consumption in the Czech Republic.

== Southern Gas Corridor ==
Due to the Southern gas corridor, gas will be transported from the Caspian region to Europe. The main source of gas will be Shah Deniz Stage 2. The Ministry of Energy of Azerbaijan cooperates with BP for the realization of this project in the Caspian Region. First, gas will be supplied to Georgia and Turkey in 2018. Thereafter, in 2020, gas is expected to be delivered to Europe.

== See also ==
- Cabinet of Azerbaijan
- Petroleum industry in Azerbaijan
- Southern Gas Corridor
