= Enver Alikhanov =

Soviet politician

Enver Alikhanov (Azerbaijani: Ənvər Əlixanov; 30 April 1917, in Baku – 31 July 1992) was the chairman of the Council of Ministers of the Azerbaijan Soviet Socialist Republic from 29 December 1961 to 10 April 1970. A monument to Alikhanov exists in Baku, Azerbaijan.

== See also ==
- Prime Minister of Azerbaijan
