= List of heads of state of Azerbaijan =

This is the list of the heads of state of Azerbaijan from 1918 to the present. 25 people have been head of the Azerbaijani state since its establishment in 1918. It includes leaders of short-lived Azerbaijan Democratic Republic (1918–1920), of Soviet Azerbaijan (1920–1991), and of post-Soviet era.

Multiple terms in office, consecutive or otherwise, are listed and counted in the first column (administration number) and the second column counts individuals.

The youngest head of state by his accession to office was Grigory Kaminsky, at age 25, and the oldest Heydar Aliyev, at age 70.

== Leaders of Azerbaijan since 1918 ==
Colour key
(for political parties)
None
Musavat
Ittifaq al-Muslimin
Communist Party of the Soviet Union (Bolsheviks)
Communist Party of the Soviet Union
New Azerbaijan Party
Azerbaijani Popular Front Party

=== Azerbaijan Democratic Republic (1918–1920) ===
==== Chairman of the Azerbaijani National Council ====
No.	President (birth–death)		Term of office			Political party	Government	Elected	Ref
No.	Portrait	Name	Took office	Left office	Time in office	Political party	Government	Elected	Ref
1		Mammad Amin Rasulzade; Məmməd Əmin Rəsulzadə (1884–1955)	28 May 1918	7 December 1918	193 days	Musavat	1. Rasulzade I	1918	
1		Mammad Amin Rasulzade; Məmməd Əmin Rəsulzadə (1884–1955)	Regarded as the first President in the modern sense; won the Battle of Baku; remained neutral on the Russian Civil War; established Azerbaijani Armed Forces.						

==== Chairman of Parliament ====
No.	Chairman of Parliament (birth–death)		Term of office			Political party	Government	Elected	Ref
No.	Portrait	Name	Took office	Left office	Time in office	Political party	Government	Elected	Ref
2		Alimardan Topchubashov; Əlimərdan Topçubaşov (1862–1934)	7 December 1918	27 April 1920	1 year, 142 days	Ittifaq al-Muslimin	2. Topchubashov I	1918	
2		Alimardan Topchubashov; Əlimərdan Topçubaşov (1862–1934)	Achieved the de facto recognition of the Azerbaijan Democratic Republic.						

=== Transcaucasian Socialist Federative Soviet Republic (1922–1936) and Azerbaijan Soviet Socialist Republic (1936–1991) ===
==== Chairman of the Presidium of the Communist Party of Azerbaijan SSR ====
No.	Chairman (birth–death)		Term of office			Political party	Government	Elected	Ref
No.	Portrait	Name	Took office	Left office	Time in office	Political party	Government	Elected	Ref
3		Mirza Davud Huseynov; Mirzə Davud Hüseynov (1894–1938)	28 April 1920	23 July 1920	86 days	Communist (Bolsheviks)	3. Hüseynov I	—	
3		Mirza Davud Huseynov; Mirzə Davud Hüseynov (1894–1938)	During the Great Purge, he was arrested, accused of plotting against the Soviet state, sentenced to death and executed.						
4		Victor Naneyshvili; Viktor Naneyşvili (1878–1940)	23 July 1920	9 September 1920	48 days	Communist (Bolsheviks)	4. Naneyşvili I	—	
4		Victor Naneyshvili; Viktor Naneyşvili (1878–1940)	During the Great Purge, he was arrested, accused of plotting against the Soviet state, sentenced to death and executed.						
5		Elena Stasova; Yelena Stasova (1873–1966)	9 September 1920	15 September 1920	6 days	Communist (Bolsheviks)	5. Stasova I	—	
5		Elena Stasova; Yelena Stasova (1873–1966)	Shortest serving leader of communist Azerbaijan						
6		Vladimir Dumbadze; Vladimir Dumbadze (1879–1934)	15 September 1920	24 November 1920	70 days	Communist (Bolsheviks)	6. Dumbadze I	—	
6		Vladimir Dumbadze; Vladimir Dumbadze (1879–1934)	During the Great Purge, he was arrested, accused of plotting against the Soviet state, sentenced to death and executed.						

==== Executive Secretary of the Communist Party of Azerbaijan SSR ====
No.	Secretary (birth–death)		Term of office			Political party	Government	Elected	Ref
No.	Portrait	Name	Took office	Left office	Time in office	Political party	Government	Elected	Ref
7		Grigory Kaminsky; Qriqori Kaminski (1895–1938)	24 October 1920	24 July 1921	273 days	Communist (Bolsheviks)	7. Kaminski I	—	
7		Grigory Kaminsky; Qriqori Kaminski (1895–1938)	During the Great Purge, he was arrested, accused of plotting against the Soviet state, sentenced to death and executed.						

==== First Secretary of the Communist Party of Azerbaijan SSR ====
No.	First Secretary (birth–death)		Term of office			Political party	Government	Ref
No.	Portrait	Name	Took office	Left office	Time in office	Political party	Government	Ref
8		Sergey Kirov; Sergey Kirov (1886–1934)	24 July 1921	5 January 1925	3 years, 165 days	Communist (Bolsheviks)	8. Kirov I	
8		Sergey Kirov; Sergey Kirov (1886–1934)	Enforced Soviet rule over unwilling Azerbaijani nationalists; played an important role in helping to deliver Baku's oil to Soviet Russia.					
9		Ruhulla Akhundov; Ruhulla Axundov (1897–1938)	5 January 1925	21 January 1926	1 year, 16 days	Communist (Bolsheviks)	9. Axundov I	
9		Ruhulla Akhundov; Ruhulla Axundov (1897–1938)	During the Great Purge, he was arrested, accused of plotting against the Soviet state, sentenced to death and executed.					
10		Levon Mirzoyan; Levon Mirzoyan (1887–1939)	21 January 1926	11 July 1929	3 years, 171 days	Communist (Bolsheviks)	10. Mirzoyan I	
10		Levon Mirzoyan; Levon Mirzoyan (1887–1939)	Purged Azerbaijani intelligentsia, communist leaders who had sympathized with the opposition or who might have once leaned toward Pan-Turkism.					
11		Nikolay Gikalo; Nikolay Gikalo (1897–1938)	11 July 1929	5 August 1930	1 year, 25 days	Communist (Bolsheviks)	11. Gikalo I	
11		Nikolay Gikalo; Nikolay Gikalo (1897–1938)	During the Great Purge, he was arrested, accused of plotting against the Soviet state, sentenced to death and executed.					
12		Vladimir Polonsky; Vladimir Polonski (1893–1937)	5 August 1930	7 February 1933	2 years, 186 days	Communist (Bolsheviks)	12. Polonski I	
12		Vladimir Polonsky; Vladimir Polonski (1893–1937)	During the Great Purge, he was arrested, accused of plotting against the Soviet state, sentenced to death and executed.					
13		Ruben Rubenov; Ruben Rubenov (1894–1937)	7 February 1933	10 December 1933	306 days	Communist (Bolsheviks)	13. Rubenov I	
13		Ruben Rubenov; Ruben Rubenov (1894–1937)	During the Great Purge, he was arrested, accused of plotting against the Soviet state, sentenced to death and executed.					
14		Mir Jafar Baghirov; Mir Cəfər Bağırov (1896–1956)	10 December 1933	6 April 1953	19 years, 117 days	Communist	14. Bağırov I	
14		Mir Jafar Baghirov; Mir Cəfər Bağırov (1896–1956)	Followed Stalin's orders without question; Purged Azerbaijani intelligentsia, communist leaders who had sympathized with the opposition or who might have once leaned toward Pan-Turkism.					
15		Mir Teymur Yaqubov; Mir Teymur Yaqubov (1904–1970)	6 April 1953	17 February 1954	317 days	Communist	15. Yaqubov I	
16		Imam Mustafayev; Imam Mustafayev (1910–1997)	17 February 1954	10 July 1959	5 years, 143 days	Communist	16. Mustafayev I	
16		Imam Mustafayev; Imam Mustafayev (1910–1997)	Restored Azerbaijani language as the official language of the Azerbaijan SSR.					
17		Vali Akhundov; Vəli Axundov (1916–1986)	10 July 1959	14 July 1969	10 years, 4 days	Communist	17. Axundov I	
17		Vali Akhundov; Vəli Axundov (1916–1986)	He is credited in Azerbaijan for rebuffing the Armenian claims for Nagorno-Karabakh Autonomous Oblast in 1965.					
18		Heydar Aliyev; Heydər Əliyev (1923–2003)	14 July 1969	3 December 1982	13 years, 142 days	Communist	18. H.Əliyev I	
18		Heydar Aliyev; Heydər Əliyev (1923–2003)	Temporarily improved economic conditions and promoted alternative industries to the declining oil industry.					
19		Kamran Baghirov; Kamran Bağırov (1933–2000)	3 December 1982	21 May 1988	5 years, 170 days	Communist	19. Bağırov I	
19		Kamran Baghirov; Kamran Bağırov (1933–2000)	He was strongly criticized for worsening economic conditions in Azerbaijan.					
20		Abdurrahman Vazirov; Əbdürrəhman Vəzirov (1930–2022)	21 May 1988	25 January 1990	1 year, 249 days	Communist	20. Vəzirov I	
20		Abdurrahman Vazirov; Əbdürrəhman Vəzirov (1930–2022)	Shared internationalist values and aspirations for political reform but he could not cope effectively with the complex political situation in Azerbaijan.					
21		Ayaz Mutallibov; Ayaz Mütəllibov (1938–2022)	25 January 1990	14 September 1991	1 year, 232 days	Communist	21. Mütəllibov I	
21		Ayaz Mutallibov; Ayaz Mütəllibov (1938–2022)	Black January.					

=== Republic of Azerbaijan (1991–present) ===
No.	President (birth–death)		Term of office			Elected	Political party	Government	Ref
No.	Portrait	Name	Took office	Left office	Time in office	Elected	Political party	Government	Ref
(21)		Ayaz Mutallibov; Azerbaijani: Ayaz Mütəllibov (1938–2022)	18 May 1990	6 March 1992	1 year, 293 days	1990	Communist	22. Mütəllibov II	
(21)		Ayaz Mutallibov; Azerbaijani: Ayaz Mütəllibov (1938–2022)	8 September 1991	6 March 1992	1 year, 293 days	1991	Communist	22. Mütəllibov II	
(21)		Ayaz Mutallibov; Azerbaijani: Ayaz Mütəllibov (1938–2022)	First Nagorno-Karabakh War; Khojaly Massacre; Capture of Shusha; 1991 Azerbaijani Mil Mi-8 shootdown. Forced to submit his resignation after pressure from Azerbaijan Popular Front.						
—		Yagub Mammadov (acting); Azerbaijani: Yaqub Məmmədov (born 1941)	6 March 1992	14 May 1992	69 days	—	None	—	
—		Yagub Mammadov (acting); Azerbaijani: Yaqub Məmmədov (born 1941)	Ousted by the armed revolt led by Azerbaijan Popular Front.						
(21)		Ayaz Mutallibov; Azerbaijani: Ayaz Mütəllibov (1938–2022)	14 May 1992	18 May 1992	4 days	—	None	Mütəllibov II	
(21)		Ayaz Mutallibov; Azerbaijani: Ayaz Mütəllibov (1938–2022)	Deposed from his duty after takeover by Azerbaijan Popular Front.						
—		Isa Gambar (acting); Azerbaijani: İsa Qəmbər (born 1957)	18 May 1992	17 June 1992	30 days	—	Musavat	—	
—		Isa Gambar (acting); Azerbaijani: İsa Qəmbər (born 1957)	Took temporary duties of president until the national elections in 1992.						
22		Abulfaz Elchibey; Azerbaijani: Əbülfəz Elçibəy (1938–2000)	17 June 1992	24 June 1993	1 year, 7 days	1992	Azerbaijani Popular Front Party	23. Elçibəy I	
22		Abulfaz Elchibey; Azerbaijani: Əbülfəz Elçibəy (1938–2000)	Among the Soviet republics the Russian army was first withdrawn from Azerbaijan; The national currency of Azerbaijan was put into circulation; State Treasure Foundation was established; Entrance examinations to the high and vocational educational was held with test method for the first time; The foundation of private institutions in the education field was permitted; The passage to the Latin alphabet; Founded the SOCAR; Re-established Azerbaijani Armed Forces; Operation Goranboy.						
—		Heydar Aliyev; Azerbaijani: Heydər Əliyev (1923–2003)	24 June 1993	10 October 1993	10 years, 129 days	—	New Azerbaijan Party	24. H.Əliyev II	
(18)		Heydar Aliyev; Azerbaijani: Heydər Əliyev (1923–2003)	10 October 1993	3 October 2003	10 years, 129 days	1993	New Azerbaijan Party	24. H.Əliyev II	
(18)		Heydar Aliyev; Azerbaijani: Heydər Əliyev (1923–2003)	3 October 1998	31 October 2003	10 years, 129 days	1998	New Azerbaijan Party	24. H.Əliyev II	
(18)		Heydar Aliyev; Azerbaijani: Heydər Əliyev (1923–2003)	Founded the YAP; Heydar Aliyev's cult of personality; Baku–Tbilisi–Ceyhan pipeline; South Caucasus Pipeline; 1994 Baku Metro bombings. Survived coup attempt in 1995.						
23		Ilham Aliyev; Azerbaijani: İlham Əliyev (born 1961)	31 October 2003	15 October 2008	22 years, 361 days	2003	New Azerbaijan Party	25. İ.Əliyev I	
23		Ilham Aliyev; Azerbaijani: İlham Əliyev (born 1961)	15 October 2008	9 October 2013	22 years, 361 days	2008	New Azerbaijan Party	25. İ.Əliyev I	
23		Ilham Aliyev; Azerbaijani: İlham Əliyev (born 1961)	9 October 2013	11 April 2018	22 years, 361 days	2013	New Azerbaijan Party	25. İ.Əliyev I	
23		Ilham Aliyev; Azerbaijani: İlham Əliyev (born 1961)	11 April 2018	7 February 2024	22 years, 361 days	2018	New Azerbaijan Party	25. İ.Əliyev I	
23		Ilham Aliyev; Azerbaijani: İlham Əliyev (born 1961)	7 February 2024	Incumbent	22 years, 361 days	2024	New Azerbaijan Party	25. İ.Əliyev I	
23		Ilham Aliyev; Azerbaijani: İlham Əliyev (born 1961)	Azerbaijan was elected as a non-permanent member to United Nations Security Council; foiled 2007 Baku terrorist plot; Azerbaijan State Oil Academy shooting; 2010 Mardakert skirmishes; 2011 Azerbaijani protests; Eurovision Song Contest 2012; 2013 Baku protests; 2014 Armenian–Azerbaijani clashes; 2014 Nagorno-Karabakh Mil Mi-24 shootdown; 2015 European Games; 2016 Nagorno-Karabakh clashes; Baku City Circuit; 2017 Islamic Solidarity Games; 2017 Islamic Solidarity Games; Convention on the legal status of the Caspian Sea; 2019 Baku protests; 2020 Armenian–Azerbaijani clashes; 2020 Nagorno-Karabakh conflict. Survived coup attempt in 2025.						

== See also ==
- President of Azerbaijan
- Prime Minister of Azerbaijan
