= Kubra Farajova =

Soviet-Azerbaijani politician

Kubra Yahya kyzy Farajeva
- Kübra Yəhya qızı Fərəcova
- Born: May 16, 1907; Quba, Baku province, Azerbaijan Soviet Socialist Republic
- Died: October 1998
- Occupations: Politician, pediatrician
- Years active: 1932–1988
- Political party: Communist Party of the Soviet Union
- Awards: Badge of Excellence in Health of the USSR

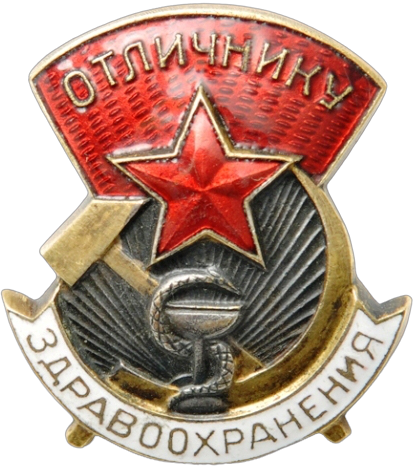
The Soviet Union badge "Excellence in Healthcare of the USSR", which Farajeva received in 1964 due to her service as a pediatrician.

Kübra Yahya kyzy Farajeva (Azerbaijani: Kübra Yəhya qızı Fərəcova, 16 May 1907 – October 1988) was a Soviet-Azerbaijani physician and politician.

She served as Minister of Health from 1947–1950.

== Biography ==
Farajeva was born in Quba in Baku province in 1907. She was a member of the All-Union Communist Party of the Bolsheviks.

She was involved in economic, public, and political work since 1938.

From 1938 to 1980, she was the Deputy People's Commissar of Health of the Azerbaijan SSR, the instructor of the Central Committee of the Communist Party of Azerbaijan. She was Acting Secretary then Secretary of the Presidium of the Supreme Soviet of the Azerbaijan SSR. Later, she became the Minister of Health of the Azerbaijan SSR and the Director of the N. K. Krupskaya Research Institute of Maternity and Childhood Protection in the Azerbaijan SSR.

She was elected to the position of 2nd convocation Deputy of the Supreme Soviet of the USSR.

She died in 1988 in Baku, Azerbaijan.

== Honors ==
Farajeva received the Order of the Badge of Honour on February 25, 1946. She received the Badge of Excellence in Healthcare of the USR in 1964. She has received the Order of the Red Banner of Labour.

== Memorialization ==
The name Kübra Farajeva was given to the Baku Research Institute of Pediatrics.
