= Boyuk Aghayev =

Azerbaijani politician

Boyuk Aghayev Böyük Ağayev

Minister of Health of the Azerbaijan SSR
- In office February 1, 1958 – May 4, 1963
- Preceded by: Vali Akhundov
- Succeeded by: Fakhri Vakilov

Personal details
- Born: December 10, 1907 Shusha, Shusha uezd, Elizavetpol Governorate, Russian Empire
- Died: October 18, 1965 (aged 57) Baku, Azerbaijan SSR, USSR
- Resting place: Alley of Honor
- Party: CPSU
- Awards: Order of Lenin Medal "For the Victory over Germany in the Great Patriotic War 1941–1945"

Military service
- Rank: senior lieutenant

Boyuk Mammad oghlu Aghayev (Azerbaijani: Böyük Məmməd oğlu Ağayev, December 10, 1907–October 18, 1965) was an Azerbaijani doctor and statesman, Minister of Health of the Azerbaijan SSR (1958–1963), Rector of the Azerbaijan State Institute for the Advancement of Doctors (1963–1965).

== Biography ==
Boyuk Aghayev was born in 1907 in the city of Shusha. At the age of 14, he entered the Shusha Teachers Seminary, and after five years, he started teaching in one of the rural schools of Shemakha uezd. Later, he worked as an inspector of the public education department of the Shirvan district and head of the public education department of Gutgashen district. In the same years, he received higher pedagogical education by correspondence and graduated from the Azerbaijan Pedagogical Institute in 1935, and in 1942 he graduated from the Faculty of Treatment and Prevention of the Azerbaijan State Medical Institute.

After finishing his education, Boyuk Aghayev worked as a doctor-malariologist at the sanatorium-epidemiological station in Goychay, and became the head of the tropical station in Kurdamir. In 1948–1953, he worked as the chief supervisor of the Ministry of State Control of the Azerbaijan SSR, from April 1953 as the Deputy Minister of Health of the Azerbaijan SSR, and from February 1958 as the Minister of Health of the Azerbaijan SSR. From May 1963 until the end of his life, he was the director of the Azerbaijan State Institute for the Advancement of Doctors.

Boyuk Aghayev, who was admitted to the membership of the Communist Party of Azerbaijan since 1942, was a candidate for the membership of the Central Committee of the Communist Party of Azerbaijan. He was elected a deputy of the 5th convocation of the Supreme Soviet of the Azerbaijan SSR, as well as of the Baku City Council of Working People's Deputies. He was awarded the Order of Lenin (1961) and medals of the USSR.

Boyuk Aghayev died in 1965 in Baku.
