= Movsum Kadyrli =

Movsum Nadzhmetdinovich Kadyrli (1893-1937) was an Azerbaijani revolutionary active in the Communist Party of Azerbaijan. He was also known as Israfilbekov.

On 28 November 1921, Movsum Kadyrli joined the Council of People's Commissars of Azerbaijan as People’s Commissar of Health of the AzSSR. He replaced Ağahüseyn Kazımov and held this position until January 21, 1935.
