= Mir Teymur Yagubov =

Azerbaijani politician (1904–1970)

- Mir Teymur Yaqubov
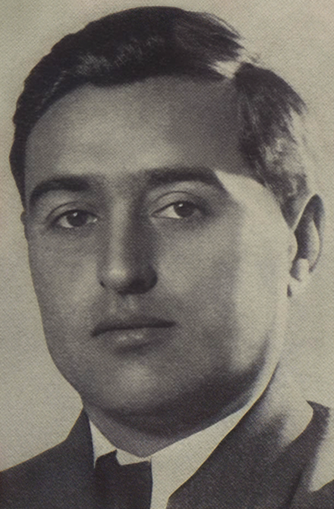
- Yagubov in 1938

First Secretary of the Central Committee of the Azerbaijan Communist Party
- In office 6 April 1953 – 17 February 1954
- Preceded by: Mir Jafar Baghirov
- Succeeded by: Imam Mustafayev

Minister of Internal Affairs
- In office 28 March 1946 – 27 May 1950
- Preceded by: Himself (as People's Commissar for Internal Affairs)
- Succeeded by: Agasalim Atakishiyev

People's Commissar for Internal Affairs
- In office 6 March 1941 – 28 March 1946
- Preceded by: Stepan Yemelianov
- Succeeded by: Himself (as Minister of Internal Affairs)
Additional positions
First Secretary of the Baku Oblast Committee of the Azerbaijan Communist Party
In office April 1952 – April 1953
Preceded by	Position established
Succeeded by	Position abolished
Second Secretary of the Central Committee of the Azerbaijan Communist Party
In office June 1950 – April 1952
Preceded by	Hasan Seyidov
Succeeded by	Vitaly Samedov
Secretary of the Central Committee of the Azerbaijan Communist Party
In office April 1939 – March 1941
First Secretary	Mir Jafar Baghirov
Chairman of the Supreme Soviet of the Azerbaijan SSR
In office 18 July 1938 – 7 April 1941
Preceded by	Position established
Succeeded by	Aziz Aliyev
First Secretary of the Central Committee of the Azerbaijani Komsomol
In office June 1936 – March 1938

Personal details
- Born: 6 November 1904 Baku, Baku Governorate, Russian Empire
- Died: 17 May 1970 (aged 65) Baku, Azerbaijani SSR, USSR
- Party: CPSU (1927–1956)
- Occupation: Land surveyor

Military service
- Rank: Lieutenant general (1945)

Mir Teymur Mir Alakbar oghlu Yagubov (Azerbaijani: Mir Teymur Mir Ələkbər oğlu Yaqubov; 6 November [O.S. 24 October] 1904–17 February 1970) was an Azerbaijani politician who served as the First Secretary of the Central Committee of the Azerbaijan Communist Party in 1953 and 1954.

A land surveyor by profession, Yagubov worked as a teacher and held various roles in the Azerbaijani Komsomol. From 1938, he was involved with the NKVD troika and served as Chairman of the Supreme Soviet of the Azerbaijan SSR, before becoming People's Commissar (Minister) for Internal Affairs, a position he held until 1950. After returning to party work, he held high-ranking positions within the Azerbaijan Communist Party and became the head of the Azerbaijan SSR in April 1953. He was dismissed 10 months later, in February 1954, after criticism of his organizational skills, and was expelled from the Communist Party of the Soviet Union in 1956.

== Early life ==
Mir Teymur Mir Alakbar oghlu Yagubov was born on 6 November [O.S. 24 October] 1904, in Baku. His father served as a sailor and rose to the rank of captain. However, due to the family's financial difficulties, Mir Teymur was only able to receive primary education. In 1916, he graduated from the four-year Russian-Tatar (Azerbaijani) school in Baku, and from May 1919 to June 1920, he worked as a cashier at the Aliyev Brothers' bank.

After Soviet rule was established in Azerbaijan, Mir Teymur Yagubov worked at the Baku Soviet, serving as senior supervisor of the municipal economy department from June 1920 to September 1925, and the responsible secretary of the organizational department from September 1925 to August 1926. During these years, he also pursued his education, graduating from the evening courses of the Workers' Faculty in 1926. At the same time, he became a member of the Russian Young Communist League in 1923, a candidate for membership in the Russian Communist (Bolshevik) Party in April 1925, and a full member of the party in September 1927.

After completing his education at the Workers' Faculty, Mir Teymur Yagubov was sent to continue his education at the Land Use Planning Institute in Moscow in 1926, where he graduated as an engineer in 1930. Due to his academic achievements, he pursued his education in the postgraduate program and was also sent to the Lenin All-Union Academy of Agricultural Sciences. Upon completing his postgraduate studies, he received the titles of docent (associate professor) and senior researcher in the field of agricultural organization and returned to Baku. From May 1933 to September 1934, he worked as the vice rector for academic affairs and head of department at the Azerbaijan Higher Communist Agricultural School. In September 1934, he was promoted to the ranks of the Central Committee of the Communist Party of Azerbaijan, where he worked as an instructor in the agricultural department for higher education institutions. In March 1936, he returned to the educational field, teaching at the Azerbaijan Higher Communist Agricultural School and the Baku Land Use Planning Technical School.

== Political career ==
In June 1936, Mir Teymur Yagubov was elected First Secretary of the Central Committee of the Leninist Young Communist League of Azerbaijan, a position he held until March 1938. On February 13, 1938, he was appointed as a member of the Special Troika of the NKVD for the Azerbaijan SSR by the Politburo of the Central Committee of the All-Union Communist Party (Bolsheviks). Around the same time, he was also elected as a deputy to the 1st convocation of the Supreme Soviet of the Soviet Union, a post he held until 1946. In July 1938, Yagubov was also elected as the first Chairman of the Supreme Soviet of the Azerbaijan SSR, where he served until 1941.

In March 1938, Yagubov became the Third Secretary of the Central Committee of the Communist Party of Azerbaijan, and in April 1939, he was promoted to Secretary for Propaganda and Agitation, a position he held until March 1941. From March 1940 to March 1941, he also headed the Party's Propaganda and Agitation Department. In March 1941, Yagubov was appointed People's Commissar for Internal Affairs of the Azerbaijan SSR, later serving as Minister of Internal Affairs from 1946. During World War II, he oversaw special operations to identify Soviet Azerbaijani soldiers who had served in the Nazi military. In February 1949, Yagubov reported to the leadership of the republic that from mid-1946 to February 1949, "2,516 former legionnaires were identified and sent to special camps"

During his tenure as People's Commissar (Minister) of Internal Affairs, Mir Teymur Yagubov was granted high ranks, including Major of State Security on 29 March 1941, Commissioner of State Security on 14 February 1943, 3rd-class Commissioner of State Security on 14 December 1944. He was subsequently promoted to the rank of Lieutenant General on 9 July 1945.

In May 1950, Yagubov transitioned back to party work and was discharged from the internal affairs service. In June of that year, he became Second Secretary of the Communist Party of Azerbaijan, and when the Baku Oblast was established in April 1952, he took the position of the First Secretary of the Baku Oblast Committee of the party.

=== As leader of the Azerbaijan SSR ===
On April 6, 1953, Mir Teymur Yagubov was elected as the First Secretary of the Central Committee of the Azerbaijan Communist Party, replacing Mir Jafar Baghirov. In July 1953, at a joint plenary session of the Central Committee and Baku Committee of the Communist Party of Azerbaijan, Yagubov delivered a report harshly criticizing the activities of his predecessor, Mir Jafar Baghirov. However, shortly afterward, Yagubov himself came under criticism. At the September 1953 plenary session of the Central Committee of the Communist Party of the Soviet Union, Yagubov faced significant opposition, with his speeches being met with sarcastic remarks from Vyacheslav Molotov and Lazar Kaganovich.

In January 1954, a group of CPSU Central Committee members visited Baku to assess the situation and prepare a report for Nikita Khrushchev. The report gave a highly negative assessment of Yagubov and Teymur Guliyev's leadership, citing their failure to pay adequate attention to agricultural development and their detachment from party and Soviet activists, whom they failed to engage with effectively. Yagubov was also blamed for being unable to organize the work of the Central Committee Bureau and for his reluctance to make changes in key leadership positions. The CPSU Central Committee delegation recommended his removal from office due to these shortcomings. He was replaced by Imam Mustafayev.

== Later years and death ==
After being removed from his leadership position, Mir Teymur Yagubov worked as the director of the Khachmaz Canning Factory from May 1954 to 1956.

On August 28, 1956, he was dismissed from membership of the Communist Party with a decision of the Central Committee of the Azerbaijan Communist Party. The decision was based on accusations that he had engaged in criminal, anti-party, and anti-state activities, directly participated in the repression of Soviet citizens, and violated socialist principles.

From 1957, Yagubov worked as an engineer in the project-estimate group of the "Azprodstroy" republic trust. He died on February 13, 1970.

== Honours ==
Mir Teymur Yagubov received several significant awards throughout his career. He was awarded the Order of Lenin on 27 April 1940, and received the Order of the Red Banner twice, on 15 June 1943 and 24 August 1949. His other honors included the Order of the Red Banner of Labour on 25 February 1946, the Order of the Red Star on 28 November 1941, and the Medal For the Victory over Germany in the Great Patriotic War 1941–1945. On 24 April 1943, he was also named an Honored Worker of the NKVD.

== See also ==
- Minister of Internal Affairs of Azerbaijan

Party political offices
Preceded by Mir Jafar Baghirov	First Secretary of the Azerbaijan Communist Party; 1953–1954	Succeeded by Imam Mustafayev
