= Ağahüseyn Kazımov =

Azerbaijani physician (1892–1937)

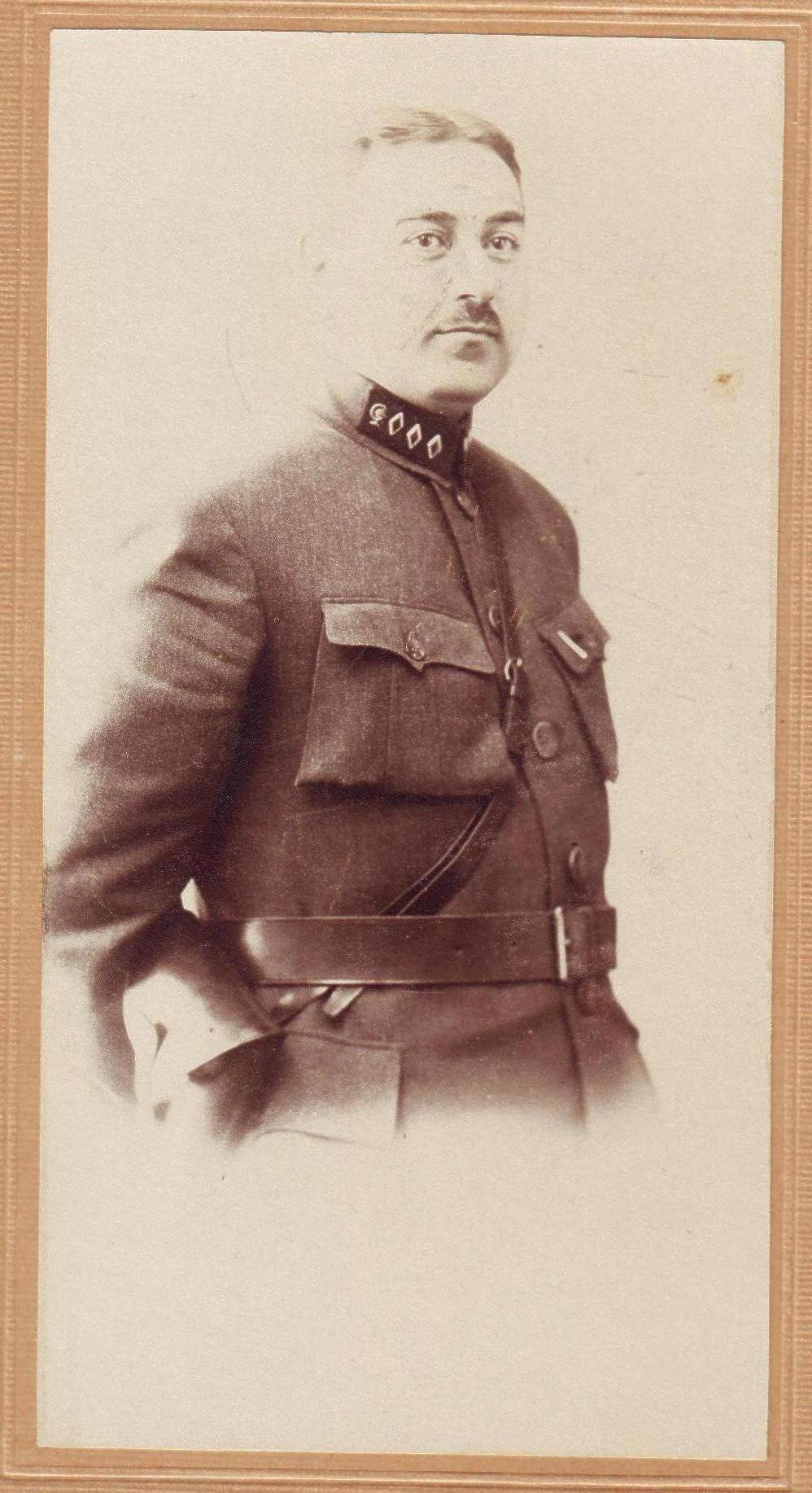

Commissar of Healthcare of Azerbaijan Soviet Socialist Republic
- In office June 5, 1920 – December 18, 1921
- Preceded by: Abid Alimov
- Succeeded by: Movsum Kadyrli

Personal details
- Born: 5 March 1882
- Died: 1937 (aged 54–55)
- Education: National University of Kyiv
- Occupation: Physician

Ağahüseyn Kazımov (1892–1937) joined the Council of People's Commissars of Azerbaijan as the People's Commissar's deputy for Health in Azerbaijan following the establishment of the Azerbaijan Soviet Socialist Republic on 28 April 1920. On 5 June 1920, he was appointed as Commissar for Health. He was replaced by Movsum Kadyrli on 28 November 1921.

Kazimov was arrested and shot in 1937 as an enemy of the people.
