= Jahangir Baghirov =

Soviet military personnel (1919–1943)

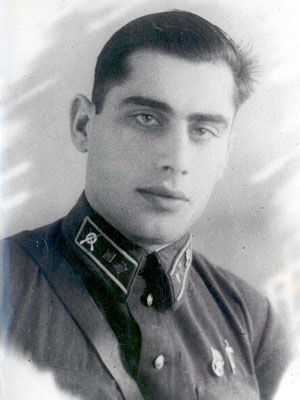
- Born: 6 October 1919
- Died: 5 June 1943 (aged 23)
- Other name: Vladimir Jafarovich Baghirov
- Military career
- Allegiance: USSR
- Branch: Red Army, Air Forces
- Service years: 1938–1943
- Rank: Senior sergeant
- Conflicts: World War II; Eastern Front †
- Awards: Order of Lenin

Jahangir Mir Jafar oglu Baghirov (6 October 1919 – 5 June 1943) was a Soviet Azerbaijani military pilot of World War II and son of statesman Mir Jafar Baghirov. For his action against a German fighter plane Jahangir Baghirov was posthumously awarded the Order of Lenin.

== Life ==
Jahangir Baghirov was born to Mir Jafar Baghirov and his Russian wife Mariya Sergeyeva in Astrakhan. He was given a second, Russian name, Vladimir. Shortly before the German invasion of the Soviet Union, Jahangir Baghirov graduated from the International Faculty of Moscow State University, as well as from the Yeysk Military Aviation School and the Tashkent Military Academy.

In 1938, he started his military service, initially in the Red Army. From 15 July 1941 he served as a platoon commander of the 616th Rifle Regiment on the Soviet Western Front. The same year, on 10 October, he was wounded in both arms.

On 4 February 1943, Baghirov in a letter to his father, wrote: "For two and a half months now, I have been out of place, parasitising on food, which is now so costly, sitting idle when the motherland is in danger... If you only knew how ashamed I am to look people in the eye, being young, healthy and sitting out in the rear. Please speed up my departure for the frontline. I'm willing to fight on anything. I don't need their renowned planes, which I've been waiting for two and a half months for. I'm even willing to fly a U-2, and I'll still be fighting... I can wait another week, then I'll be off to the first unit I'll meet, and then to the frontline". After hospital treatment, Baghirov, having previous flight training, was sent to Rustavi Military Aviation School and from there he was assigned to the 40th Guards Aviation Regiment. There he mastered the La-5 fighter and from 1 May 1943 started his pilot service. Within the regiment, Baghirov participated in 19 scrambles and 5 dogfights, receiving 17 hours and 30 minutes of flight experience.

== Death ==
On June 5, 1943, Baghirov was scrambled within a group of 14 La-5 fighters to intercept 14 German warplanes in Kursk Oblast. In ensuing dogfight Baghirov shot down two German Ju-88 bombers. However, his fuel or ammunition was running low and he decided to ram a German Me-109 fighter. Both planes exploded in the sky. For this action he was posthumously awarded the Order of Lenin.

According to Azerbaijani researcher Adigezal Mamedov, Soviet statesman Mikhail Kalinin offered to posthumously award Jahangir Baghirov the title of the Hero of the Soviet Union, but Mir Jafar Baghirov declined, saying that it would be immodest for a son of a high-ranking official like him.

After Mir Jafar Baghirov was sentenced to death in April 1956 for "terrorist reprisals against Soviet citizens", he requested to visit his son's grave at Badamdar Cemetery. Following the trial, Mir Jafar Baghirov, accompanied by guards, visited the grave and spent there one hour and twenty-six minutes, bidding farewell.

== Commemoration ==
In 1993, a bust of Jahangir Baghirov was installed in Azerbaijani city of Quba, and a park was set around it, which became popularly known as Jahangir Baghirov Square. However, on the orders of some local officials, the bust was removed, leaving a bare pedestal.
