= Mir Jafar Baghirov =

Azerbaijani Soviet politician (1895–1956)

- Mir Cəfər Bağırov
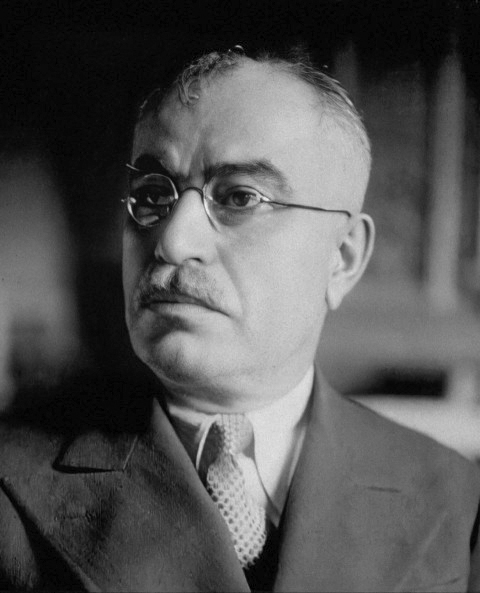
- Baghirov in 1948

First Secretary of the Central Committee of the Communist Party of Azerbaijan
- In office 10 December 1933 – 18 April 1953
- Preceded by: Ruben Rubenov
- Succeeded by: Mir Teymur Yaqubov

Chairman of the Council of Ministers of the Azerbaijan SSR
- In office 18 April 1953 – 17 August 1953
- Preceded by: Teymur Guliyev
- Succeeded by: Teymur Guliyev

Candidate member of the 19th Presidium
- In office 6 March 1953 – 7 July 1953

Personal details
- Born: 17 September 1896 Quba, Baku Governorate, Russian Empire
- Died: 7 May 1956 (aged 59) Siberia, Russian SFSR, Soviet Union
- Party: Communist Party of the Soviet Union (1918–1953)
- Children: Mirza Baghirov, Jahangir Baghirov, Jen Baghirov
- Occupation: teacher

Mir Jafar Abbas oghlu Baghirov (Azerbaijani: Мир Ҹәфәр Аббас оғлу Бағыров, romanized: Mir Cəfər Abbas oğlu Bağırov, Russian: Мир Джафар Аббасович Багиров; 17 September 1896–7 May 1956) was the communist leader of the Azerbaijan SSR from 1933 to 1953, under the Soviet leadership of Joseph Stalin.

== Early life ==
Born in Quba of Baku Governorate in 1896, Baghirov studied pedagogy in Petrovsk. From 1915 to 1917, M J. Baghirov worked as a school teacher in a village in Khudat. He joined the Bolsheviks in March 1917 and was elected deputy chairman of the Quba revolutionary committee. From 1918 to 1921, he participated in the October Revolution and the Russian Civil War as commander of a regiment, military commissar of the Azerbaijani division, advisor to the Caucasus corps of the Russian military command, and the head of the revolutionary tribunal of the Azerbaijani division. After the Soviet takeover of Azerbaijan, Baghirov was appointed Chairman of the Revolutionary Committee of the Karabakh region of Azerbaijan. It was reported that Baghirov worked as well for the Azerbaijan Democratic Republic's police. In February 1921, he joined the Cheka, the Soviet secret police, later renamed the OGPU. In 1927–29, he served as the director of the Department for Water Distribution of the Transcaucasia SFSR. From December 1929 to August 1930, Baghirov was the head of the state security services in Azerbaijan.

== Relationship with Beria ==
In 1929-1930, one of Baghirov's subordinates in the Cheka was the young Lavrentiy Beria, whose career he sponsored. Beria repaid him when he was appointed overlord of the three Transcaucasian republics (Azerbaijan, Armenia, and Georgia) in 1932, first by arranging for Baghirov to be appointed the “responsible instructor” of the Central Committee of the Communist Party of the Soviet Union in Azerbaijan, and then the boss of the Azerbaijan communist party. According to Beria's son, Sergo:

My father’s relations were excellent with the First Secretary of the Azerbaijan Communist Party, Jafar Bagirov. The two men had no secrets from each other. [...] This man spoke Turkish and Iranian [sic] perfectly, had a lively mind, was able to find his bearings quickly in the most diverse situations, and had shown himself to be a competent administrator, well informed about the oil industry. He did not drink and believed in neither God nor the Devil, and still less in communism.

== First Secretary of the Communist Party ==
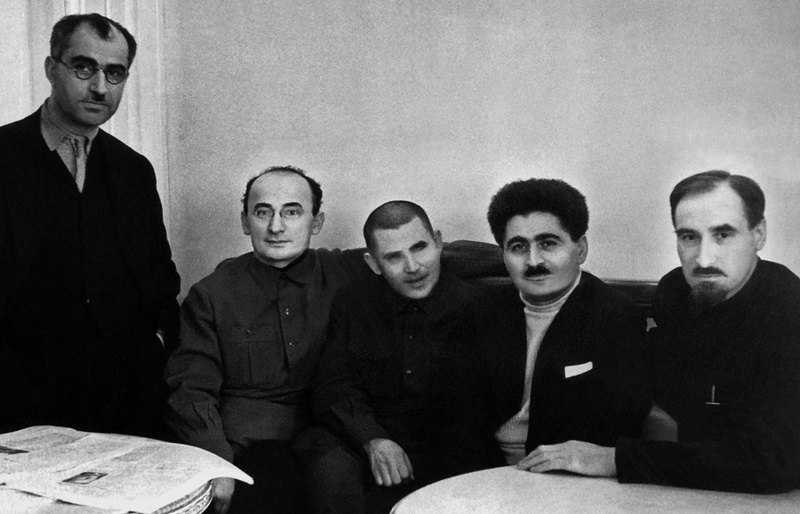
Baghirov (standing, left) at the 17th Congress of the All-Union Communist Party (Bolsheviks), with (left to right) Lavrentiy Beria, Nikolai Yezhov, Aghasi Khanjian and Robert Eikhe

Baghirov was the first secretary of the Central Committee of the Azerbaijan Communist Party from December 1933 to April 1953. He was the only regional party boss apart from Andrei Zhdanov in Leningrad to remain in office throughout the Great Purge, during which more than 10,000 people in Azerbaijan were shot on charges of plotting to assassinate Baghirov. In October 1937, he was raised to full membership of the Central Committee of the Communist Party of the Soviet Union after a clutch of incumbents had been denounced as "enemies of the people".

On 7 March 1953, just after the death of Joseph Stalin, Baghirov was appointed a candidate member of the Presidium (Politburo) of the Central Committee, which meant that he was officially the most senior communist official based in any of the smaller Soviet republics outside Russia. On 21 April, he transferred himself to the post of chairman of the Council of Ministers of the Azerbaijan SSR, but on 19 July was sacked, in the wake of the arrest of Beria.

== Trial and execution ==
Baghirov was arrested in 1954 and charged with having been a bandit during the Russian Civil War, being responsible for the deaths of a large number of senior Azerbaijani communists during the Great Purge, including Gazanfar Musabekov, Huseyn Rahmanov, Hamid Sultanov, Ayna Sultanova and many more, and of "being one of the most active and intimate accomplices of the traitor Beria." He was tried with five others at a special session of the Military Collegium of the USSR Supreme Court in Baku on 12–26 April 1956. In his final 17-minute speech before the court, he favored the sentence and refused to apply for any pardon. Baghirov was executed on 7 May 1956.

Mir Jafar Baghirov is a controversial figure in Azerbaijani history. By 1940 an estimated 70,000 Azerbaijanis had died as a result of purges carried out under Baghirov. The intelligentsia was decimated, broken, and eliminated as a social force, and the old guard Communist elite was destroyed. However, Baghirov was also successful in resisting the Armenian demands to cede the Nagorno-Karabakh Autonomous Oblast of the Azerbaijan SSR to the Armenian SSR.

He was credited for treating his junior son as an ordinary Soviet citizen. Baghirov sent his son, Vladimir (Jahangir) Baghirov, a military pilot, to the Soviet Army to fight against Nazi Germany. He was killed in battle in June 1943, after performing an aerial ramming.

== Honours and awards ==
- Order of the Red Banner (twice)
- Five Orders of Lenin
- Order of the Red Banner of Labor (twice)
- Order of the Red Banner of the Azerbaijan SSR
- Order of the Patriotic War

Party political offices
Preceded by Ruben Rubenov	First Secretary of the Azerbaijan Communist Party; 1933–1953	Succeeded by Mir Teymur Yaqubov
