= Ruben Rubenov =

Azerbaijani politician (1893–1937)

First Secretary of the Azerbaijan Communist Party
- In office 7 February 1933 – 10 December 1933

Personal details
- Born: 1894 Tiflis, Tiflis Governorate, Caucasus Viceroyalty, Russian Empire
- Died: 1937 (aged 42–43) Butovo firing range, Moscow, Russian SFSR, Soviet Union
- Party: RSDLP (Bolsheviks) (1914–1918); Russian Communist Party (1918–1937)

Ruben Gukasovich Rubenov (Russian: Рубен Гукасович Рубенов, Azerbaijani: Рубен Гукасович Рубенов, romanized: Ruben Qukasoviç Rubenov, Armenian: Ռուբեն Ղուկասի Ռուբենով) (1894 – 27 November 1937), also known as Ruben Mkrtichyan, was a Bolshevik revolutionary and Soviet politician who served as the 6th First Secretary of Azerbaijan Communist Party and revolutionary.

== Early years and career ==
Rubenov was born in 1893 to an Armenian worker's family in Tiflis. In 1914, he joined the Bolshevik Party ranks. Before the Russian revolution of 1917, he was arrested several times for his revolutionary activities in Transcaucasia. On 7 February 1933 he was appointed the First Secretary of Azerbaijan SSR and served until 10 December that year, when he was replaced by Mir Jafar Baghirov. He was then appointed the Plenipotentiary of the Party Control Committee for the Kiev Oblast of Ukrainian SSR in 1934.

== Arrest and execution ==
On 15 September 1937 he was arrested for "participation in terrorist activities" and sentenced to execution by firing squad by Military Tribunal. He was executed on 27 November 1937 at Butovo firing range. On 17 November 1954 he was posthumously rehabilitated by Military Collegium of the Supreme Court of the USSR.

Party political offices
Preceded by Vladimir Polonsky	First Secretary of the Azerbaijan Communist Party; 1933–1933	Succeeded by Mir Jafar Baghirov
