= Kharkiv Regional Committee of the Communist Party of Ukraine =

The Kharkiv Regional Committee of the Communist Party of Ukraine, commonly referred to as the Kharkiv CPU obkom, was the position of highest authority in the Kharkiv Oblast, in the Ukrainian SSR of the Soviet Union. The position was created on February 27, 1932, and abolished in August 1991. The First Secretary was a de facto appointed position usually by the Central Committee of the Communist Party of Ukraine or the First Secretary of the Republic.

== List of First Secretaries of the Communist Party of Kharkiv ==
Name	Term of Office		Life years
Name	Start	End	Life years
First Secretaries of the Oblast Committee of the Communist Party
Roman Terekhov	February 27, 1932	January 29, 1933	1890–1979
Pavel Postyshev	January 29, 1933	June 5, 1934	1887–1939
Mykola Demchenko	June 5, 1934	September 21, 1936	1896–1937
Sergei Kudryavtsev	September 21, 1936	February 5, 1937	1903–1938
Mykola Hykalo	February 5, 1937	October 1937	1897–1938
Oleksandr Osypov (Note: Acting to June 1938)	October 1937	December 1938	1899–193.
Oleksiy Frolkov	December 1938	March 17, 1940	
Oleksiy Yepishev	March 20, 1940	April 1942	1908–1985
Nazi German occupation (1941–1943)
Illya Profatilov (Note: Acting)	1943	1944	1906–1975
Viktor Churayev	1944	June 1948	1904–1982
Borys Koval	June 1948	December 1948	1903–1959
Viktor Churayev	December 1948	April 1950	1904–1982
Nikolai Podgorny	1950	1953	1903–1983
Vitaliy Titov	July 1953	March 2, 1961	1907–1980
Mykola Sobol (Note: For Industry January 11, 1963 – July 1963)	March 2, 1961	July 1963	1910–1991
Borys Voltovsky (Note: For Agriculture)	January 8, 1963	December 1964	1906–1983
Hryhoriy Vashchenko (Note: For Industry to December 1964)	July 1963	June 15, 1972	1920–1990
Ivan Sokolov	June 15, 1972	February 1976	1928–1982
Ivan Sakhnyuk	February 1976	June 10, 1980	1927–
Vladyslav Mysnychenko	June 10, 1980	January 5, 1990	1929–
Anatoliy Myalytsya	January 5, 1990	August 1991	1940–

== See also ==
- Kharkiv Oblast

== Sources ==
- World Statesmen.org
