= Valery Grigoryan =

Azerbaijani politician

Valery Grigoryan was the former chairman for the Azerbaijan Communist Party for the Karabakh Autonomous Oblast committee.

Grigoryan was killed in Stepanakert, Nagorno-Karabakh. The KGB office had reported that he was killed by opponents of the Armenian-Azerbaijani truce. Grigoryan was part of a group that would meet with the president of Azerbaijan, Ayaz Mutalibov.

There was only one Armenian, Valery Grigorian, who attended the committee meetings, but he was later killed... The only mechanism they had was the Soviet army through the commandant, General Safonov.
