= Imam Mustafayev =

Azerbaijani politician and scientist (1910–1997)

- İmam Mustafayev
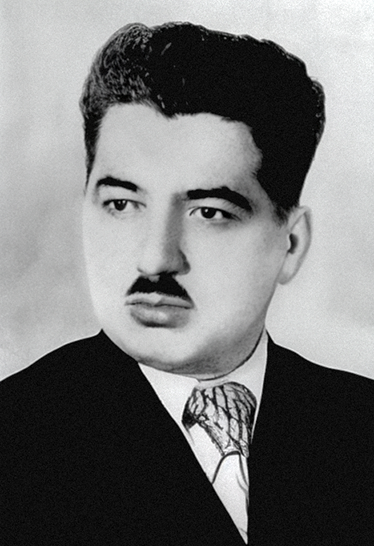

First Secretary of the Central Committee of the Azerbaijan Communist Party
- In office 17 February 1954 – 8 July 1959
- Preceded by: Mir Teymur Yagubov
- Succeeded by: Vali Akhundov

First Secretary of the Ganja Oblast Committee of the Azerbaijan Communist Party
- In office April 1952 – April 1953
- Preceded by: Position established
- Succeeded by: Position abolished

Minister of Agriculture
- In office 24 March 1947 – 16 March 1950
- Preceded by: Position established
- Succeeded by: Ahmad Khalilov

Personal details
- Born: 25 February 1910 Qakh, Zakatal okrug, Russian Empire
- Died: 10 March 1997 (aged 87) Baku, Azerbaijan
- Party: Communist Party of the Soviet Union (since 1940)

Imam Dashdemir oglu Mustafayev (Azerbaijani: İmam Daşdəmir oğlu Mustafayev; 25 February 1910 – 10 March 1997) was an Azerbaijani politician and scientist who headed the Azerbaijan SSR as the First Secretary of the Azerbaijan Communist Party from 1954 to 1959.

The son of a poor peasant, he was born in a village of the Qakh region in Azerbaijan. In 1928 he graduated from the Zaqatala Agricultural Technical School and in 1932 from the Institute of Agriculture of Azerbaijan (now Azerbaijan State University of Economics). Subsequently, he conducted scientific research. Mustafayev was awarded the Order of the Red Banner of Labour and the Order of the Badge of Honour.

== Political career ==
In 1940, he joined the Azerbaijan Communist Party and received many important encharges. In 1954, he was elected the First Secretary of Azerbaijan Communist Party. In 1956 together with the then chairman of the Supreme Soviet of the Azerbaijan SSR, Mirza Ibrahimov, he was able to introduce a new paragraph to the constitution of the Azerbaijan SSR that for the first time since the Soviet invasion declared Azerbaijani language the official language of the Azerbaijan SSR. As a result of this step which was not agreed upon with Moscow (out of fears of it getting refused) Azerbaijani acquired increasingly an important status in the entire country. This was the main reason behind his premature removal from power. Mustafayev was implicitly accused of nationalism, and on 12 June 1959 he was fired for "not being able to cope with his work" and was expelled from membership of the bureau of the Azerbaijan Communist Party Central Committee. After being removed from that office, he worked as the Director of Azerbaijan National Academy of Sciences.

Party political offices
| Preceded by Mir Teymur Yaqubov | First Secretary of the Azerbaijan Communist Party; 1954–1959 | Succeeded by Vali Akhundov |
