= Council of People's Commissars of Azerbaijan SSR =

Governing body of the Azerbajin Soviet Socialist Republic

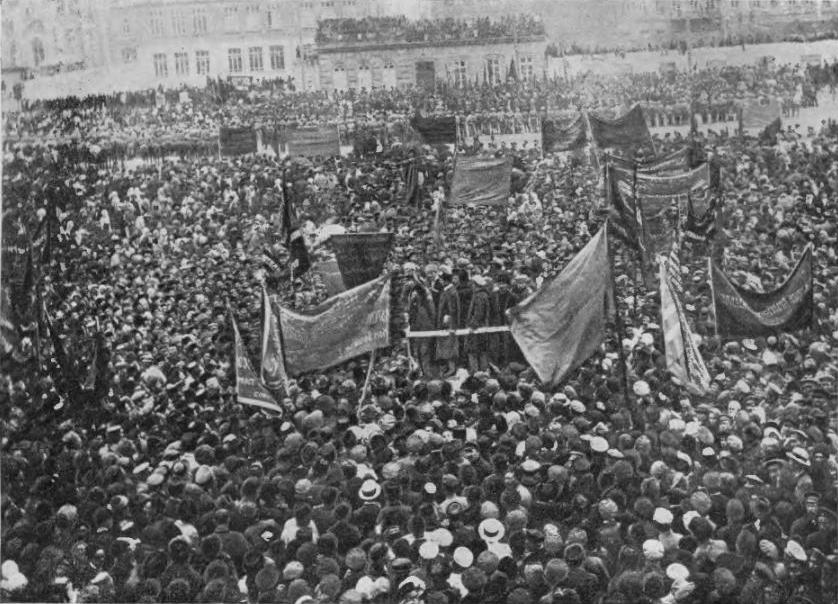
Bolshevik rally in Baku, 1920 with both the 11th Red Army and the local public

The Council of People's Commissars of Azerbaijan (Azerbaijani: Azərbaycan SSR Xalq Komissarları Soveti) was established as the governing body of the Azerbaijan Soviet Socialist Republic. Accounts differ as to whether it was formed on 28 April 1920 (Mil'man and Guliev) or at the First All-Azerbaijan Congress of Soviets, 6-19 May (Kharmandarian). The 11th Red Army had moved into north Azerbaijan following the defeat of General Anton Denikin's Volunteer Army. The Baku Bureau of Kavkraikom (the Caucasian Regional Committee) of the Russian Communist Party (Bolshevik) had held a joint meeting with the Communist Party of Azerbaijan on 27 April at which they formed the Azerbaijan Revolutionary Committee (Azrevkom). This new body issued an ultimatum to the government of the Azerbaijan Democratic Republic, who immediately surrendered: The Red Army had sent an armoured train directly to Baku which arrived on 28 April. The terms of the surrender passed lawful power to Azrevkom, to whom several key figures had been appointed in their absence. In particular Nariman Narimanov was absent having travelled to Moscow to see Lenin and Stalin and only arrived in Baku on 16 May. Thus although he was declared the chairperson of the AzSovnarkom, this was a role he could only truly assume when he arrived in the middle of the First All-Azerbaijan Congress of Soviets. The senior Bolsheviks responsible for stage managing the foundation of the AzSovnarkom were Sergei Kirov and Grigoriy Ordzhonikidze.

== Original membership of AzSovnarkom ==
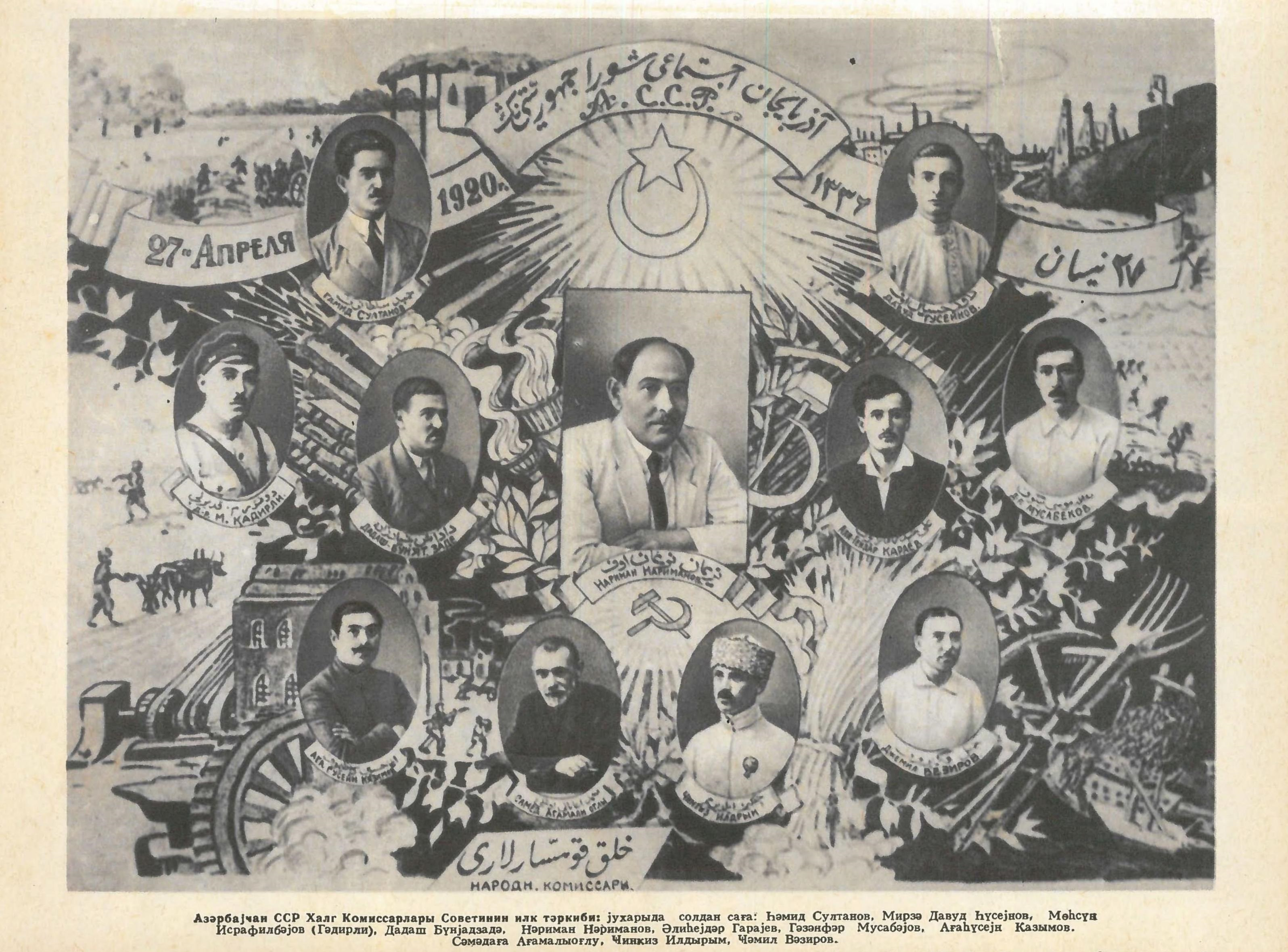
The First Council of People's Commissars of Azerbaijan SSR

Established 28 April 1920:

- Nariman Narimanov Chairman of the Council of People's Commissars
- Chingiz Ildyrym, People's Commissar of Naval Affairs
- Hamid Sultanov, People's Commissar of Internal Affairs
- Aliheydar Garayev, People's Commissar of Labor and Justice
- Gazanfar Musabekov, People's Commissar of Agriculture, Commerce, Industry and Food
- Mirza Davud Huseynov, People's Commissar of Finance
- Samad aga Agamalioglu
- Dadash Bunyadzade, People's Commissar of Education and State Control
- Cemil bey Vezirov, People's Commissar of Posts, Telegraphs and Communications
- Ağahüseyn Kazımov People’s Commissar of Health

== Later development ==
On 28 November 28, Movsum Kadyrli was appointed People’s Commissar of Health of the AzSSR. He held this position until January 21, 1935.
