= Vali Akhundov =

Soviet politician

- Vəli Axundov
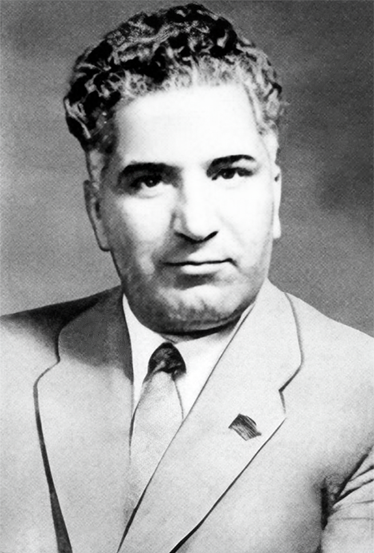
- Akhundov in 1950s

First Secretary of the Central Committee of the Azerbaijan Communist Party
- In office 10 July 1959 – 14 July 1969
- Preceded by: Imam Mustafayev
- Succeeded by: Heydar Aliyev

Chairman of the Council of Ministers
- In office 8 July 1958 – 10 July 1959
- Preceded by: Sadig Rahimov
- Succeeded by: Mamed Iskenderov

Minister of Healthcare
- In office 27 May 1954 – 31 January 1958
- Preceded by: Alihuseyn Huseynov
- Succeeded by: Boyuk Aghayev

Personal details
- Born: 14 May [O.S. 1 May] 1916 Baku, Baku Governorate, Russian Empire
- Died: 22 August 1986 (aged 70) Baku, Azerbaijan SSR, USSR
- Party: Communist Party of the Soviet Union (1939–1986)
- Occupation: Doctor

Vali Yusif oghlu Akhundov (Azerbaijani: Вәли Јусиф оғлу Ахундов, romanized: Vəli Yusif oğlu Axundov; 14 May [O.S. 1 May] 1916 – 22 August 1986), also spelled Veli Akhundov, was an Azerbaijani politician and physician who headed the Azerbaijan SSR as the First Secretary of the Azerbaijan Communist Party from 1959 to 1969.

== Early life ==
Akhundov was born in Baku, in the Baku Governorate of the Russian Empire in 1916. In 1941, he graduated from Azerbaijan State Medical Institute and completed his research in 1964, receiving a PhD in Medical Sciences and obtaining the titles of Professor and Academician in 1964 and 1966, respectively. From 1946 through 1949, Akhundov served as the Chairman of Committee of Trade Union of Medical Workers. In 1949, he was appointed Deputy Minister of Public Health of Azerbaijan SSR and left the post for the position of Deputy Chief of the Central Committee of Communist Party of Azerbaijan SSR in 1953, and in 1954, was appointed the Minister of Public Health of the Azerbaijan SSR, which he held until 1958. Akhundov served as the chairman of the Council of Ministers for a period of one year and was eventually appointed the first secretary of the Central Committee of the Communist Party of Azerbaijan SSR, a position he held until 1969, when he was replaced by Heydar Aliyev.

== Scientific activity ==
Academician V.Y. Akhundov is the author of more than 400 scientific works, including 6 monographs, and the editor of many scientific collections and works. Veli Akhundov’s monographs are the result of his many years of research. Most of his scientific works are primarily devoted to the study of various aspects of environmental hygiene, and mark a significant contribution to the hygienic science and sanitary practice of Azerbaijan. In addition to water supply, he paid much attention to the problem of rural hygiene, soil hygiene, including in connection with the use of mineral fertilizers, bacterial contamination of dwellings, and problems of infectious pathology due to the sanitary condition of rural settlements in 1960-70. The distinctive features of scientific works of V.Y. Akhundov are their indispensable, organic connection with life and actual problems of practical public health.

== First Secretary of the Communist Party ==
Veli Akhundov succeeded Imam Mustafayev who served as the First Secretary from February 1954 to 1959. During his career, Akhundov was blamed for the economic crisis and was accused of corruption. In the mid-1960s, the number of ethnic Azerbaijanis in the Azerbaijan Communist Party apparatus grew, making up 61%; however, many key posts were still held by ethnic Russians and Armenians. Akhundov is credited in Azerbaijan for rebuffing the Armenian claims for Nagorno-Karabakh Autonomous Oblast in 1965 while he was in office.

After the end of his political career, Akhundov served as the vice president of the Azerbaijan National Academy of Sciences until 1972. He was then the principal at the Institute of Virology, Microbiology and Hygiene until his death in 1986.

== Awards ==
Akhundov has been awarded with Order of Lenin, Order of the Red Star, Order of the Patriotic War and other orders and medals of honor throughout his political and scientific career.

Party political offices
Preceded by Imam Mustafayev	First Secretary of the Azerbaijan Communist Party; 1959–1969	Succeeded by Heydar Aliyev
