= Constitutional Act on State Independence of the Republic of Azerbaijan =

Constitutional Act on State Independence of the Republic of Azerbaijan (Azerbaijani: Azərbaycan Respublikasının Dövlət Müstəqilliyi haqqında Konstitusiya Aktı) was adopted on October 18, 1991, after discussions in the Supreme Soviet of Azerbaijan. With this Constitutional Act, the state independence of Azerbaijan was restored. On December 29, 1991, this issue was discussed in a national referendum, and 95% of the population voted for the country's independence, sovereignty, and independence.

== History ==
On August 30, 1991, at the extraordinary session of the Supreme Soviet, after intensive discussions, the Declaration "On restoring the state independence of the Republic of Azerbaijan" was adopted. In the document, it was emphasized that the Republic of Azerbaijan is the successor of the Azerbaijan Democratic Republic, which existed in 1918–1920. At the same time, the parliament adopted a decision on the preparation of another law - the Constitutional Act - to create the constitutional foundations of Azerbaijan's state independence.

On October 8, 1991, the extraordinary session of the Supreme Soviet of Azerbaijan, which began its work, held discussions for 4 days. Finally, on October 18, 1991, the session of the Supreme Soviet adopted a historical document - the Constitutional Act on State Independence.

At that time, 258 out of 360 deputies of the Supreme Council voted for the act, the rest either did not participate in the session or voted against it.

== The text ==
=== I. General provisions ===
- Article 1. On April 27–28, 1920, the aggression of the XI army of the RSFSR against Azerbaijan, the occupation of the territory of the republic, and the overthrow of the Azerbaijan Democratic Republic, which is a subject of international law, should be considered as Russia's occupation of independent Azerbaijan.
- Article 2. The Republic of Azerbaijan is the successor of the Republic of Azerbaijan, which existed from May 28, 1918, to April 28, 1920.
- Article 3. The part of the agreement on the organization of the USSR dated December 30, 1922 concerning Azerbaijan is invalid from the moment of its signing. All issues of mutual relations with the sovereign states that were part of the former Soviet Union should be settled between the agreements and treaties.
- Article 4. The Constitution of the Republic of Azerbaijan of 1978 remains in force in those parts that do not conflict with the provisions of this Constitutional Act. All the acts that were in force before the declaration of the restoration of the state independence of the Republic of Azerbaijan, which do not contradict the sovereignty and territorial integrity of the Republic of Azerbaijan, and are aimed at changing the structure of the national state, retain their legal force in the Republic of Azerbaijan. Until the relevant laws of the Republic of Azerbaijan are adopted, the laws of the USSR retain their legal force in the territory of the Republic of Azerbaijan; the list of those laws is determined by the Parliament of the Republic of Azerbaijan.
- Article 5. Any action directed against the independence of the Republic of Azerbaijan is an interference in the internal affairs of the sovereign state, and these actions are responded to in accordance with the norms of international law.
- Article 6. Only that part of the state debt of the USSR can be transferred to the Republic of Azerbaijan, which was created as a result of economic activity in the territory of the republic and in connection with the property of the USSR that came into the possession of the Republic of Azerbaijan.
- Article 7. All movable and immovable property of the USSR on the territory of the Republic of Azerbaijan is the state property of the Republic of Azerbaijan. An exception is the part of the movable property of the USSR that can be transferred to other states - former subjects of the USSR - under the agreement in accordance with international law. The property of the USSR that is outside the borders of the Republic of Azerbaijan, but was created at the expense of the national income, natural and other resources of Azerbaijan during the period when Azerbaijan was a part of the USSR, is transferred to the Republic of Azerbaijan under the contract in the amount corresponding to the contribution of Azerbaijan in the creation of this property.
