= Nikolai Gikalo =

Soviet politician (1897–1938)

Nikolay Gikalo
- Николай Гикало
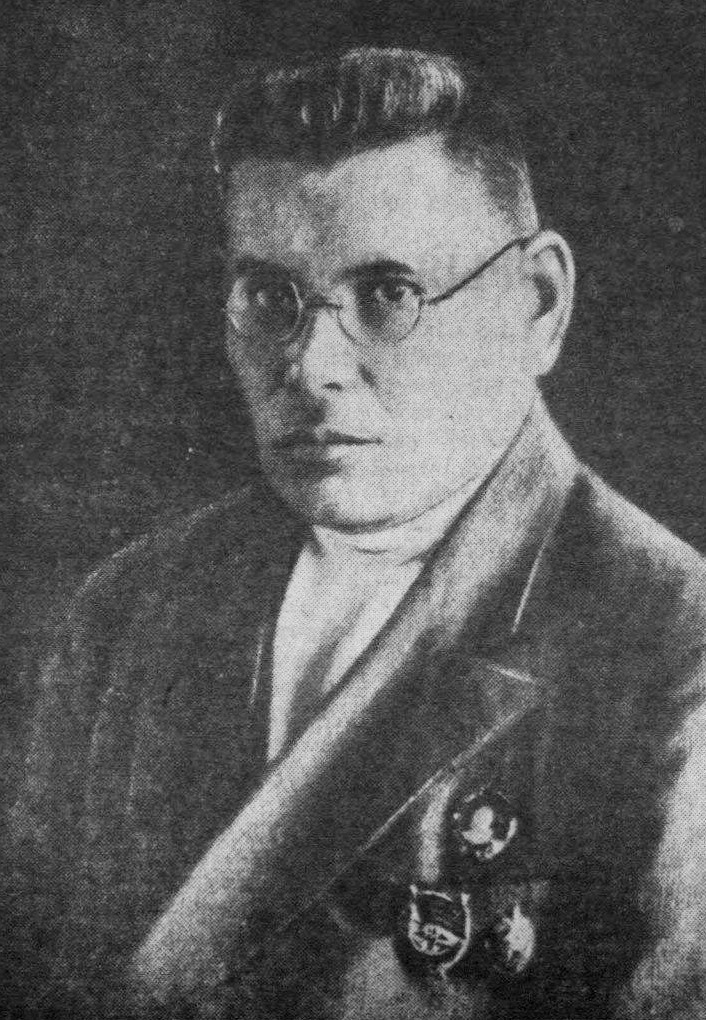
- Gikalo in 1935

First Secretary of the Uzbek Communist Party
- In office April 1929 – June 1929
- Preceded by: Kuprian Kirkizh
- Succeeded by: Isaak Zelensky

First Secretary of the Azerbaijan Communist Party
- In office August 1929 – June 1930
- Preceded by: Levon Mirzoyan
- Succeeded by: Vladimir Polonsky

First Secretary of the Byelorussian Communist Party
- In office January 1932 – March 1937
- Preceded by: Konstantin Gey
- Succeeded by: Vasily Sharangovich

First Secretary of the Kharkiv Regional Committee of the Communist Party of Ukraine
- In office March 1937 – October 1937

Personal details
- Born: March 8, 1897 Odessa, Kherson Governorate, Russian Empire
- Died: April 25, 1938 (aged 41) Moscow, USSR
- Party: Communist Party of the Soviet Union (1917–1937)

Nikolay Fyodorovich Gikalo (Russian: Никола́й Фёдорович Гика́ло; March 8, 1897 – April 25, 1938) was a Ukrainian Soviet revolutionary and statesman.

== Biography ==
He was born in Odessa into a Ukrainian peasant family on March 8, 1897. In 1915, he graduated from the Tiflis Military Paramedic School. From 1915 he served in the Russian Imperial Army, in 1917 he joined the Russian Social Democratic Labour Party (Bolsheviks). He commanded the Red Army in the fight against the White Army in the Northern Caucasus. He was first secretary of the Communist Party of Uzbekistan from April 1929 to June 11, 1929, first secretary of the Communist Party of Azerbaijan from 1929 to August 1930, first secretary of the Communist Party of Byelorussia from January 18, 1932, to March 18, 1937. During the Great Purge, Gikalo was arrested, accused of plotting against the Soviet state, sentenced to death and executed on April 25, 1938. He was exonerated posthumously in 1955.

A city in Chechnya is named after him. A street near Yakub Kolas Square is also named after him.

== Family ==
Wife: Natalya Yevgenyevna Chizhova (1897–1968), sentenced in 1938 as the “wife of an enemy of the people” and rehabilitated in 1955.

== See also ==
- Azerbaijan Communist Party
