= Vladimir Polonsky =

Soviet politician (1893–1937)

- Владимир Полонский
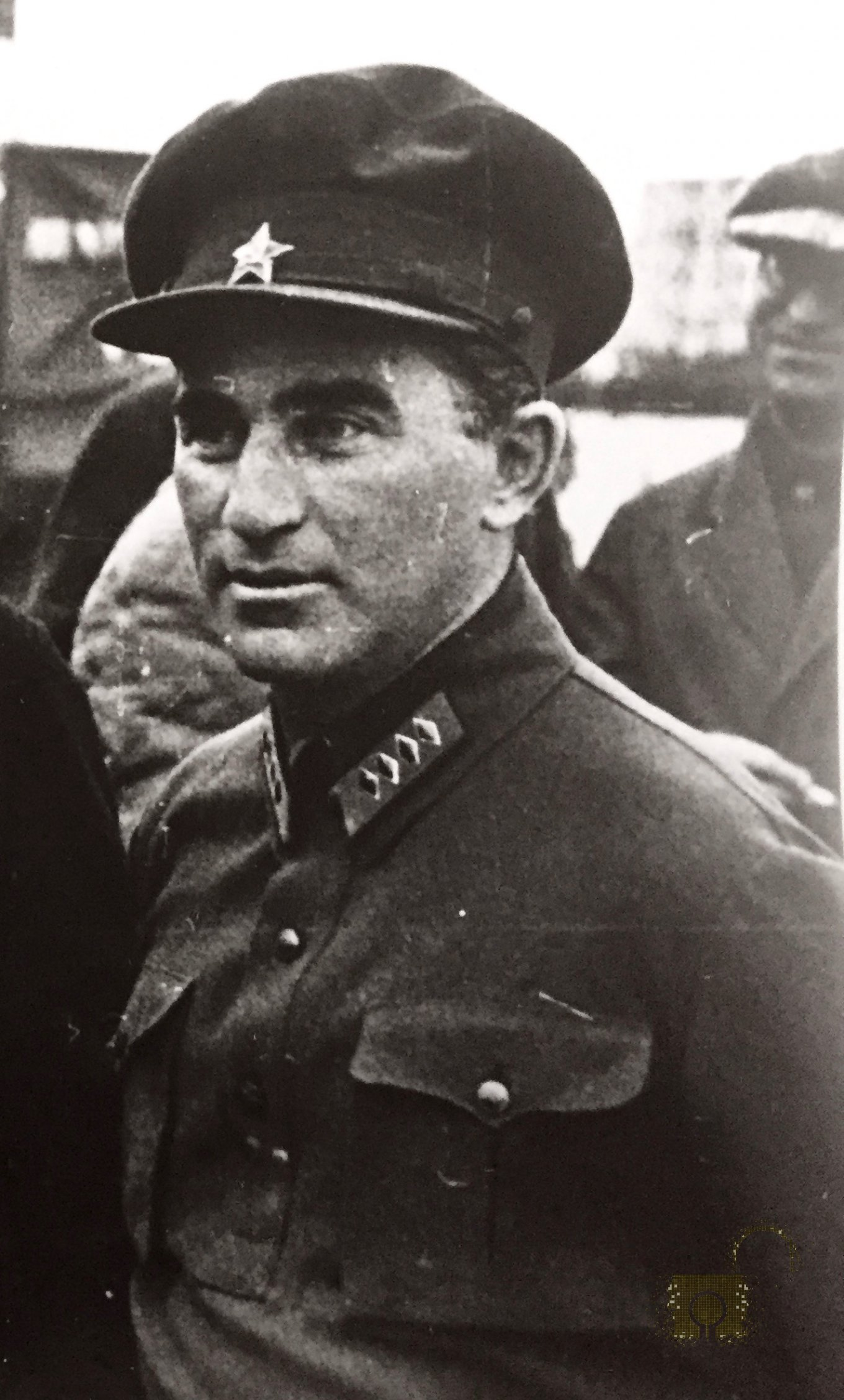

First Secretary of the Azerbaijan Communist Party
- In office 5 August 1930 – January 1933

Head of the Organizational-Instruction Department of the Central Committee
- In office January – August 1933
- Preceded by: Pavel Postyshev
- Succeeded by: Post abolished

Personal details
- Born: Ruven Gershevich Polonsky; 17 June 1893 Tobolsk, Russian Empire
- Died: 30 October 1937 (aged 44) Moscow, Russian SFSR, Soviet Union
- Party: RSDLP (Bolsheviks) (1907–1918); Russian Communist Party (1918–1937)
- Spouse: Esfir Iosifovna Mogilevskaya
- Children: Liya, Vladimir

Vladimir Ivanovich Polonsky (Azerbaijani: Владимир Полонски Ыван оғлу, romanized: Vladimir Polonski Ivan oğlu, Russian: Владимир Иванович Полонский; 17 June 1893 – 30 October 1937) was a Soviet politician and the 5th First Secretary of Azerbaijan Communist Party.

== Early life ==
Polonsky was born to a Jewish family in Tobolsk, Russia. Since 1907, he was a member of the Bolshevik faction of the Russian Social Democratic Labour Party (RSDLP). Starting from 1908, Polonsky has been a sailor and worked blue collar jobs in Saint Petersburg.

== Political career ==
In 1913, he became a member of union administration. He was jailed for his political activities in 1914. In 1918–1920, he was a division commissar on Western and Southern fronts and the chairman for the southern region of Trade unions in the Soviet Union. In 1930–1933, Polonsky was the First Secretary of the Azerbaijan Communist Party and the Secretary of Transcaucasian Committee of CP of Soviet Union.

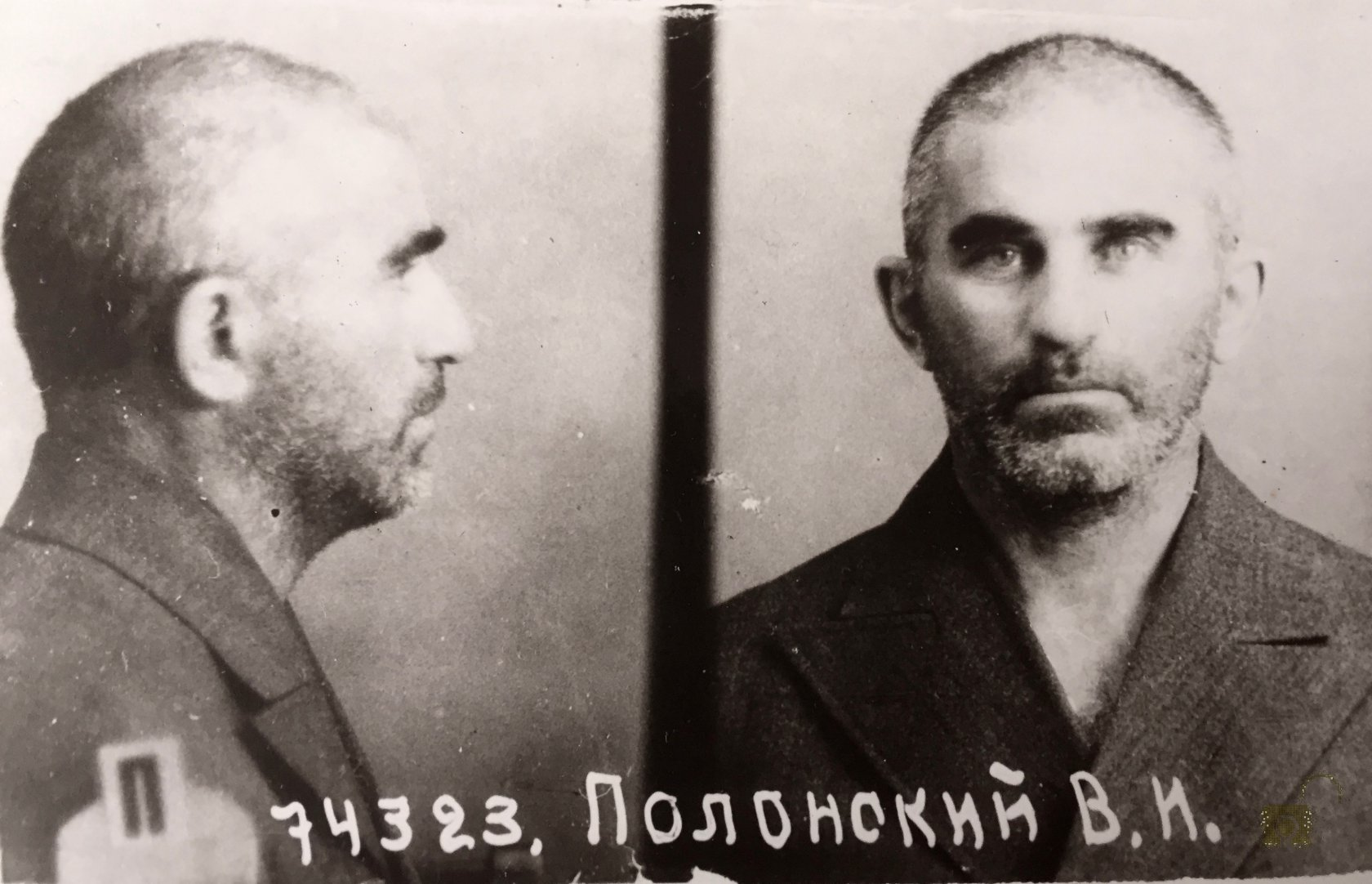
Portrait of Polonsky after his arrest by the NKVD

He was arrested on 22 June 1937. Claims that he was tortured are not accompanied by evidence. He was sentenced to death by the Military Tribunal of USSR and executed by firing squad on 30 October 1937 in Lubyanka prison.

== Awards ==
Polonsky was awarded the Order of the Red Banner of Labour.

Party political offices
Preceded by Nikolay Gikalo	First Secretary of the Azerbaijan Communist Party; 1930–1933	Succeeded by Ruben Rubenov
