= Azerbaijan Communist Party (1920) =

1920–1991 ruling party of Azerbaijan

Azerbaijan Communist Party Azərbaycan Kommunist Partiyası Азәрбајҹан Коммунист Партијасы
- Founded: 20 February 1920
- Dissolved: 14 September 1991
- Merger of: Ahrar Party; Baku Bolsheviks; Adalat; Hummat
- Succeeded by: Azerbaijan Communist Party (1993)
- Ideology: Communism; Marxism–Leninism
- National affiliation: Communist Party of the Soviet Union
- Colors: Red
- Supreme Soviet (1990): 280 / 360 (78%)

Party flag

The Azerbaijan Communist Party (Azerbaijani: Azərbaycan Kommunist Partiyası; Russian: Коммунистическая партия Азербайджана, romanized: Kommunisticheskaya partiya Azerbaydzhana) was the ruling political party in the Azerbaijan SSR, making it effectively a branch of the Communist Party of the Soviet Union. It was formed on 20 February 1920, when the Muslim Social Democratic Party, Adalat Party, Ahrar Party and the Baku Bolsheviks joined together to establish the Communist Party of Azerbaijan. On 1 April of the same year, the Fifth Cabinet of Ministers of the Azerbaijan Democratic Republic gave its resignations and all the power to the Communist Party of Azerbaijan. The party ruled the Azerbaijan SSR until 14 September 1991 when it was formally disbanded. Nevertheless, former leaders and members of the communists continued to play a role in the family- and patronage-based political system. The Communist Party of Azerbaijan won the first multi-party elections in Azerbaijan that took place on 30 September and 14 October 1990 for the Supreme Soviet, obtaining 280 out of 360 seats.

== First secretaries of the Communist Party of Azerbaijan ==
No.	Name	Took office	Left office
1	Mirza Davud Huseynov (Note: Held position of Chairmen of the Presidium of the Central Committee, not First Secretary) (1894–1938)	12 February 1920	23 October 1920
2	Grigory Kaminsky (Note: Held position of Responsible Secretary, not First Secretary) (1895–1938)	23 October 1920	July 1921
3	Sergey Kirov (1886–1934)	July 1921	January 1926
4	Levon Mirzoyan (1897–1939)	January 1926	August 1929
5	Nikolay Gikalo (1897–1938)	August 1929	June 1930
6	Vladimir Polonsky (1893–1937)	June 1930	November 1933
7	Ruben Rubenov (Mkrtchyan) (1894–1937)	1 January 1933	12 December 1933
8	Mir Jafar Baghirov (1896–1956)	November 1933	July 1953
9	Mir Teymur Yaqubov (1904–1970)	July 1953	February 1954
10	Imam Mustafayev (1910–1997)	7 February 1954	12 June 1959
11	Veli Akhundov (1916–1986)	11 July 1959	14 July 1969
12	Heydar Aliyev (1923–2003)	14 July 1969	3 December 1982
13	Kamran Baghirov (1933–2000)	3 December 1982	21 May 1988
14	Abdulrahman Vezirov (1930–2022)	21 May 1988	20 January 1990
15	Ayaz Mütallibov (1938–2022)	24 January 1990	14 September 1991
Source: World Statesman – Azerbaijan

== Notable people ==
- Valery Grigoryan, former party chairman
