= Azerbaijan Soviet Socialist Republic =

Soviet republic from 1922 to 1991

Coordinates: 40.3°N 47.7°E

Azerbaijan Soviet Socialist Republic (Note: Historical names: 1920–1922: Azerbaijan Socialist Soviet Republic (Azerbaijani: Azərbajcan Sosjalist Ɜyra Cumhyrijjəti; Russian: Азербайджанская Социалистическая Советская Республика)) (1920–1922; 1936–1991) Азәрбајҹан Совет Сосиалист Республикасы (Azerbaijani) Азербайджанская Советская Социалистическая Республика (Russian) Republic of Azerbaijan (Note: Name from 5 February 1991) (1991) Azərbaycan Respublikası (Azerbaijani) Азербайджанская Республика (Russian)
- 1920–1991
- Flag (1952–1991) State emblem (1978–1991)
- Motto: Бүтүн өлкәләрин пролетарлары, бирләшин! (Azerbaijani) "Bütün ölkələrin proletarları, birləşin!" (transliteration) "Proletarians of all countries, unite!"
- Anthem: Azərbaycan marşı "March of Azerbaijan" (1920–1922) Азәрбајҹан Совет Сосиалист Республикасынын Һимни; Azərbaycan Sovet Sosialist Respublikasının Himni "Anthem of the Azerbaijan Soviet Socialist Republic" (from 1944)
- Location of Azerbaijan (red) within the Soviet Union
- Status: 1920–1922: Nominally independent state (satellite state of the Russian SFSR); 1922–1936: Part of the Transcaucasian SFSR; 1936–1989: Union republic of the Soviet Union; 1989–1991: Union Republic with priority of the Azerbaijani legislation
- Capital: Baku
- Common languages: Official languages: Azerbaijani · Russian; Minority languages: Armenian · Lezgin · Talysh · Tat
- Religion: Secular state (de jure); State atheism (de facto); Shia Islam (majority)
- Demonyms: Azerbaijani; Soviet
- Government: 1920–1990: Unitary communist state; 1990–1991: Unitary presidential republic
- First Secretary
  - 1920 (first): Mirza Davud Huseynov (Note: As "Chairman of the Presidium of the Central Committee of the Communist Party (Bolsheviks) of Azerbaijan")
  - 1990–1991 (last): Ayaz Mutallibov
- Head of State
  - 1920 (first): Mirza Davud Huseynov (Note: As "Chairman of the Provisional Revolutionary Committee")
  - 1989–1990: Elmira Gafarova (Note: As "Chairperson of the Presidium of the Supreme Soviet")
  - 1990–1991 (last): Ayaz Mutallibov (Note: As "President of the Azerbaijan Soviet Socialist Republic")
- Head of Government
  - 1920–1922 (first): Nariman Narimanov
  - 1990–1991 (last): Hasan Hasanov
- Legislature: Supreme Soviet
- History
  - Republic proclaimed: 28 April 1920
  - Becomes part of the Transcaucasian SFSR: 12 March 1922
  - Re-established as a Union Republic of the USSR: 5 December 1936
  - First Nagorno-Karabakh War: 20 February 1988
  - State sovereignty: 23 September 1989
  - Black January: 19–20 January 1990
  - Renamed to the Republic of Azerbaijan: 5 February 1991
  - Independence declared: 18 October 1991
  - Azerbaijan’s international recognition (dissolution of the Soviet Union): 26 December 1991

Population
  - 1989 census: 7,037,867
- Currency: Soviet rouble (Rbl) (SUR)
- Calling code: +7 892/895
Preceded by
1920: Azerbaijan Democratic Republic
1921: Republic of Mountainous Armenia
1936: Transcaucasian Socialist Federative Soviet Republic
Succeeded by
1922: Transcaucasian Socialist Federative Soviet Republic
1991: Azerbaijan
Republic of Nagorno-Karabakh
- Today part of: Azerbaijan

The Azerbaijan Soviet Socialist Republic, (Note: Azerbaijani: Азәрбајҹан Совет Сосиалист Республикасы, romanized: Azərbaycan Sovet Sosialist Respublikası; Russian: Азербайджанская Советская Социалистическая Республика, romanized: Azerbaydzhanskaya Sovetskaya Sotsialisticheskaya Respublika; (abbr. ASSR) also referred to as the Azerbaijani Soviet Socialist Republic, Azerbaijan SSR, Azerbaijani SSR, AzSSR, Soviet Azerbaijan or simply Azerbaijan) was one of the constituent republics of the Soviet Union between 1922 and 1991. Azerbaijan SSR was created on 28 April 1920 following the Red Army invasion of Azerbaijan. When the Russian Soviet Federative Socialist Republic brought pro-Soviet figures to power in the region, the first two years of the Azerbaijani SSR were as an nominally independent country until incorporation into the Transcaucasian SFSR, along with the Armenian SSR and the Georgian SSR.

In December 1922, the Transcaucasian SFSR became part of the newly established Soviet Union. The Constitution of Azerbaijan SSR was approved by the 9th Extraordinary All-Azerbaijani Congress of Soviets on 14 March 1937. On 5 February 1991, Azerbaijan SSR was renamed the Republic of Azerbaijan according to the Decision No.16-XII of the Supreme Soviet of Azerbaijan approving the Decree of the President of Azerbaijan SSR dated 29 November 1990, remained in the USSR for the period before the declaration of independence in October 1991.

== Etymology ==
The name "Azerbaijan" originates as the "Land of Atropates", an Achaemenid then Hellenistic-era king over a region in present-day Iranian Azarbaijan and Iranian Kurdistan, south of the modern state. Despite this difference, the present name was chosen by the Musavat to replace the Russian names Transcaucasia and Baku in 1918. "Azerbaijan" derives from Persian Āzarbāydjān, from earlier Ādharbāyagān and Ādharbādhagān, from Middle Persian Āturpātākān, from Old Persian Atropatkan.

Some sources state that, prior to 1918, the name Azerbaijan was exclusively used to identify the Iranian province of Azerbaijan, located south of the Aras River. However, there are instances of the term Azerbaijan being used for the territories north of the Aras River in earlier times. In his (sometimes contradictory) references to Azerbaijan's borders, the 13th-century Muslim geographer Yaqut al-Hamawi at one point extends them to the Kura River, encompassing the region known as Arran. According to Xavier de Planhol, this indicates that "from this period the conception of Azarbaijan tended to be extended to the north and that its meaning was being rapidly transformed." In the Safavid era, Azerbaijan designated territories both north and south of the Aras River. In the late 18th century, Russian, Armenian, and Persian sources used the term Azerbaijan in reference to the territories north of the Aras—without, however, attaching a specific ethnic association to the term. For example, in his letter dated June 5, 1798, to King George XII of Georgia, Fath-Ali Shah Qajar referred to Georgia as "the best land in Azerbaijan", while in 1783 the Russian general S. D. Burnashev wrote of the "characteristic rebelliousness of the peoples of Azerbaijan" in connection with the Erivan Khanate.

From its founding, it was officially known as the Azerbaijan Socialist Soviet Republic. When the Transcaucasian Socialist Federative Soviet Republic was abolished, its name was changed to the Azerbaijan Soviet Socialist Republic, according to the 1937 and 1978 Constitutions of the Azerbaijan SSR. Upon gaining state sovereignty, it was renamed the Republic of Azerbaijan (or Azerbaijani Republic) in 1991.

== History ==
=== Establishment ===
The Azerbaijan SSR was established on 28 April 1920 after the surrender of the government of the Azerbaijan Democratic Republic to local Bolsheviks led by Mirza Davud Huseynov and Nariman Narimanov and the invasion of the Bolshevik 11th Red Army.

On 13 October 1921, the Soviet republics of Russia, Armenia, Azerbaijan, and Georgia signed an agreement with Turkey known as the Treaty of Kars. The previously independent Nakhcivan SSR would also become an autonomous ASSR within Azerbaijan by the Treaty of Kars.

Borders of Azerbaijan and Armenia, like elsewhere in the USSR, were redrawn several times, yet neither side was completely satisfied with the results.

=== Transcaucasian SFSR ===
On 12 March 1922 the leaders of Azerbaijan, Armenian, and Georgian Soviet Socialist Republics established a union known as the Transcaucasian Soviet Federal Socialist Republic (TSFSR). This was the first attempt at a union of Soviet republics, preceding the USSR. The Union Council of TSFSR consisted of the representatives of the three republics – Nariman Narimanov (Azerbaijan), Polikarp Mdivani (Georgia), and Aleksandr Fyodorovich Miasnikyan (Armenia). The First Secretary of the Transcaucasian Communist Party was Sergo Ordzhonikidze.

In December 1922 TSFSR agreed to join the union with Russia, Ukraine, and Belarus, thus creating the Union of Soviet Socialist Republics which would last until 1991. The TSFSR, however, did not last long. In December 1936, the Transcaucasian Union was dismantled when the leaders in the Union Council found themselves unable to come to agreement over several issues. Azerbaijan, Armenia, and Georgia then each became a republic of the Soviet Union directly.

=== Economy and development ===
In the spring of 1921, a general change-over from revkoms and kombeds to Soviets took place. In order to help the Azerbaijani oil industry the Supreme Council of the National Economy decided in the same year to provide it with everything necessary out of turn. The new oilfields, like Ilyich bay, Qaraçuxur, Lökbatan and Qala have been discovered. By 1929, a significant kolkhoz movement had developed and Azerbaijan became the second Soviet tea producer after the Georgian SSR for the first time. On 31 March 1931, the oil industry of the Azerbaijan SSR, which supplied over 60% of the total Soviet oil production at the time, was awarded the Order of Lenin. The republic gained the second Order on 15 March 1935 during the observation of its 15th anniversary. By the end of the second five-year plan (1933–1937) Azerbaijan had become the 3rd republic in the Soviet Union by its capital investment size.

=== World War II ===
From 17 September 1939 to 21 June 1941, Nazi Germany, due to its non-aggression pact and relatively normalized trade relations with the USSR, was a major importer of oil produced in the Azerbaijan Soviet Socialist Republic.

This changed when Germany invaded the Soviet Union on 22 June 1941. In the first year of the Soviet-German War, Azerbaijan produced 23.5 million tons of oil—a record for the entire history of its oil industry. By the end of 1941, thousands of Azerbaijanis had joined the People's Volunteer Corps. Mobilization affected all spheres of life, particularly the oil industries. A week after fighting began, the oil workers themselves took the initiative to extend their work to 12-hour shifts, with no days off, including holidays and vacations, until the end of the war.

In September 1942, Hitler's generals presented him with a large decorated cake depicting the Caspian Sea and Baku. Baku then became the primary strategic goal of Hitler's 1942 Fall Blau offensive. This offensive was unsuccessful, however. The German army reached the mountains of the Caucasus, but was at the same time decisively defeated at the Battle of Stalingrad and thus forced to retreat from the area, abandoning all hopes for a Reichskommissariat Kaukasien. In 1942, Azerbaijan also became the second-largest tea producer of the Soviet Army. By the decree of the Supreme Soviet of the USSR in February 1942, the commitment of more than 500 workers and employees of the oil industry of Azerbaijan was awarded orders and medals. Of the estimated 600,000 Azerbaijanis who were recruited into the Soviet Army during the war, 290,000 died.

=== Post-war period ===
An event that greatly impacted Azerbaijanis on both sides of the border was the Soviet occupation of Iranian Azerbaijan in the summer of 1941. The Soviet military presence south of the Aras River led to a revival of Pan-Azerbaijani nationalism. During the Soviet occupation, a revival of the Azerbaijani literary language, which had largely been supplanted by Persian, was promoted with the help of writers, journalists, and teachers from Soviet Azerbaijan. In November 1945, with Soviet backing, an autonomous "Azerbaijan People's Government" was set up at Tabriz under Ja'far Pishevari, the leader of the Azerbaijani Democratic Party. Secular cultural institutions and education in Azerbaijani blossomed throughout Iranian Azerbaijan, and speculation grew rife about a possible unification of the two Azerbaijani republics, under Soviet control. As it turned out, the issue of Iranian Azerbaijan became one of the first conflicts of the Cold War, and under pressure from the Western powers, the Soviet army was withdrawn. The Iranian government regained control over Iranian Azerbaijan by the end of 1946, and the Democratic Party leaders took refuge in Soviet Azerbaijan. Ja'far Pishevari, who was never fully trusted by Stalin, soon died under mysterious circumstances.

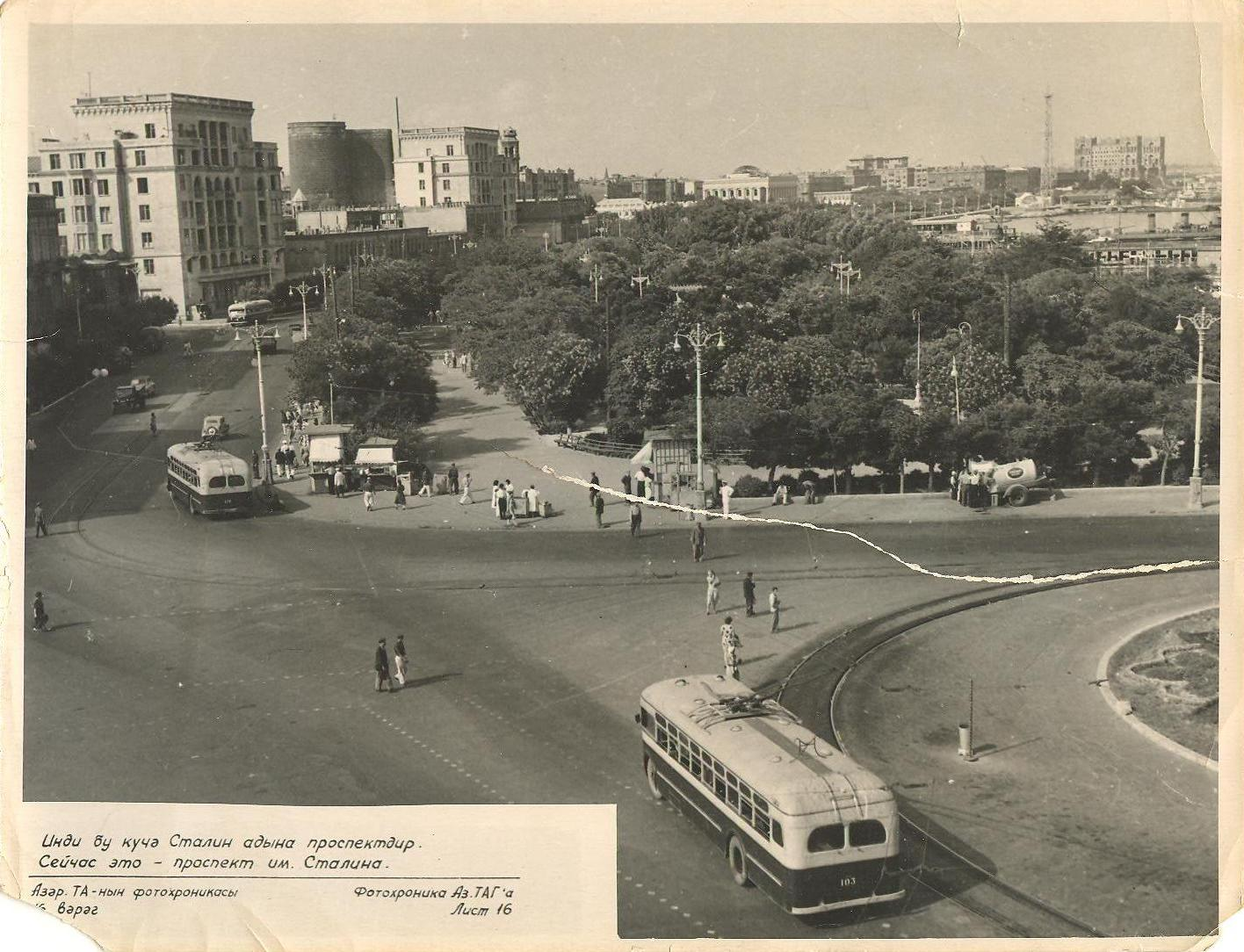
Baku in the early 1950s

Apart from the Oil Rocks, Azerbaijan's first offshore oil field was opened in the early 1950s. Policies of de-Stalinization and improvement after the 1950s led to better education and welfare conditions for most of Azerbaijan. This also coincided with the period of rapid urbanization and industrialization. During this period of change, a new anti-Islamic drive and return to a policy of Russification, under the policy of sblizheniye (rapprochement), was instituted in order to merge all the peoples of the USSR into a new monolithic Soviet nation.

=== Pre-secession ===
In the 1960s, signs of a structural crisis in the Soviet system began to emerge. Azerbaijan's crucial oil industry lost its relative importance in the Soviet economy, partly because of a shift of oil production to other regions of the Soviet Union and partly because of the depletion of known oil resources accessible from land, while offshore production was not deemed cost-effective. As a result, Azerbaijan had the lowest rate of growth in productivity and economic output among the Soviet republics, with the exception of Tajikistan. Ethnic tensions, particularly between Armenians and Azerbaijanis began to grow, but the violence was suppressed. In an attempt to end the growing structural crisis, the government in Moscow appointed Heydar Aliyev as the first secretary of the Communist Party of Azerbaijan in 1969. Aliyev temporarily improved the economic conditions and promoted alternative industries to the declining oil industry, such as cotton. He also consolidated the republic's ruling elite, which now consisted almost entirely of ethnic Azerbaijanis, thus reverting the previous trends of sblizheniye. In 1982 Aliyev was made a member of the Communist Party's Politburo in Moscow. In 1987, when perestroika was implemented, he was forced to retire by Soviet leader Mikhail Gorbachev, whose reform policies he opposed.

=== Secession ===
In the Gorbachev era, the late 1980s were characterized by increasing unrest in the Caucasus, initially over the Nagorno-Karabakh issue. The ethnic strife revealed the shortcomings of the Communist Party as a champion of national interests and, in the spirit of glasnost, independent publications and political organizations began to emerge. Of these organizations, by far the most prominent was the Popular Front of Azerbaijan (PFA), which by the fall of 1989 had a lot of popular support. The movement supported independence from the USSR.

Flag of Azerbaijan in 1991 before the collapse of the Soviet Union

The unrest culminated in a crackdown by the Red army which aimed at silencing the demands for independence. At least 132 demonstrators were killed and other civilians in Baku injured on 20 January 1990.

Azerbaijan participated in the union-wide referendum to preserve the union as the Union of Soviet Sovereign Republics but with different constitutional arrangements. The referendum was passed by 93.3% of valid polls. The Armenian SSR did not participate in the referendum. The Supreme Soviet of the exclave of the Nakhichevan Autonomous Soviet Socialist Republic also decided not to participate in the referendum. The Azerbaijani Popular Front Party argued that only 15% of the electorate had participated in the referendum.

The "Treaty of the Union of Sovereign States" failed to be ratified because the 1991 Soviet coup d'état attempt accelerated declarations of independence by Soviet Socialist Republics between August and December. Azerbaijan adopted its declaration of independence on 18 October 1991. The final dissolution of the Soviet Union took place on 26 December 1991. Shortly before that date, the Azerbaijan joined the Commonwealth of Independent States.

By the end of 1991 fighting in Nagorno-Karabakh had escalated into a full-scale war, which culminated into a tense 1994 cease-fire that persisted into the 21st century. Azerbaijani success in the war of 2020 and a further successful offensive in 2023 led to the restoration of Azerbaijan’s territorial integrity.

== Government ==
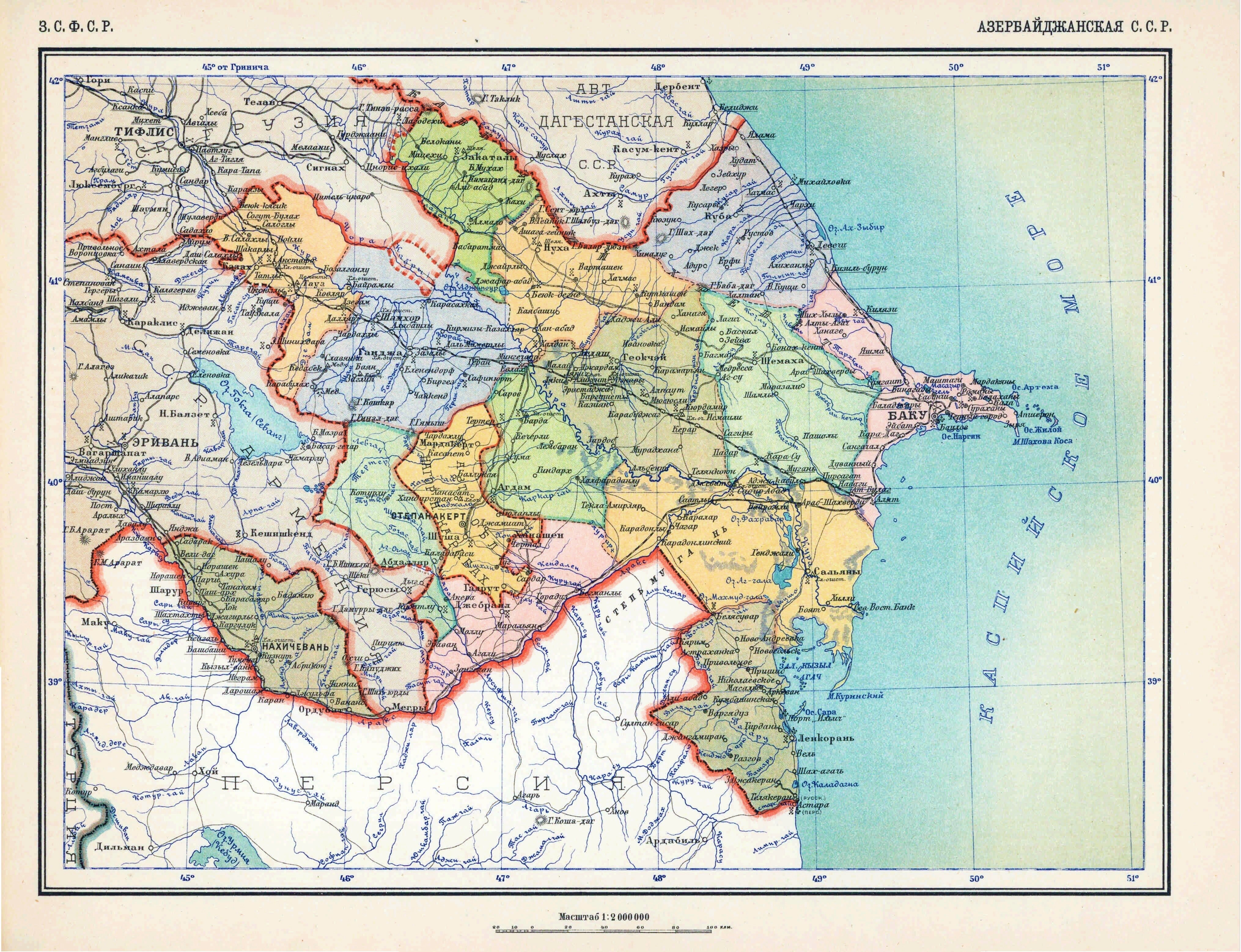
The administrative divisions of the Azerbaijan Soviet Socialist Republic

On 28 April 1920, Temporary Revolutionary Committee took control over the country, and formed a government named Council of People's Commissars of Azerbaijan SSR.

After the approval of the Constitution of Azerbaijan SSR by the All-Azerbaijan Congress of Soviets in 1921, Azerbaijan Revolutionary Committee was revoked and Central Executive Committee was selected as a supreme legislative body.

According to the Constitution Azerbaijan SSR in 1937, the legislative body switched to a new phase. Central Executive Committee was replaced with Supreme Soviet.

=== Heads of state ===
- Sergey Kirov (1921–1926)
- Levon Mirzoyan (1926–1929)
- Ruhulla Akhundov (1925–1926)
- Mir Jafar Baghirov (1933–1953)
- Imam Mustafayev (1954–1959)
- Veli Akhundov (1959–1969)
- Heydar Aliyev (1969–1982)
- Kamran Baghirov (1982–1988)
- Abdurrahman Vazirov (1988–1990)
- Ayaz Mutallibov (1990–1991)

==== Chairmen of the Central Executive Committee ====
- Mukhtar Gajiyev (1921–1922)
- Samed Aliyev (1922–1929)
- Gazanfar Musabekov (1929–1931)
- Sultan Medjid Efendiev (1932–1937)
- Mir Bashir Gasimov (1937–1938)

==== President of the Azerbaijan Soviet Socialist Republic ====
- Ayaz Mutallibov (1990–1991)

== Military ==
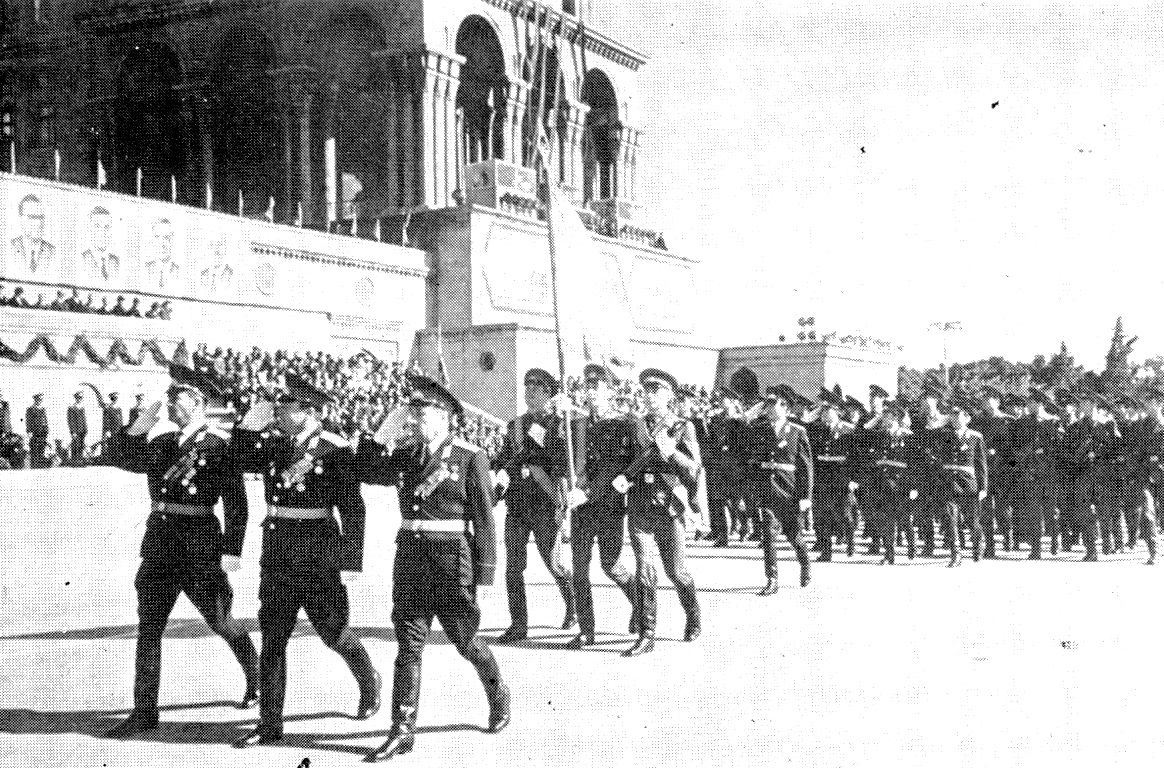
A parade on Lenin Square in Baku in honor of the 50th anniversary of the founding of Soviet Azerbaijan, October 1970

Under the military structure of the former Soviet Union, Azerbaijan shortly before gaining independence, was host to over 60,000 Soviet military personnel deployed throughout the country in units of the Ground Forces, Air Forces, Air Defense Forces, and Navy. The primary combat formation of Ground Forces in Azerbaijan was the 4th Army, which housed its headquarters and various support units in Baku. In addition to the independent surface-to-air missile (SAM), artillery, and SCUD brigades, the principal combat elements of the Fourth Army were the 23rd (Ganja), 295th (Lenkaran), 60th (Baku) and 75th (Nakhchivan) motorized rifle divisions (MRD), and the Ganja Helicopter Assault Regiment (Mi-24 Hinds and Mi-8 Hips). The only ground forces training establishment in Azerbaijan was the Baku Higher Combined Arms Command School. Military conscription in the Azerbaijan SSR was introduced only after the establishment of Soviet control, with the number of people being called up for service being minimal at first.

== Legacy ==
In a 2016 survey, 69% of Azerbaijanis believed life was better under the USSR.
