= 2020 Azerbaijani parliamentary election =

- 9 February 2020
- All 125 seats in the National Assembly; 63 seats needed for a majority
Party	Leader	Vote %	Seats	+/–
New Azerbaijan	Ilham Aliyev	41.84	70	+1
Civic Solidarity	Sabir Rustamkhanli	1.16	3	+1
BAXCP	Gudrat Gasanguliev	0.69	1	0
Great Order	Fazil Mustafa	0.68	1	0
Motherland	Fazail Agamali	0.54	1	0
Civic Unity	Sabir Hacıyev	0.51	1	0
Unity	Tahir Kərimli	0.49	1	0
ADMP	Elşən Musayev	0.39	1	0
DİP	Asim Mollazadə	0.24	1	0
Independents	–	49.55	41	−2
This lists parties that won seats. See the complete results below.
Speaker before	Speaker after
Ogtay Asadov	Sahiba Gafarova

Parliamentary elections were held in Azerbaijan on 9 February 2020. They were originally scheduled to take place in November 2020, but were brought forward after parliament was dissolved in December 2019. Opposition parties accused President Ilham Aliyev of limiting their ability to campaign and called for a boycott of the election.

The ruling New Azerbaijan Party retained its majority, winning 72 of the 125 seats, although this was later reduced to 70 when results in two constituencies were annulled. The second largest party (the Civic Solidarity Party) won only three seats.

== Electoral system ==
The 125 members of the National Assembly were elected in single-member constituencies using the first-past-the-post system.

== Campaign ==
A total of 1,314 candidates contested the elections; 1,057 ran as independents, with 246 running as candidates of 19 different parties and 11 as nominees of initiative groups.

Although a significant part of the opposition boycotted the elections, some parties (e.g. Musavat) announced that they would participate.

== Results ==
The New Azerbaijan Party was initially reported to have won 72 seats, with 43 taken by independents. However, the results in four constituencies were later annulled by the Election Commission, with the New Azerbaijan Party and independents both losing two seats.

Erkin Gadirli of the Republican Alternative Party won a seat running as an independent.

Razi Nurullayev, the chairman of the splinter group from Azerbaijani Popular Front Party won a seat running as an independent.

Party	Votes	%	Seats	+/–
New Azerbaijan Party	976,163	41.84	70	+1
Musavat	38,714	1.66	0	0
Civic Solidarity Party	27,121	1.16	3	+1
Whole Azerbaijan Popular Front Party	16,189	0.69	1	0
Great Order Party	15,846	0.68	1	0
Motherland Party	12,587	0.54	1	0
Civic Unity Party	11,983	0.51	1	0
Unity Party	11,347	0.49	1	0
Azerbaijan Democratic Enlightenment Party	9,004	0.39	1	0
Azerbaijan Hope Party	7,565	0.32	0	0
Modern Musavat Party	6,844	0.29	0	New
Azerbaijan National Independence Party	6,688	0.29	0	0
United Azerbaijan Party	6,358	0.27	0	New
Azerbaijan Democrat Party	6,110	0.26	0	0
Democratic Reforms Party	5,533	0.24	1	0
National Revival Movement Party	4,980	0.21	0	–1
Azerbaijan Free Republican Party	2,637	0.11	0	New
Azerbaijan People's Party	2,330	0.10	0	0
Azerbaijan Social Prosperity Party	1,508	0.06	0	–1
Democratic Azerbaijani World Party	1,202	0.05	0	0
National Unity Party	1,163	0.05	0	New
Intellectuals Party	1,029	0.04	0	New
Azerbaijan Communist Party	957	0.04	0	0
Great Azerbaijan Party	834	0.04	0	0
Citizen and Development Party	798	0.03	0	0
Justice Party	766	0.03	0	0
Azerbaijan Liberal Democratic Party	638	0.03	0	New
Azerbaijan Fighters Party	74	0.00	0	New
Independents	1,155,884	49.55	41	–2
Invalidated			4	–
Total	2,332,852	100.00	125	0
Valid votes	2,332,852	92.94		
Invalid/blank votes	177,283	7.06		
Total votes	2,510,135	100.00		
Registered voters/turnout	5,359,015	46.84		
Source: MSK, IPU

=== By constituency ===
Results by constituency
Constituency	Candidate	Party	Votes
District Nº 1	Vasif Yusif Talibov	New Azerbaijan Party	27.712
District Nº 1	Etibar Nəsrulla Məmmədov	Great Order Party	966
District Nº 1	Mirvəli Mircəlil Seyidov	Independent	615
District Nº 2	Isa Əkbər Həbibbəyli	New Azerbaijan Party	26.583
District Nº 2	Sabir Rəcəb Eyvazov	Independent	2.710
District Nº 2	Ziyad Isa Allahverdiyev	Azerbaijan Social Prosperity Party	1.508
District Nº 3	Səttar Suliddin Möhbaliyev	Independent	24.887
District Nº 3	Nəriman Qəhrəman Quliyev	New Azerbaijan Party	3.021
District Nº 3	Hüseynqulu Həsənqulu Bədəlov	New Azerbaijan Party	2.003
District Nº 4	Eldar Rza Ibrahimov	New Azerbaijan Party	27.158
District Nº 4	Nubar Ilham Quliyeva	Great Order Party	3.455
District Nº 4	Bəhruz Abbas Məmmədov	Independent	1.375
District Nº 5	Siyavuş Dünyamali Novruzov	New Azerbaijan Party	16.785
District Nº 5	Qədir Vahid Məmmədov	Independent	2.194
District Nº 5	Ramin Izzət Haciyev	Independent	1.056
District Nº 5	Mehriban Vəli Həsənova	Independent	662
District Nº 6	Ülviyyə Tapdiq Həmzəyeva	New Azerbaijan Party	16.569
District Nº 6	Hicran Həsən Həsənov	Independent	2.839
District Nº 6	Mətləb Məhərrəm Aslanov	United Azerbaijan Party	2.099
District Nº 6	Rəhman Caməmməd Şahvəliyev	Independent	1.185
District Nº 6	Abdulla Qadir Məhərrəmov	Independent	1.144
District Nº 7	Cəbi Hüseyn Quliyev	New Azerbaijan Party	14.255
District Nº 7	Yəhya Məmməd Babanli	Independent	4.179
District Nº 7	Etibar Cəfər Fərəcov	Independent	2.180
District Nº 7	Kamal Lütvəli Lütvəliyev	Independent	1.818
District Nº 8	Azay Əjdər Quliyev	Independent	6.396
District Nº 8	Kubra Məhəmməd Əliyarli	New Azerbaijan Party	3.411
District Nº 8	Arzu Həbib Səmədbəyli	Musavat	918
District Nº 8	Xəyal Xasay Məmmədxanli	Independent	898
District Nº 8	Ağasif Şakir Ibrahimov	Independent	509
District Nº 8	Nərminə Şaban Cəfərova	Independent	343
District Nº 8	Gülarə Həmid Hüseynova	Independent	321
District Nº 8	Nazilə Süleyman Əhmədova	Independent	296
District Nº 8	Cabbar Bayram Bayramov	Independent	261
District Nº 8	Vüsal Rəhman Zülfüqarov	Independent	238
District Nº 8	Kənan Rasim Eminbəyli	Independent	188
District Nº 8	Rafiq Xaliq Imanov	Independent	161
District Nº 8	Rufət Salman Rəhimov	Independent	145
District Nº 8	Şahmurad Zöhtün Məmmədov	Independent	125
District Nº 9	Kamaləddin Nəsrəddin Qafarov	New Azerbaijan Party	10.364
District Nº 9	Aqşin Vəli Həbibov	Independent	1.175
District Nº 9	Elşad Nəbi Musayev	Great Azerbaijan Party	666
District Nº 9	Şəhriyar Nəbi Bayramov	Independent	604
District Nº 9	Əli Məhəmməd Orucov	Azerbaijan National Independence Party	512
District Nº 9	Günel Məhərrəm Səfərova	Independent	494
District Nº 9	Anar Əliyar Əliyev	Independent	488
District Nº 9	Akif Qazax Naği	Independent	453
District Nº 9	Ülvi Fəxrəddin Həsənov	Independent	446
District Nº 9	Rəşad Rafiq Rzayev	Independent	443
District Nº 9	Rəna Qasim Əliyeva	Independent	382
District Nº 9	Nemət Ağa Kərimli	Musavat	341
District Nº 9	Əpoş Islam Vəliyev	Independent	284
District Nº 9	Elnur Rafiq Qasimov	Independent	280
District Nº 9	Aybəniz Səttar Məmmədova	Independent	275
District Nº 10	Madər Əliəsgər Musayev	Independent	10.644
District Nº 10	Anar Məmməd Əliyev	New Azerbaijan Party	1.475
District Nº 10	Könül Vaqif Ismayilova	Modern Musavat Party	918
District Nº 10	Rəbiyyə Ilqar Məmmədova	Independent	708
District Nº 10	Kəramət Əli Zeynalov	Independent	665
District Nº 10	Gülağa Qulam Aslanli	Musavat	531
District Nº 10	Qorxmaz Əbülfəz Ibrahimli	Intellectuals Party	500
District Nº 10	Iltifat Hacixan Soltanov	Independent	373
District Nº 10	Müşfiq Məhəmmədiyə Əliyev	Independent	360
District Nº 10	Qaryağdi Qərib Əsədov	Independent	298
District Nº 10	Bünyamin Nağdəli Qəmbərli	Whole Azerbaijan Popular Front Party	180
District Nº 11	Aydin Nəsir Hüseynov	New Azerbaijan Party	8.734
District Nº 11	Səxavət Şirsoltan Soltanli	Musavat	1.470
District Nº 11	Kamil Əşrəf Paşayev	Independent	1.276
District Nº 11	Samir Adil Məmmədov	Independent	560
District Nº 11	Gülər Əlikrəm Bəbirova	Independent	552
District Nº 11	Məmməd Mirzəxan Haciyev	Independent	433
District Nº 11	Hamlet Ağalar Alişov	Independent	413
District Nº 11	Xəyalə Rasim Qurbanova	Independent	391
District Nº 11	Əlövsət Əli Əliyev	Independent	364
District Nº 12	Səbinə Səməd Xasayeva	New Azerbaijan Party	4.852
District Nº 12	Natiq Mehman Cəfərov	Independent	1.128
District Nº 12	Aidə Rəcəb Şirinova	Independent	921
District Nº 12	Kərim Sevindik Kərimli	Independent	404
District Nº 12	Niyaməddin Orduxan Orduxanov	Whole Azerbaijan Popular Front Party	401
District Nº 12	Əkbər Mehdi Yolçuyev	Independent	400
District Nº 12	Orxan Rəvayət Mütəllimov	Independent	370
District Nº 12	Pərvin Çingiz Babayeva	Independent	332
District Nº 12	Reyhan Təvəkkül Hacizadə	Independent	201
District Nº 12	Əlirza Əlican Kərimli	Independent	186
District Nº 12	Eltun Fərəc Ibrahimov	Independent	173
District Nº 12	Elman Fizuli Quliyev	Musavat	154
District Nº 12	Şamil Ehtibar Rzayev	Independent	129
District Nº 12	Rüfət Canəli Rzayev	United Azerbaijan Party	107
District Nº 12	Elxan Eyvaz Isazadə	Independent	104
District Nº 12	Turabxan Rafiq Turabxanli	Independent	102
District Nº 13	Rauf Asif Əliyev	New Azerbaijan Party	11.609
District Nº 13	Gülmirzə Fəxrəddin Cavadov	Independent	7.621
District Nº 13	Əhmədəli Məmmədağa Məmmədov	Independent	1.079
District Nº 13	Nərmin Anar Yusifova	Independent	750
District Nº 13	Səbuhi Vaqif Rəcəb	Independent	565
District Nº 13	Faiq Baba Əli Səlimov	Independent	516
District Nº 13	Araz Heydər Hüseynli	Independent	397
District Nº 13	Niyaz Eynulla Nəsirov	Musavat	353
District Nº 13	Nasir Şirbala Əliyev	Independent	299
District Nº 13	Kamran Həsən Tağiyev	Independent	287
District Nº 13	Əli Məmməd Əliyev	Independent	235
District Nº 13	Aydin Hüseyn Ələkbərov	Independent	198
District Nº 13	Nərminə Samir Zeynalzadə	Independent	165
District Nº 13	Nailə Şamil Məmmədova	Independent	108
District Nº 13	Tahirə Seyfulla Quliyeva	Independent	104
District Nº 13	Nərgiz Məhərrəm Məhərrəmova	Independent	78
District Nº 13	Şadiman Nəriman Nərimansoy	Independent	49
District Nº 13	Tenqiz Telmanoviç Əliyev	Independent	29
District Nº 14	Soltan Teymur Məmmədov	Independent	13.122
District Nº 14	Şəfəq Firudin Əhmədova	New Azerbaijan Party	6.071
District Nº 14	Islam Güloğlan Əzimov	Independent	3.417
District Nº 14	Abid Abdin Qafarov	Independent	3.165
District Nº 14	Həsrət Qurbanəli Rüstəmov	Azerbaijan Democrat Party	1.573
District Nº 14	Səyyarə Hüseyn Xələfli	Independent	130
District Nº 14	Şəlalə Ağaməmməd Əsgərova	Independent	107
District Nº 14	Firdovsi Pənah Əliyev	Independent	106
District Nº 14	Gülnara Ağaverdi Əliyeva	Independent	94
District Nº 15	Ülvi Zahid Quliyev	Independent	3.357
District Nº 15	Azər Həmid Quliyev	Independent	1.283
District Nº 15	Yusif Kamil Seyfəlov	Independent	908
District Nº 15	Rauf Nəriman Nağiyev	New Azerbaijan Party	526
District Nº 15	Hürrü Əlimurad Əliyev	Independent	423
District Nº 15	Arif Mustafa Hacili	Musavat	264
District Nº 15	Sərdar Calal Məmmədov	Azerbaijan Democrat Party	199
District Nº 15	Nurlanə Nazim Quliyeva	Independent	136
District Nº 15	Mehriban Aslan Cəlilova	Independent	124
District Nº 15	Həyat Ilyas Eyyubova	Independent	124
District Nº 15	Nişat Əhməd Mehdiyev	Independent	111
District Nº 15	Babək Famil Bayramov	Independent	110
District Nº 15	Elşən Mansur Mustafayev	Azerbaijan National Independence Party	91
District Nº 15	Fərqanə Aydin Əliyeva	Independent	78
District Nº 15	Əziz Güloğlan Əliyev	Independent	74
District Nº 15	Səadət Ağadur Müslümova	Azerbaijan Fighters Party	74
District Nº 15	Nihad Natiq Qulamzadə	Independent	71
District Nº 15	Ilkin Həmid Həmidov	Independent	67
District Nº 15	Nicat Yaşar Kərimov	Independent	61
District Nº 15	Tamerlan Aydin Məmmədov	Independent	61
District Nº 15	Maral Əli Yusif Zamanova	Independent	53
District Nº 15	Elcan Vəliməmməd Məmmədli	Independent	42
District Nº 15	Əli Kamil Zeynalov	Independent	34
District Nº 16	Erkin Toğrul Qədirli	Independent	3.460
District Nº 16	Ilham Ilyas Səfərov	New Azerbaijan Party	1.806
District Nº 16	Ramin Sərdar Əhmədov	Independent	1.336
District Nº 16	Çingiz Ibrahim Bayramov	Independent	236
District Nº 16	Fəxrəddin Səməddin Babayev	Independent	233
District Nº 16	Tural Rafail Əfəndiyev	Independent	223
District Nº 16	Tahir Əşrəf Əliyev	Independent	220
District Nº 16	Minaya Dayanət Feyzullayeva	Independent	216
District Nº 16	Sevda Ələkbər Bədəlova	Independent	202
District Nº 16	Hüseynağa Faiq Hüseynov	Independent	192
District Nº 16	Almaz Əli Məmmədova	Musavat	184
District Nº 16	Vüqar Vaqif Əhmədov	Independent	169
District Nº 16	Elnara Fazil Hüseynova	Independent	168
District Nº 16	Elnur Sabir Fərzəliyev	Independent	162
District Nº 16	Araz Ramiz Əliquliyev	Independent	158
District Nº 16	Rafiq Lütfiyar Imanov	Independent	150
District Nº 16	Lalə Ismayil Məmmədova	Independent	147
District Nº 16	Güllər Xubyar Bəhrəmova	Independent	140
District Nº 16	Elmira Isa Əliyeva	Independent	125
District Nº 16	Elxan Rasim Əliyev	Independent	100
District Nº 16	Nərminə Şərif Qəribova	Independent	97
District Nº 17	Elnur Marat Allahverdiyev	New Azerbaijan Party	2.145
District Nº 17	Əli Nadir Əliyev	Citizen and Development Party	798
District Nº 17	Cavad Yusif Cavadov	Independent	702
District Nº 17	Azər Ağaqasim Qasimli	Independent	447
District Nº 17	Emil Rüfət Nəsirli	Independent	424
District Nº 17	Çinarə Gülməmməd Cəbrayilova	Independent	208
District Nº 17	Ayaz Ilham Məmmədov	Independent	155
District Nº 17	Yuliya Aleksandrovna Abdullayeva	Independent	141
District Nº 17	Ülvi Zakir Kazimov	Independent	57
District Nº 17	Nazilə Cahangir Soltanova	Azerbaijan Democrat Party	53
District Nº 17	Aygün Akif Qaziyeva	Independent	39
District Nº 17	Arif Vəli Əmrahov	Independent	35
District Nº 17	Fərid Cabir Əlizadə	Independent	30
District Nº 18	Rasim Nəsrəddin Musabəyov	Independent	7.946
District Nº 18	Ceyhun Salman Yusifov	Independent	4.095
District Nº 18	Xudaqulu Əhət Rzayev	New Azerbaijan Party	3.949
District Nº 18	Xaliq Isa Hüseynov	Independent	1.762
District Nº 18	Oqtay Yusif Qasimov	Independent	756
District Nº 18	Azər Balabəy Mazanov	Independent	340
District Nº 18	Gündüz Rafik Sadiqov	Independent	298
District Nº 18	Vüqar Hüseyn Həsənov	Independent	294
District Nº 18	Namik Yolu Niftiyev	Musavat	276
District Nº 18	Tural Sahib Məmmədzadə	Independent	211
District Nº 18	Əsab Ispəndiyar Əliyev	Independent	211
District Nº 18	Fərrux Dəmir Əsgərov	National Revival Movement Party	177
District Nº 18	Mahirə Sultan Nəsibova	Independent	105
District Nº 18	Xanlar Nüsrət Abbasov	Azerbaijan Hope Party	98
District Nº 19	Hikmət Baba Məmmədov	New Azerbaijan Party	5.551
District Nº 19	Isa Yunis Qəmbər	Musavat	1.984
District Nº 19	Kənan Qürbət Məmmədov	Independent	1.041
District Nº 19	Anar Azər Umudov	Independent	902
District Nº 19	Nicat Əlimürsəl Gözəlov	Independent	872
District Nº 19	Oruc Cavanşir Ibrahimov	Independent	729
District Nº 19	Ləman Ilham Cəfərzadə	Independent	585
District Nº 19	Vəliyəddin Fəxrəddin Quliyev	Independent	259
District Nº 19	Azər Arif Məmmədli	Independent	163
District Nº 19	Güloğlan Məhərrəm Cabbarov	Independent	131
District Nº 19	Sakit Məcid Məmmədov	Independent	109
District Nº 19	Mahir Həmzə Zeynalov	Whole Azerbaijan Popular Front Party	100
District Nº 19	Adil Məmməd Məmmədov	Independent	90
District Nº 19	Ülviyyə Fizuli Aslanova	Independent	83
District Nº 19	Şəmsəddin Həsən Allahverdiyev	Great Order Party	74
District Nº 19	Ülvi Taleh Şirinov	Independent	57
District Nº 20	Adil Abiş Əliyev	Independent	12.621
District Nº 20	Nihad Vüqar Allahyarli	New Azerbaijan Party	3.192
District Nº 20	Nərgiz Ilqar Mahmudova	Independent	1.109
District Nº 20	Elmar Islam Süleymanov	Independent	931
District Nº 20	Məhsəti Əli Hüseynova	Independent	803
District Nº 20	Valeh Hümmət Əliyev	Musavat	696
District Nº 20	Gülçin Adil Quliyeva	Independent	492
District Nº 20	Turana Mahmud Tağiyeva	Independent	464
District Nº 20	Mikayil Müşviq Məmmədov	Independent	370
District Nº 20	Afaq Firudin Əhmədova	Independent	129
District Nº 20	Rəşad Gülağa Şərifzadə	Civic Solidarity Party	128
District Nº 20	Emil Möhtəbər Həsənov	Independent	96
District Nº 21	Məlahət Ibrahim Ibrahimqizi	New Azerbaijan Party	5.613
District Nº 21	Fərhad Sovet Mehdiyev	Independent	1.518
District Nº 21	Toğrul Şahin Ismayilov	Independent	545
District Nº 21	Pəri Vaqif Qasimova	Independent	462
District Nº 21	Tural Feyruz Abbasli	United Azerbaijan Party	401
District Nº 21	Kamran Yusif Əliyev	Independent	342
District Nº 21	Afər Cəmaləddin Şirvanli	Musavat	288
District Nº 21	Elsevər Möysüm Mehdiyev	Independent	267
District Nº 21	Rəşid Cəmşid Həsənov	Independent	230
District Nº 21	Vəli Məmməd Muxtarov	Independent	193
District Nº 22	Asim Nazim Mollazadə	Democratic Reforms Party	4.543
District Nº 22	Sərraf Balaxan Hüseynov	New Azerbaijan Party	1.801
District Nº 22	Vüqar Qurban Məmmədov	Independent	1.496
District Nº 22	Turqut Isa Qəmbər	Independent	398
District Nº 22	Rəşad Aydin Bayramov	Azerbaijan National Independence Party	322
District Nº 22	Ilham Müslüm Ağayev	Independent	292
District Nº 22	Surə Əhməd Əhmədova	Independent	252
District Nº 22	Sadiq Mahmud Həmzəyev	Independent	246
District Nº 22	Fidan Əziz Tağiyeva	Independent	243
District Nº 22	Elçin Adil Haqverdiyev	Independent	231
District Nº 22	Həsən Malik Əliyev	Independent	103
District Nº 23	Ziyad Əliabbas Səmədzadə	Independent	3.552
District Nº 23	Elnur Fidail Rəhimov	New Azerbaijan Party	1.411
District Nº 23	Zaur Mehrab Darab-Zadə	Independent	895
District Nº 23	Xaqan Fuad Rza	Independent	355
District Nº 23	Toğrul Seyran Vəliyev	Independent	323
District Nº 23	Ata Eldar Abdullayev	Independent	277
District Nº 23	Turanə Məliksabit Quliyeva	Independent	276
District Nº 23	Eldar Ismayil Ismayilov	Independent	261
District Nº 23	Zakir Ağaəli Ismayil	Musavat	180
District Nº 23	Atanur Kərəm Cəfərli	Independent	134
District Nº 23	Taleh Novruz Şahsuvarov	Independent	106
District Nº 24	Könül Oruc Nurullayeva	Independent	8.984
District Nº 24	Elnur Elşad Mustafayev	New Azerbaijan Party	5.901
District Nº 24	Ayxan Etibar Mehdizadə	Independent	1.460
District Nº 24	Qulu Həsən Ibrahimli	Independent	935
District Nº 24	Eldar Elxan Əliyev	Independent	674
District Nº 24	Ilham Nurəddin Mirzəliyev	Independent	370
District Nº 24	Nəsiman Qara Yaqublu	Musavat	352
District Nº 24	Güləli Şahüseyn Fərziyev	Independent	301
District Nº 24	Azər Bilal Ələkbərov	Independent	268
District Nº 24	Ramil Şahsuvar Rüstəmov	Independent	227
District Nº 25	Sədaqət Suleyman Vəliyeva	New Azerbaijan Party	9.805
District Nº 25	Vüqar Tofiq Məmmədov	Azerbaijan Democrat Party	2.470
District Nº 25	Məmmədəli Talib Səfərov	Azerbaijan National Independence Party	1.709
District Nº 25	Təranə Nurəddin Bağirova	Independent	704
District Nº 25	Iradə Arif Cavadova	Independent	593
District Nº 25	Zakir Bəkir Məmmədzadə	Musavat	512
District Nº 25	Niyaz Şahin Əsgərov	Independent	507
District Nº 25	Nicat Nadir Babayev	Independent	478
District Nº 25	Ramin Rəsul Əbilov	United Azerbaijan Party	439
District Nº 26	Fazil Qəzənfər Mustafa	Great Order Party	10.212
District Nº 26	Afaq Şirzad Haciyeva	New Azerbaijan Party	6.387
District Nº 26	Fəridə Qasim Eminova	Independent	738
District Nº 26	Arzuxan Baxşəli Əli-Zadə	Azerbaijan National Independence Party	722
District Nº 26	Fuad Ağasi Əliyev	Azerbaijan Liberal Democratic Party	638
District Nº 26	Ramin Musa Paşayev	Independent	614
District Nº 26	Qalib Vaqif Əliyev	Independent	571
District Nº 26	Nüsrət Ismayil Kərimov	Independent	287
District Nº 26	Rafiq Qara Ismayil	Musavat	249
District Nº 26	Nizami Həsən Məmmədov	Independent	240
District Nº 26	Sabir Əyyar Məmmədov	Independent	215
District Nº 26	Qorxmaz Ernis Heydərov	Independent	178
District Nº 26	Rövşən Firudin Həsənov	Independent	142
District Nº 26	Odər Sahib Qəni	Azerbaijan Hope Party	138
District Nº 26	Hüseyn Fikrət Süleymanli	Independent	134
District Nº 27	Əliabbas Qalib Salahzadə	New Azerbaijan Party	12.466
District Nº 27	Telman Nüsürət Quliyev	Independent	2.584
District Nº 27	Rüxsarə Muxtar Səmədova	Independent	1.010
District Nº 27	Günel Kamal Xəlilova	Independent	893
District Nº 27	Zaur Rövşən Rövşənli	Independent	868
District Nº 27	Gülməmməd Baba Abdullazadə	Musavat	765
District Nº 27	Vüqar Çingiz Qədimov	Independent	735
District Nº 27	Emin Faiq Məsimli	Independent	708
District Nº 27	Yusif Israfil Hüseynov	Independent	646
District Nº 27	Emil Bədəl Şahzadə	Independent	557
District Nº 27	Vüqar Aydin Məhərrəmov	Independent	467
District Nº 28	Eldar Allahyar Quliyev	Independent	9.858
District Nº 28	Xatirə Qilman Cabarova	New Azerbaijan Party	4.687
District Nº 28	Saidə Əlimədət Vəliyeva	Independent	1.404
District Nº 28	Aygün Yunis Süleymanli	Independent	1.296
District Nº 28	Səməd Mustafa Vəkilov	Independent	1.103
District Nº 28	Tahir Əhəd Poladzadə	Independent	960
District Nº 28	Cəmilə Sabir Abdullayeva	Independent	314
District Nº 28	Mehriban Ibrahim Sadiqova	Azerbaijan Hope Party	211
District Nº 28	Zərifə Hüseynəli Hüseynova	Independent	193
District Nº 29	Nigar Cavid Arpadarai	Independent	4.169
District Nº 29	Bəxtiyar Ilyas Haciyev	Independent	1.070
District Nº 29	Mir Fərəc Əli Abasov	Independent	964
District Nº 29	Aytən Arif Hüseynova	New Azerbaijan Party	531
District Nº 29	Sultan Sabir Nəcəfov	Independent	333
District Nº 29	Emin Cabar Babayev	Independent	260
District Nº 29	Fərəc Raqif Kərimov	Musavat	241
District Nº 29	Ilkin Oruc Həsənov	Independent	186
District Nº 29	Elsevər Səlimxan Tanriverdiyev	Independent	176
District Nº 29	Vüqar Qeys Rüstəmov	Azerbaijan Hope Party	172
District Nº 29	Rüfət Məmmədağa Səidov	Independent	150
District Nº 29	Elmin Rafiq Rzayev	Independent	149
District Nº 29	Elçin Akif Rəhimov	Independent	140
District Nº 29	Zərifə Kamal Mahmudova	Independent	139
District Nº 29	Yaşar Balakişi Babayev	Azerbaijan People's Party	113
District Nº 29	Ülvi Məmməd Məmmədli	Civic Solidarity Party	107
District Nº 29	Ilqar Səməd Bayram-Zadə	Independent	91
District Nº 29	Yurmis Alkiviadoviç Pavlidi	Independent	86
District Nº 29	Akif Elçin Həşimov	Independent	81
District Nº 29	Sahib Allahyar Əlibalayev	Independent	75
District Nº 30	Sevinc Həbib Fətəliyeva	New Azerbaijan Party	6.577
District Nº 30	Vəfa Əmiraslan Abdullayeva	Independent	512
District Nº 30	Masil Mahir Dəmirov	Independent	453
District Nº 30	Afiq Tofiq Isrəfilov	Independent	397
District Nº 30	Mirkazim Heydər Seyidov	Independent	352
District Nº 30	Ziya Rövşən Quliyev	Independent	301
District Nº 30	Ilahə Artur Sadiqova	Azerbaijan Hope Party	300
District Nº 30	Samirə Ağa Rəsul Rəfullayeva	Independent	294
District Nº 30	Aqşin Ağakişi Gülüşov	Independent	250
District Nº 30	Misir Məhəmməd Mahmudov	Musavat	232
District Nº 30	Fərid Vaqif Eyvazov	Independent	231
District Nº 30	Mahmud Avdi Mahmudov	Independent	221
District Nº 30	Vüsalə Bayram Həsənova	Independent	186
District Nº 30	Fərid Nadir Salahli	Independent	159
District Nº 30	Rəfail Nurəddin Zeynalzadə	Independent	141
District Nº 31	Etibar Qasim Əliyev	Independent	4.925
District Nº 31	Nizaməddin Fərhad Ağcayev	New Azerbaijan Party	2.067
District Nº 31	Mehman Rafiq Hüseynov	Independent	1.947
District Nº 31	Fərəc Ibrahim Quliyev	New Azerbaijan Party	725
District Nº 31	Orxan Rüstəm Kəngərli	Independent	676
District Nº 31	Pərvin Filman Mahmudov	Independent	599
District Nº 31	Ismayil Məhəmməd Balacanov	Independent	443
District Nº 31	Hikmət Fəxrəddin Məmmədov	Independent	229
District Nº 31	Paşa Elbrus Bəkirov	Independent	189
District Nº 31	Haci Vaqif Cəlilzadə	Independent	131
District Nº 31	Abdulla Qaybəli Hüseynov	Independent	121
District Nº 31	Elçin Ilham Rəsul	Independent	49
District Nº 32	Afət Əbil Həsənova	New Azerbaijan Party	8.225
District Nº 32	Ramil Balakərim Kərimli	Independent	1.768
District Nº 32	Fikrət Novruz Cəfərli	Independent	742
District Nº 32	Anar Əlisəfa Əlisəfazadə	Independent	403
District Nº 32	Elçin Niyaz Baxişov	Independent	382
District Nº 32	Bəhiyyə Rahib Mehdiyeva	Independent	302
District Nº 32	Xəyalə Elman Mütəllimova	Independent	236
District Nº 32	Vəlican Etibar Rəcəbov	Independent	217
District Nº 32	Yuriy Leonidoviç Osadçenko	Independent	185
District Nº 32	Ilqar May Quliyev	Musavat	183
District Nº 33	Invalidated results		
District Nº 34	Mixail Yuryeviç Zabelin	New Azerbaijan Party	5.184
District Nº 34	Nicat Ərrəhman Qasimzadə	Independent	2.059
District Nº 34	Imran Tahir Ələkbərov	Independent	1.814
District Nº 34	Vəsilə Cümşüd Haciyeva	Independent	944
District Nº 34	Uğurlu Lətif Şərifov	Independent	922
District Nº 34	Yaşar Zahir Məcidov	Independent	364
District Nº 34	Qəzənfər Isamməd Baxişov	Musavat	339
District Nº 34	Məryəm Əli Əkbər Əlibəyli	Independent	335
District Nº 34	Səməd Şahin Rəhimli	Independent	334
District Nº 34	Samir Şakir Əsədli	Civic Solidarity Party	308
District Nº 34	Şahlar Əhməd Haciyev	Independent	297
District Nº 34	Vidadi Vaqif Abişov	Independent	289
District Nº 34	Ləman Mirtalib Haciyeva	Independent	288
District Nº 34	Şamo Zülfiqar Salayev	Independent	276
District Nº 34	Samirə Tahir Həsənzadə	Independent	275
District Nº 34	Əkbər Məhərrəm Hüseynzadə	Independent	265
District Nº 34	Elbrus Rəhim Dadaşov	Independent	235
District Nº 34	Səddam Saməddin Nəcəfov	United Azerbaijan Party	202
District Nº 35	Invalidated results		
District Nº 36	Qüdrət Müzəffər Həsənquliyev	Whole Azerbaijan Popular Front Party	10.471
District Nº 36	Kənan Əfqan Rzayev	New Azerbaijan Party	6.233
District Nº 36	Iya Oleqovna Şaşlova	Independent	833
District Nº 36	Sanil Ağasəf Şahbazov	Independent	782
District Nº 36	Paşa Faiq Həsənli	Independent	752
District Nº 36	Kənan Qəzənfər Məmmədov	Independent	626
District Nº 36	Əvəz Qubadxan Qurbanli	Independent	578
District Nº 36	Fuad Dursun Hümbətov	Independent	571
District Nº 36	Yaşar Hilal Ağalarov	Independent	485
District Nº 36	Bəybala Əşrəf Əliyev	Azerbaijan Hope Party	463
District Nº 36	Natiq Qiyas Məmmədov	Independent	458
District Nº 36	Fikrət Hünbət Əliyev	Independent	428
District Nº 36	Ilham Tariq Mürsəlli	Independent	390
District Nº 37	Pərvin Orxan Kərimzadə	New Azerbaijan Party	6.795
District Nº 37	Ramin Rəhman Məmmədov	Independent	2.033
District Nº 37	Rüfət Bəxtiyar Bağirov	Independent	1.489
District Nº 37	Ramil Alim Qocayev	Independent	1.085
District Nº 37	Anar Məmməd Burcəliyev	Independent	1.025
District Nº 37	Vüsalə Xəqani Muradova	Independent	1.006
District Nº 37	Rauf Müslüm Qurbanov	Azerbaijan Communist Party	957
District Nº 37	Rövşən Yəhya Bağirov	Independent	924
District Nº 37	Oqtay Qəmbər Zeynalov	Musavat	814
District Nº 38	Naqif Ələşrəf Həmzəyev	New Azerbaijan Party	6.901
District Nº 38	Eldar Zabit Aslanov	Azerbaijan National Independence Party	1.214
District Nº 38	Eldar Paşa Əliyev	Independent	1.196
District Nº 38	Arzu Sədrəddin Məlikov	National Revival Movement Party	1.085
District Nº 38	Sevil Şərif Yusifova	Independent	1.046
District Nº 38	Qənbər Əsgər Süleymanov	Independent	832
District Nº 38	Amin Fəramiz Məmmədov	Independent	830
District Nº 38	Həsən Rövşən Novruzov	Independent	776
District Nº 38	Cahangir Hüseyn Əmirov	Musavat	758
District Nº 38	Asif Qəzənfər Əliyev	Independent	741
District Nº 39	Müşfiq Cəfər Cəfərov	New Azerbaijan Party	9.016
District Nº 39	Razim Təbiyyət Dəmirov	Independent	2.646
District Nº 39	Bayram Qabil Bayramov	Independent	1.633
District Nº 39	Fərman Ilqar Fərmanli	Independent	1.632
District Nº 39	Abbas Əli Bağirov	Independent	1.625
District Nº 39	Şahəddin Qüdrət Qasimov	Musavat	1.412
District Nº 39	Novruz Hətəm Allahverdiyev	Independent	925
District Nº 39	Emil Arzu Mehdiyev	Independent	796
District Nº 40	Musa Isa Quliyev	New Azerbaijan Party	6.187
District Nº 40	Vəli Zahid Dünyamaliyev	Independent	2.299
District Nº 40	Sitarə Mehdi Zeynalova	Independent	1.779
District Nº 40	Natiq Saleh Salahov	Independent	1.129
District Nº 40	Lalə Natiq Bağirova	Independent	1.074
District Nº 40	Ramil Mürşüd Səfərov	Independent	891
District Nº 40	Mirhəsən Miri Cabbarov	Independent	871
District Nº 40	Toğrul Sayad Iskəndərli	Independent	743
District Nº 40	Nurlan Vahid Abbaszadə	Independent	663
District Nº 41	Hicran Kamran Hüseynova	New Azerbaijan Party	3.556
District Nº 41	Vasif Rafail Ismayil	Independent	1.806
District Nº 41	Elnur Hidayət Abbaszadə	Independent	1.258
District Nº 41	Sərvər Süleyman Süleymanli	Independent	1.205
District Nº 41	Könül Mübariz Aliyeva	Musavat	765
District Nº 41	Elman Telman Cəfərov	Independent	629
District Nº 41	Emin Tofiq Nəbiyev	Independent	348
District Nº 41	Əli Məmməd Iskəndərov	Independent	304
District Nº 41	Vüqar Qərib Xəlilov	Independent	268
District Nº 41	Bəhruz Akif Mehdiyev	Independent	268
District Nº 41	Murad Ilqar Rəhimli	Independent	178
District Nº 41	Dəyanət Fətulla Səlimxanli	Independent	162
District Nº 41	Kamil Şirxan Bədəlov	Independent	160
District Nº 42	Tahir Famil Mirkişili	New Azerbaijan Party	6.439
District Nº 42	Ceyran Allahyar Həsənova	Independent	1.226
District Nº 42	Xətai Şahin Aliyev	Independent	719
District Nº 42	Fuad Isa Muxtarov	Independent	579
District Nº 42	Nərmin Ramiz Şamilova	Independent	540
District Nº 42	Kərim Məmməd Həsən Kərimov	Great Order Party	524
District Nº 42	Tural Həsən Ibrahimov	Independent	522
District Nº 42	Fariz Mübariz Namazli	Independent	426
District Nº 42	Kamil Xaliq Abdullayev	Independent	417
District Nº 42	Elçin Məmməd Məmməd	Independent	415
District Nº 42	Vüqar Mərdan Şahquliyev	Independent	348
District Nº 42	Elşad Vaqif Israfilov	Musavat	320
District Nº 42	Elbrus Səlim Şirinov	Whole Azerbaijan Popular Front Party	246
District Nº 42	Orxan Mübariz Muxtarov	Independent	225
District Nº 43	Emin Məcid Haciyev	New Azerbaijan Party	9.259
District Nº 43	Ikram Israyil Israfil	Musavat	1.251
District Nº 43	Kəramət Salam Salah	Independent	1.064
District Nº 43	Əli Tariel Nağiyev	Independent	772
District Nº 43	Cavid Əlislam Aslanov	Independent	664
District Nº 43	Bəhruz Natiq Salmanov	Independent	529
District Nº 43	Mehriban Ənvər Mirzəliyeva	Independent	503
District Nº 43	Şərif Əhliman Xasiyev	Independent	411
District Nº 43	Akif Əlif Bayramov	Whole Azerbaijan Popular Front Party	402
District Nº 43	Emil Əbülfət Məmmədli	Independent	312
District Nº 43	Xaliddin Baloğlan Cahangirov	Azerbaijan Democrat Party	232
District Nº 44	Müşfiq Fazil Məmmədli	New Azerbaijan Party	6.719
District Nº 44	Əzimağa Fəxrəddin Ibrahimov	Independent	2.548
District Nº 44	Leyla Elman Bədəlova	Independent	992
District Nº 44	Zeynəb Həmid Məmmədyarova	Independent	692
District Nº 44	Günel Həsən Eyvazli	Independent	594
District Nº 44	Toğrul Mustafa Əlixanov	Independent	573
District Nº 44	Sevindik Əbil Mehdiyev	Independent	529
District Nº 44	Tərlan Əziz Haci-Zadə	Independent	392
District Nº 44	Elmir Kamil Qurbanov	Independent	345
District Nº 44	Taleh Məhəmməd Əliyev	Azerbaijan Hope Party	324
District Nº 44	Rövşən Fazil Zamanli	Independent	248
District Nº 44	Səma Akif Zeynalova	Independent	244
District Nº 44	Taleh Sakit Məmmədov	Independent	189
District Nº 44	Qeys Müzəffər Vəliyev	Independent	143
Tural Heydər Əliyev	Independent	126	
District Nº 45	Oqtay Sabir Əsədov	New Azerbaijan Party	12.523
District Nº 45	Ceyhun Musa Musayev	Independent	947
District Nº 45	Əli Mircəfər Nəbiyev	Independent	692
District Nº 45	Sevinc Allahverdi Əliyeva	Independent	670
District Nº 45	Əli Ədalət Salayev	Independent	636
District Nº 45	Emin Fərail Əliyev	Independent	616
District Nº 45	Zurab Sabir Israfilov	Independent	505
District Nº 45	Zahir Feyzi Feyzullayev	Musavat	375
District Nº 45	Cəmil Zəbhulla Dadaşov	Independent	362
District Nº 45	Nigar Mübariz Səfərli	Independent	357
District Nº 45	Rəhim Rüfət Əhmədzadə	United Azerbaijan Party	252
District Nº 45	Əşrəf Xankərəm Isgəndərov	Independent	251
District Nº 45	Elnur Həşim Kəlbizadə	Independent	185
District Nº 45	Cavid Çingiz Musazadə	Independent	129
District Nº 46	Iltizam Balayusif Yusifov	Independent	11.666
District Nº 46	Azər Əli Quliyev	New Azerbaijan Party	4.550
District Nº 46	Zabit Əlizamin Gülüş	Independent	1.995
District Nº 46	Ziya Fəxrəddin Əliyev	Independent	1.565
District Nº 46	Ömər Elşən Mirzəzadə	Independent	1.047
District Nº 46	Kamil Dədəqardaş Isayev	Azerbaijan Democrat Party	660
District Nº 46	Ilkin Ilham Nuraliyev	Independent	544
District Nº 46	Xanbəgim Əmir Bağirli	Independent	533
District Nº 46	Vasif Məhərrəm Novruzov	Independent	487
District Nº 46	Əlikram Idris Xurşidov	Musavat	282
District Nº 46	Elvin Ağasəməd Əhmədov	Independent	248
District Nº 47	Aydin Böyükkişi Mirzəzadə	New Azerbaijan Party	2.132
District Nº 47	Səbuhi Mübariz Abbasov	Independent	1.575
District Nº 47	Ceyhun Qorxmaz Səbzəliyev	Independent	744
District Nº 47	Qurbanəli Vidadi Yusibov	Independent	741
District Nº 47	Məhəmməd Sevindik Zamanov	Independent	605
District Nº 47	Ruhiyə Neymət Kərimli	Independent	507
District Nº 47	Ülvi Azad Çələbiyev	Independent	437
District Nº 47	Rüfət Alim Həsənov	Independent	251
District Nº 47	Vəfa Eldar Məhərrəmova	Independent	197
District Nº 47	Ibrahim Salam Salamov	Independent	170
District Nº 47	Fariz Firdovsi Quliyev	Independent	139
District Nº 48	Ilham Kazim Məmmədov	New Azerbaijan Party	9.884
District Nº 48	Eldəniz Cəfər Səttarov	Independent	2.443
District Nº 48	Bəhrəm Allahverdi Sultanov	Modern Musavat Party	2.265
District Nº 48	Ruhin Sevindik Qaraşov	Independent	1.709
District Nº 48	Rüfət Ibrahim Hacibəyli	United Azerbaijan Party	1.233
District Nº 48	Süleyman Nəbi Ismayilbəyli	National Unity Party	1.163
District Nº 48	Səadət Əsəd Şahmaliyeva	Independent	620
District Nº 49	Əli Məhəmməd Hüseynli	New Azerbaijan Party	11.819
District Nº 49	Nəsimi Məzahir Paşayev	Independent	2.865
District Nº 49	Azər Rauf Verdiyev	Independent	1.957
District Nº 49	Sədaqət Sari Ağayev	Independent	981
District Nº 49	Nailə Isgəndər Ismayilova	Independent	719
District Nº 49	Ariz Akif Mikayilov	Independent	572
District Nº 49	Aynurə Əmirxan Nuriyeva	Independent	551
District Nº 49	Elvin Zakir Babayev	Independent	378
District Nº 50	Şahin Kamil Seyidzadə	Independent	8.570
District Nº 50	Novruz Telman Aslanov	Independent	2.886
District Nº 50	Elman Elxan Mikayilov	New Azerbaijan Party	2.597
District Nº 50	Mehdi Imdad Mehdiyev	Independent	847
District Nº 50	Emil Rafiq Mehdiyev	Independent	733
District Nº 50	Ağaşirin Əli Məmmədov	Independent	552
District Nº 50	Əflan Həsən Ibrahimov	Independent	406
District Nº 50	Məhərrəm Əkbər Vəliyev	Independent	342
District Nº 50	Ağasalam Ağacabbar Ağazadə	Independent	272
District Nº 50	Fərman Nelman Salmanli	Independent	200
District Nº 50	Aygün Inşallah Rəhimli	Independent	196
District Nº 50	Haci Seyran Quliyev	Independent	177
District Nº 50	Güllü Rizvan Babayeva	Independent	140
District Nº 50	Fəxrəndə Abbas Fərəcova	Independent	112
District Nº 50	Qəribəli Məhəmmədəli Azadəliyev	Independent	97
District Nº 51	Azər Camal Badamov	New Azerbaijan Party	11.911
District Nº 51	Emin Natiq Əliyev	Independent	3.195
District Nº 51	Abubəkir Əlimurad Musayev	Independent	2.750
District Nº 51	Rəşad Musa Süleymanov	Independent	2.677
District Nº 51	Elena Taği Rəcəbova	Independent	1.518
District Nº 51	Hacimirzə Ağamirzə Ağamirzəyev	Independent	841
District Nº 51	Şahin Fəxrəddin Zalov	Independent	457
District Nº 51	Gülnisə Əlisultan Məhsimova	Independent	282
District Nº 51	Adil Məmmədnəbi Kərimxanov	Azerbaijan Hope Party	130
District Nº 51	Elçin Sabir Abbasov	Whole Azerbaijan Popular Front Party	126
District Nº 51	Edik Hümmət Hacixanov	Civic Solidarity Party	118
District Nº 51	Ağabala Məcvulla Rizvanov	Independent	82
District Nº 52	Vahid Qazməmməd Əhmədov	Independent	10.784
District Nº 52	Aysel Balasultan Şeydayeva	New Azerbaijan Party	3.330
District Nº 52	Rasim Cavad Cavadzadə	Independent	1.209
District Nº 52	Əlabbas Kamran Məhərrəmov	Independent	988
District Nº 52	Lalə Teymur Məmmədova	Independent	821
District Nº 52	Peyman Nurağa Almasov	Independent	808
District Nº 52	Naib Əmrulla Niftəliyev	Independent	601
District Nº 52	Cahangir Tofiq Abdullayev	Azerbaijan National Independence Party	559
District Nº 52	Aytən Bədəl Bədəlbəyli	Independent	552
District Nº 52	Zahir Qəzənfər Isayev	Independent	500
District Nº 52	Naib Əzizağa Ələkbərov	Independent	420
District Nº 52	Vəli Nemət Əlibəyov	Independent	386
District Nº 52	Rafiq Məmmədşah Həsənəliyev	Independent	350
District Nº 53	Anatoliy Xaimoviç Rafailov	Independent	7.452
District Nº 53	Hafiz Ağabəy Ramazanli	Independent	1.977
District Nº 53	Habil Laçin Bayramli	New Azerbaijan Party	1.362
District Nº 53	Cavid Nizami Qara	Independent	1.201
District Nº 53	Tərlan Böyük Ağa Şəfiyev	Independent	794
District Nº 53	Vahid Zahir Məcidov	Independent	692
District Nº 53	Məhəmməd Məcnun Əliyev	Independent	643
District Nº 53	Zeynal Pirməd Həmidov	Independent	571
District Nº 53	Kəbir Cəlil Rzayev	Azerbaijan Hope Party	497
District Nº 53	Mehriban Ağakişi Quluyeva	Independent	466
District Nº 53	Əlibaba Tahir Orucov	Independent	399
District Nº 53	Yaşar Ağa Israfilov	Musavat	378
District Nº 53	Inci Ikram Ikramli	Independent	346
District Nº 53	Məzahir Əlimurad Ilyasov	Civic Solidarity Party	135
District Nº 54	Sadiq Haqverdi Qurbanov	New Azerbaijan Party	10.691
District Nº 54	Ilkin Fikrət Xəlilov	Independent	1.038
District Nº 54	Mahirə Sahid Əsədova	Independent	1.031
District Nº 54	Elza Nuru Qasimova	Independent	1.030
District Nº 54	Südabə Əlislam Məmmədova	Independent	1.000
District Nº 54	Kamil Yusif Dadaşov	Independent	581
District Nº 54	Zəhra Əliağa Aslanova	Independent	528
District Nº 54	Tural Eyyam Tağiyev	Independent	486
District Nº 54	Orxan Əlizamin Qurbanov	Independent	459
District Nº 54	Mərdan Mehdi Mehdili	Musavat	450
District Nº 54	Ilkin Hüseyn Fərzəliyev	Independent	382
District Nº 54	Rüstəm Rafiq Hidayətzadə	Independent	300
District Nº 54	Tural Marks Mamedov	Independent	240
District Nº 54	Şaban Fəxrəddin Nəsirov	Independent	233
District Nº 54	Natiq Heydər Nəbili	Independent	225
District Nº 54	Cəmil Əhmədəli Əkbərov	Independent	184
District Nº 54	Vidadi Cahid Səfərli	Independent	175
District Nº 54	Nəcəf Səbuhi Manafov	Independent	174
District Nº 55	Eldəniz Adil Səlimov	New Azerbaijan Party	14.225
District Nº 55	Lalə Gülbaba Abbasova	Independent	3.136
District Nº 55	Hadi Cavid Cəfərov	Independent	2.063
District Nº 55	Söhrab Nəsrulla Əmrahov	Musavat	1.911
District Nº 55	Fidan Mövlüd Şixmuradova	Independent	1.278
District Nº 55	Zöhrab Seyidağa Məmmədov	Whole Azerbaijan Popular Front Party	1.021
District Nº 55	Azər Haciqulu Həsrət	Independent	933
District Nº 56	Sevil Əlirazi Mikayilova	Independent	11.123
District Nº 56	Kənan Zeynal Mərdanov	New Azerbaijan Party	4.930
District Nº 56	Zeyqam Hüseyn Hüseynov	Independent	2.809
District Nº 56	Ilham Bəkir Əliyev	Independent	1.417
District Nº 56	Vasif Imaməddin Israfilov	Independent	1.248
District Nº 56	Elvin Bəhruz Talişinski	Independent	1.007
District Nº 56	Pərvin Etibar Bədirxanov	Independent	800
District Nº 56	Şövkət Əlişah Ramazanov	Musavat	690
District Nº 56	Zaur Zeynal Zeynalov	Independent	434
District Nº 56	Elşad Zəbiyulla Mərdanov	Independent	428
District Nº 56	Seymur Oruc Həmzəyev	Independent	292
District Nº 56	Iradə Məhəmməd Rəcəbova	Independent	206
District Nº 57	Əminə Həmid Ağazadə	Independent	9.363
District Nº 57	Rəşad Fərhad Qəribov	Independent	2.130
District Nº 57	Zabit Adil Quliyev	Independent	542
District Nº 57	Vilayət Musa Abuşov	Musavat	443
District Nº 57	Təranə Namizəd Feyzullayeva	Independent	418
District Nº 57	Gülzar Isaxan Ibrahimova	Independent	389
District Nº 57	Ceyhun Gülbaba Məmmədov	Independent	318
District Nº 57	Nizami Isməli Qəribov	New Azerbaijan Party	303
District Nº 57	Kamal Ilham Səlimov	United Azerbaijan Party	288
District Nº 57	Vüqar Poladxan Aliyev	Independent	137
District Nº 58	Rafael Baba Hüseynov	Civic Solidarity Party	13.444
District Nº 58	Saleh Adil Ələskərov	New Azerbaijan Party	8.892
District Nº 58	Iradə Polad Nəsirova	Independent	1.406
District Nº 58	Vadim Vahid Paşayev	Independent	1.117
District Nº 58	Suğra Böyükağa Cabarova	Independent	787
District Nº 58	Məryam Rəhim Nəhmədova	Independent	721
District Nº 59	Jalə Fərhad Əhmədova	Independent	13.962
District Nº 59	Rəşad Əzizağa Haciyev	New Azerbaijan Party	4.289
District Nº 59	Ariz Hüseynqulu Mənsimov	National Revival Movement Party	1.485
District Nº 59	Vasif Yusif Hümmətov	Independent	1.030
District Nº 59	Faiq Mirzağa Nəzərov	Independent	1.025
District Nº 59	Gültəkin Malik Əsgərova	Azerbaijan National Independence Party	993
District Nº 59	Elgün Nurulla Səmədov	Independent	312
District Nº 59	Könül Sədafər Rəhimova	Independent	287
District Nº 60	Fəzail Rəhim Ağamali	Motherland Party	8.365
District Nº 60	Etibar Əkrəm Axundov	New Azerbaijan Party	3.332
District Nº 60	Kamil Ibadət Musavi	Independent	1.986
District Nº 60	Aytən Nizami Qurbanova	Independent	1.131
District Nº 60	Əbil Əlifağa Süleymanov	Independent	848
District Nº 60	Fikrət Əhməd Məlikov	Independent	750
District Nº 60	Xalid Bilal Ibadov	Independent	308
District Nº 60	Hikmət Becan Fərzəliyev	Independent	231
District Nº 60	Ağaverdi Yarəli Rəhimov	Independent	87
District Nº 61	Sabir Xudu Rüstəmxanli	Civic Solidarity Party	2.824
District Nº 61	Xəqani Imran Abdullayev	Independent	2.533
District Nº 61	Kamran Alim Əsədov	Independent	1.419
District Nº 61	Əfzələddin Şahverən Zakirov	Independent	1.373
District Nº 61	Sevinc Tapdiq Ağaliyeva	Independent	1.082
District Nº 61	Hüseyin Yunus Qurbanov	Independent	1.016
District Nº 61	Ramil Yunus Baba	Independent	900
District Nº 61	Zahir Siyasət Bəbirzadə	Independent	748
District Nº 61	Gültəkin Zakir Sadiqova	New Azerbaijan Party	351
District Nº 61	Samir Beydulla Nağiyev	Independent	266
District Nº 61	Bəhruz Habil Heydərov	Independent	261
District Nº 61	Ağalar Məmmədağa Əsgərov	Independent	201
District Nº 61	Pərvanə Salman Abdullayeva	Independent	163
District Nº 61	Soltanhəmid Hilal Məlikov	Independent	86
District Nº 62	Əziz Yusif Ələkbərov	New Azerbaijan Party	11.428
District Nº 62	Nahid Rza Bağirov	Independent	4.274
District Nº 62	Kamil Rzaqulu Seyidov	Azerbaijan Free Republican Party	2.637
District Nº 62	Şamxal Məhəmməd Ibayev	Independent	1.112
District Nº 62	Vüqar Səhrab Məmmədov	Independent	969
District Nº 62	Həmid Fazil Qasimov	Independent	904
District Nº 62	Fərid Asif Seyidov	Independent	742
District Nº 62	Ilhamə Tahir Quliyeva	Independent	671
District Nº 62	Rahib Əli Ismayilov	Motherland Party	604
District Nº 63	Kamal Xaqani Cəfərov	New Azerbaijan Party	11.537
District Nº 63	Qiyas Böyükağa Sadiqov	Azerbaijan People's Party	2.217
District Nº 63	Könül Bəhram Rəhimova	Independent	2.190
District Nº 63	Amal Mirbaği Ağayev	Independent	1.926
District Nº 63	Mehran Mehman Qəfərov	Independent	1.675
District Nº 63	Razi Umudəli Abasov	Independent	1.125
District Nº 63	Vüqar Vaqif Hüseynov	Independent	910
District Nº 63	Fatimə Mənsim Qafarova	Whole Azerbaijan Popular Front Party	408
District Nº 64	Ramin Ələmşah Məmmədov	New Azerbaijan Party	12.673
District Nº 64	Kamal Asif Sadiqli	Independent	2.609
District Nº 64	Sevinc Əlihüseyn Xəlilova	Independent	1.968
District Nº 64	Dilşad Meyxoş Əhədova	Independent	1.863
District Nº 64	Mirtale Mirnizami Ağazadə	Independent	1.255
District Nº 64	Yaqub Aydin Babayev	Independent	899
District Nº 64	Faiq Israfil Hüseynov	Independent	712
District Nº 64	Pünhan Hilal Əliyev	Independent	559
District Nº 65	Əhliman Tapdiq Əmiraslanov	New Azerbaijan Party	15.244
District Nº 65	Telman Məmmədtaği Bağirov	Independent	1.823
District Nº 65	Tahir Sari Ağayev	Independent	1.627
District Nº 65	Elnur Ibrahim Qasimov	Independent	1.620
District Nº 65	Rubabə Həsrət Quliyeva	Independent	1.403
District Nº 65	Xəyal Bəhrəm Əhmədov	Independent	1.229
District Nº 65	Haqverdi Hüseyn Tapdiqov	Independent	1.161
District Nº 66	Bəhruz Abdurrəhman Məhərrəmov	Independent	14.274
District Nº 66	Səyalə Əhmədağa Şahbazova	New Azerbaijan Party	6.055
District Nº 66	Yusif Haceyib Mehti	Musavat	2.314
District Nº 66	Lətifə Oruc Əliyeva	Independent	1.333
District Nº 66	Araz Azad Aslanli	Independent	1.243
District Nº 66	Nurlan Sabir Mirəli	Independent	578
District Nº 66	Heydər Dədəkişi Çobanzadə	Independent	527
District Nº 66	Əjdər Təzəxan Mehdiyev	Independent	376
District Nº 66	Şövkət Iftixar Həsənova	Independent	276
District Nº 67	Malik Əvəz Həsənov	New Azerbaijan Party	13.472
District Nº 67	Atabala Ataxan Pənahov	Independent	1.844
District Nº 67	Elşad Şakir Təhməzov	Independent	973
District Nº 67	Azər Əbülfəz Əsgərov	Musavat	782
District Nº 67	Samirə Fərhad Mailova	Independent	759
District Nº 67	Elşən Mailxan Abiyev	Independent	758
District Nº 67	Habil Rza Quliyev	Independent	620
District Nº 67	Şahin Xanoğlan Bağirov	Democratic Reforms Party	507
District Nº 67	Telman Yaşar Mirzəyev	Independent	461
District Nº 67	Anar Ərəstun Məmmədzadə	Independent	439
District Nº 68	Elman Xudam Nəsirov	New Azerbaijan Party	11.319
District Nº 68	Sakit Fərhad Mirişov	Independent	2.235
District Nº 68	Tacəddin Sücəddin Sücəddinov	Independent	1.847
District Nº 68	Əfqan Bəhlul Quliyev	Independent	1.367
District Nº 68	Elnur Zakir Şükürov	Independent	1.261
District Nº 68	Mirbağir Fəyaz Bünyatov	Independent	1.169
District Nº 68	Davud Hadibək Qurbanov	Musavat	701
District Nº 68	Fuad Füzuli Əsgərov	Independent	663
District Nº 68	Xuraman Şakir Nuriyeva	Independent	303
District Nº 68	Məhəmməd Əli Əliyev	Independent	225
District Nº 69	Fəzail Feyruz Ibrahimli	Civic Solidarity Party	9.549
District Nº 69	Etibar Sadiğ Sadiğov	New Azerbaijan Party	2.622
District Nº 69	Murad Əli Hüseynov	Independent	2.190
District Nº 69	Səid Mir Kazim Kazimov	Independent	943
District Nº 69	Elçin Rəşid Axundzadə	Independent	846
District Nº 69	Əliəsgər Vəli Vəliyev	Independent	708
District Nº 69	Azər Həzrətqulu Əsədov	Independent	663
District Nº 69	Daşqin Ağarza Nuriyev	Azerbaijan Democrat Party	661
District Nº 69	Bəsirə Sakit Kərimova	Independent	289
District Nº 69	Əlipənah Ağaşirin Rzali	Musavat	270
District Nº 70	Məşhur Şahbaz Məmmədov	New Azerbaijan Party	13.637
District Nº 70	Miraqil Miramin Seyidzadə	Independent	2.930
District Nº 70	Ülkər Söhbət Piriyeva	Independent	1.267
District Nº 70	Taleh Balağa Əkbərov	Independent	686
District Nº 70	Aytən Ədalət Əliyeva	Independent	595
District Nº 70	Alay Aydin Bəhrəmov	Independent	587
District Nº 70	Əli Qurban Cəfərov	Democratic Reforms Party	483
District Nº 70	Ilyas Novruz Əsgərov	Independent	404
District Nº 70	Şamxal Imaməddin Bağişov	Independent	272
District Nº 70	Səfa Sevdagər Əzimov	Great Azerbaijan Party	168
District Nº 71	Anar Camal Isgəndərov	New Azerbaijan Party	11.537
District Nº 71	Rüfət Azər Əliyev	Independent	1.277
District Nº 71	Dilarə Məmməd Hüseynova	Independent	972
District Nº 71	Afər Pərviz Fəttahova	Independent	903
District Nº 71	Azad Məhəddin Əhmədov	Motherland Party	865
District Nº 71	Əflatun Rauf Qurbanov	Independent	760
District Nº 71	Mirəkbər Mirbaba Şükürov	Independent	724
District Nº 71	Allahverdi Xanlar Rəhimov	Musavat	691
District Nº 71	Vasili Səfərəli Şahmuradov	Independent	351
District Nº 72	Musa Cəfər Qasimli	Independent	12.257
District Nº 72	Sərvər Məlikməmməd Əliyev	New Azerbaijan Party	5.562
District Nº 72	Xəqani Vədud Cəfərov	Independent	1.163
District Nº 72	Intizar Calair Adişova	Independent	974
District Nº 72	Əli Mahmudağa Əliyev	Independent	616
District Nº 72	Qubadəli Əli Rzayev	Independent	614
District Nº 72	Nəsrəddin Təvəkkül Qənbərov	Independent	541
District Nº 72	Xanoğlan Əlüseyn Əhmədov	Intellectuals Party	529
District Nº 72	Sahib Layic Ağayev	Independent	499
District Nº 73	Rüfət Atakişi Quliyev	Independent	9.375
District Nº 73	Güloğlan Baloğlan Bağirov	New Azerbaijan Party	2.615
District Nº 73	Murad Taleh Cəfərov	Independent	1.843
District Nº 73	Yadigar Sadiq Sadiqli	Independent	1.026
District Nº 73	Qardaşxan Nəhmət Əzizxanli	Independent	939
District Nº 73	Sevda Arif Ibrahimova	Independent	928
District Nº 73	Emin Adil Əhədov	Independent	802
District Nº 73	Baba Əlövsət Məmmədli	Independent	205
District Nº 74	Invalidated results		
District Nº 75	Cavanşir Hümmət Paşazadə	New Azerbaijan Party	13.541
District Nº 75	Yalçin Yəhya Heydərli	Musavat	2.569
District Nº 75	Kamran Əhməd Məhərrəmov	Independent	2.304
District Nº 75	Nəzakət Malik Quliyeva	Independent	1.412
District Nº 75	Rövşən Fətiağa Muxtarov	Independent	1.292
District Nº 75	Ceyhun Umud Kəlbiyev	Independent	1.028
District Nº 76	Ziyafət Abbas Əsgərov	New Azerbaijan Party	13.716
District Nº 76	Xalid Zakir Bağirov	Independent	2.804
District Nº 76	Ramin Arif Əliyev	Azerbaijan Hope Party	1.528
District Nº 76	Ceyhun Həmdəm Zəkiyev	National Revival Movement Party	814
District Nº 76	Şükür Qədəboyli Cəfərov	Independent	790
District Nº 76	Elyar Elşad Məcidli	Independent	608
District Nº 76	Şəbnəm Mürsəl Rzayeva	Independent	489
District Nº 77	Rəşad Məmmədqulu Mahmudov	New Azerbaijan Party	9.380
District Nº 77	Rövşən Tofiq Bağirov	Independent	1.452
District Nº 77	Hüseynağa Bəşirağa Axundov	Independent	787
District Nº 77	Iqbal Xeyrulla Quliyev	Independent	709
District Nº 77	Tarif Vəli Əliyev	Musavat	601
District Nº 77	Rəşad Əlövsət Həsənov	Independent	545
District Nº 77	Sevinc Səadət Rəcəbova	Independent	538
District Nº 77	Bəhruz Nurəddin Qasimov	Independent	367
District Nº 77	Müştaba Isaq Isaqov	Independent	327
District Nº 77	Zahir Həbib Məmmədov	Independent	322
District Nº 77	Çingiz Məmməd Rahmanov	Independent	307
District Nº 77	Əli Ağadədə Əliyev	Azerbaijan Hope Party	301
District Nº 77	Ilqar Əvəz Qənbərov	Azerbaijan Democrat Party	262
District Nº 77	Bəxtiyar Qadir Məmmədov	Motherland Party	201
District Nº 77	Nurməmməd Mirhüseyn Əliyev	Independent	185
District Nº 78	Iqbal Nəriman Məmmədov	New Azerbaijan Party	8.000
District Nº 78	Babək Meyxos Hüseynov	Independent	1.725
District Nº 78	Hikmət Səttar Ağayev	Independent	1.614
District Nº 78	Vasif Vaqif Qafarov	Independent	893
District Nº 78	Mehriban Əli Paşayeva	Independent	834
District Nº 78	Təyyar Kazim Yəhyayev	Independent	790
District Nº 78	Firdovsi Həşim Şahbazov	Independent	610
District Nº 78	Ramil Qələmirzə Hüseynov	Independent	375
District Nº 78	Bəxtiyar Balamirzə Fətullayev	Independent	292
District Nº 78	Tahir Əli Hüseynov	Musavat	260
District Nº 78	Şahlar Akif Məmmədov	Independent	156
District Nº 78	Xanoğlan Baloğlan Qasimov	Independent	106
District Nº 78	Fərid Tahir Şahbazli	Independent	86
District Nº 78	Elçin Sənan Feyziyev	Independent	69
District Nº 78	Xavər Balağa Hüseynova	Independent	56
District Nº 79	Razi Qulaməli Nurullayev	Independent	2.398
District Nº 79	Murad Qoçu Fərzəliyev	Independent	2.209
District Nº 79	Iltizam Nizam Əkbərli	Independent	1.060
District Nº 79	Taleh Eyvaz Tapdiqov	Independent	906
District Nº 79	Samir Teyyub Qurbanov	Independent	880
District Nº 79	Ilqar Qəşəm Hüseynli	Independent	823
District Nº 79	Amil Isgəndər Həsənov	Independent	546
District Nº 79	Mirsahib Mirvəli Tağiyev	Independent	379
District Nº 79	Ziya Davud Rzayev	Independent	329
District Nº 79	Səbuhi Dərgah Mehdiyev	Independent	298
District Nº 79	Yasəmən Müslüm Qəyyumova	Independent	278
District Nº 79	Ismayil Sədulla Yusifov	Independent	262
District Nº 79	Tapdiq Həsən Həsənov	Azerbaijan National Independence Party	209
District Nº 79	Elşən Şükür Şəmmədli	Independent	208
District Nº 79	Emin Söhbət Babaşov	Independent	171
District Nº 79	Tural Qismət Abbasov	Independent	156
District Nº 79	Nazim Abdulrəhim Əzimov	New Azerbaijan Party	83
District Nº 80	Invalidated results		
District Nº 81	Şahin Əmir Ismayilov	New Azerbaijan Party	12.471
District Nº 81	Ruhiyyə Zahid Mehdiyeva	Independent	1.598
District Nº 81	Zülfiyyə Yaqub Bayramova	Independent	1.296
District Nº 81	Anar Hümbət Süleymanov	Independent	948
District Nº 81	Atamoğlan Ataxan Məmmədov	Independent	753
District Nº 81	Anar Sədrəddin Məmmədov	Independent	732
District Nº 81	Hikmət Maxsud Abbasov	Independent	599
District Nº 81	Rövşən Rzaqulu Heydərov	Independent	524
District Nº 81	Orxan Ramiz Quliyev	Independent	373
District Nº 81	Muxtar Nəriman Ibrahimov	Independent	247
District Nº 82	Tahir Musa Rzayev	New Azerbaijan Party	15.779
District Nº 82	Fuad Mamed Cəfərli	Independent	2.303
District Nº 82	Əkrəm Əhməd Əmrahli	Independent	2.207
District Nº 82	Qasim Əhməd Ibrahimov	Independent	1.418
District Nº 82	Hüseyn Əli Talibov	Independent	1.106
District Nº 82	Fərid Murad Məmmədov	Independent	1.019
District Nº 82	Rəşid Mikayil Nəcəfli	Musavat	877
District Nº 82	Sənan Həsən Abdullayev	Independent	619
District Nº 82	Cavid Ibrahim Hacibəyli	United Azerbaijan Party	242
District Nº 83	Aqil Məhəmməd Abbasov	Independent	14.328
District Nº 83	Rəşad Akif Rəhimov	New Azerbaijan Party	3.267
District Nº 83	Rövşən Ərşad Bayramov	Independent	2.185
District Nº 83	Səminə Bəndali Nuriyeva	Independent	1.641
District Nº 83	Nəsimi Novruz Həsənov	Independent	527
District Nº 83	Anar Rafiq Isayev	Azerbaijan Hope Party	504
District Nº 83	Kamalə Qənimət Zeynalova	Independent	457
District Nº 83	Azad Imran Mirzəzadə	Independent	310
District Nº 84	Vüqar Ibad Bayramov	Independent	16.510
District Nº 84	Svetlana Gəray Məmmədova	New Azerbaijan Party	1.404
District Nº 84	Yusif Şükür Ağayev	Independent	1.019
District Nº 84	Xaləddin Rəşid Hüseynov	Independent	815
District Nº 84	Osman Əlişirin Kazimov	Musavat	673
District Nº 84	Mübariz Oruc Sadiqli	Independent	621
District Nº 84	Ilqar Firavan Kazimov	Independent	538
District Nº 84	Zahir Şamxal Həsənov	Independent	435
District Nº 84	Mətanət Maşallah Abbasova	Independent	388
District Nº 84	Məhəmməd Məmi Həsənov	Independent	320
District Nº 84	Cavanşir Abbas Quliyev	Independent	284
District Nº 84	Bayram Nazim Haciyev	Independent	258
District Nº 85	Tamam Şaməmməd Cəfərova	Independent	11.284
District Nº 85	Arif Hacimurad Lazimov	New Azerbaijan Party	3.567
District Nº 85	Natiq Fərhad Əsgərov	Independent	2.291
District Nº 85	Rizvan Böyükəmi Qənbərov	Independent	2.045
District Nº 85	Məzahir Zahid Məmmədov	Musavat	1.130
District Nº 85	Saman Qulaməli Həsənzadə	Independent	1.066
District Nº 85	Günel Fəramin Zairova	Independent	729
District Nº 85	Əzizağa Mirpaşa Süleymanov	Independent	679
District Nº 85	Hikmət Qismət Fezullayev	Independent	274
District Nº 86	Novruzəli Davud Aslanov	Independent	10.310
District Nº 86	Zaur Fazil Muradov	New Azerbaijan Party	2.461
District Nº 86	Elçin Fazil Məmmədov	Independent	1.732
District Nº 86	Fuad Valod Bəşirov	Independent	1.268
District Nº 86	Natiq Seyfəl Məhərrəmov	Independent	1.031
District Nº 86	Vüsal Sədyar Abdullazadə	Independent	674
District Nº 86	Famil Nəsrulla Ağayev	Independent	414
District Nº 86	Zaur Zahid Qardaşov	Independent	414
District Nº 86	Yusif Məhəmməd Osmanli	Independent	363
District Nº 86	Dünyaxanim Cahan Carullayeva	Musavat	270
District Nº 86	Nigar Razi Musayeva	Independent	168
District Nº 86	Leyla Ilqar Şəfaqətova	Independent	103
District Nº 87	Tahir Zayidağa Kərimli	Unity Party	11.347
District Nº 87	Əli Abbas Hüseynov	New Azerbaijan Party	2.528
District Nº 87	Ayaz Ilyas Qocamanov	Independent	2.400
District Nº 87	Aytən Sədaqət Piriyeva	Independent	1.529
District Nº 87	Elşən Alik Əliyev	Independent	1.101
District Nº 87	Şəhla Şakir Eyvazova	Independent	608
District Nº 87	Malik Qafar Əsədov	Independent	446
District Nº 87	Rafiq Ziyadxan Babayev	Independent	329
District Nº 87	Vüsal Elxan Imanov	Independent	318
District Nº 87	Cəmil Mütəllim Əliyev	Independent	205
District Nº 87	Xatirə Əziz Rəhimli	Independent	158
District Nº 87	Vüqar Vaqif Hüseynov	Independent	150
District Nº 87	Zabit Mübariz Bədəlov	Musavat	143
District Nº 87	Ağasən Babacan Hüseynov	Independent	137
District Nº 87	Ülvi Ağaşərif Şərifzadə	Independent	134
District Nº 87	Hicran Naği Əliməmmədova	Independent	116
District Nº 88	Sabir Kamal Haciyev	Civic Unity Party	11.983
District Nº 88	Ləman Amil Haciyeva	New Azerbaijan Party	5.221
District Nº 88	Samirə Vəli Mustafayeva	Independent	1.304
District Nº 88	Qadir Adil Məmmədov	Independent	1.010
District Nº 88	Rəvan Aydin Əhmədov	United Azerbaijan Party	950
District Nº 88	Şahnəzər Ilyas Bəşirov	Independent	788
District Nº 88	Famil Nazim Sadiqov	Independent	545
District Nº 88	Qalib Sadiq Məmmədov	Independent	439
District Nº 88	Teyyub Həşim Hüseynli	Azerbaijan National Independence Party	357
District Nº 88	Həcərxanim Əmirəslan Məmmədova	Independent	130
District Nº 89	Məzahir Cavid Əfəndiyev	Independent	13.685
District Nº 89	Rəşad Əlibala Şükürov	New Azerbaijan Party	2.965
District Nº 89	Fariz Qürbət Cəmili	Independent	1.028
District Nº 89	Cabbar Manaf Məmmədov	Independent	815
District Nº 89	Ilahə Yasin Aslanova	Independent	568
District Nº 89	Ilqar Həmid Məhərrəmli	Azerbaijan Hope Party	561
District Nº 89	Natiq Nazim Əskərov	Independent	527
District Nº 89	Araz Arif Əhmədov	Independent	425
District Nº 89	Turan Ismayil Xələfov	Independent	233
District Nº 89	Çingiz Soltan Əli	Musavat	227
District Nº 89	Yusif Bəhram Rəsulov	Independent	224
District Nº 89	Vüsal Balacan Quliyev	United Azerbaijan Party	145
District Nº 90	Cavid Həmid Osmanov	New Azerbaijan Party	13.869
District Nº 90	Elxan Namiq Nazimzadə	Independent	3.664
District Nº 90	Səidə Dursun Cəbrayilova	Independent	793
District Nº 90	Vüsalə Fərman Isayeva	Independent	393
District Nº 90	Azər Hamlet Qocayev	Independent	388
District Nº 90	Əli Bəkir Haqverdiyev	Independent	376
District Nº 90	Etibar Ilham Musayev	Independent	267
District Nº 90	Anar Zamin Ibrahimli	Independent	231
District Nº 90	Mirpaşa Miri Rəhimov	Independent	124
District Nº 91	Ramil Sahib Həsən	New Azerbaijan Party	8.378
District Nº 91	Əbil Abbas Məmmədov	Independent	2.019
District Nº 91	Kənan Yaqub Cəlilov	Independent	1.498
District Nº 91	Kazim Eldar Məmmədov	Independent	1.191
District Nº 91	Şərafət Hüseyn Hüseynli	Independent	1.006
District Nº 91	Aynur Tofiq Məmmədova	Independent	669
District Nº 91	Faxriyə Elman Hüseynova	Independent	476
District Nº 91	Hüseyn Əlisahib Bəxtiyarli	Independent	370
District Nº 91	Ildirim Ivan Rüstəmov	Independent	257
District Nº 91	Teymur Alim Məmmədov	Musavat	171
District Nº 92	Jalə Fazil Əliyeva	Independent	11.609
District Nº 92	Urfan Nizaməddin Əhmədov	New Azerbaijan Party	4.063
District Nº 92	Adəm Məhərrəm Məmmədov	Independent	3.524
District Nº 92	Jalə Mütəllim Seyidli	Motherland Party	1.340
District Nº 92	Seymur Azər Bayramov	Independent	731
District Nº 92	Günel Mahmud Ibadova	Azerbaijan Hope Party	324
District Nº 92	Dərya Hidayət Əhmədova	Independent	272
District Nº 92	Mayisə Mübariz Xəlilova	Independent	242
District Nº 92	Yaqub Aydin Səfərəliyev	Independent	134
District Nº 92	Yusif Nəbi Sultanov	Independent	126
District Nº 93	Fatma Vidadi Yildirim	New Azerbaijan Party	10.309
District Nº 93	Xəyalə Yusif Əhmədova	Independent	3.302
District Nº 93	Ərəstun Əli Baxşəliyev	Independent	1.114
District Nº 93	Garay Xəlil Əsədov	Independent	501
District Nº 93	Xuraman Hilal Həsənova	Independent	238
District Nº 93	Zərinə Məlik Fətəliyeva	Independent	222
District Nº 94	Zahid Məhərrəm Oruc	Independent	14.330
District Nº 94	Qnyaz Vəli Məmmədov	New Azerbaijan Party	1.159
District Nº 94	Qulu Qurban Quliyev	Independent	1.048
District Nº 94	Adil Vaqif Vəliyev	Independent	1.017
District Nº 94	Dadaş Rəşid Əhmədli	Musavat	948
District Nº 94	Mətanət Əsgər Cəfərova	Independent	760
District Nº 94	Zöhrab Camal Əliyev	Independent	712
District Nº 94	Maqsud Faiq Əliyev	Independent	665
District Nº 95	Sahib Eyvaz Aliyev	Independent	8.684
District Nº 95	Eldar Garay Əsədov	New Azerbaijan Party	4.757
District Nº 95	Pənah Ağamali Məmmmədov	Independent	2.509
District Nº 95	Arzu Yusif Mehtiyeva	Independent	1.119
District Nº 95	Ruxi Malik Hüseynov	Independent	872
District Nº 95	Tamilla Famil Qulami	Azerbaijan Hope Party	769
District Nº 95	Ziya Mehrac Mahmudov	Independent	711
District Nº 95	Ayaz Rəsul Abdullayev	Independent	645
District Nº 95	Vüqar Sabir Əliyev	Independent	470
District Nº 95	Şəhriyar Elxan Məmmədov	Independent	407
District Nº 95	Könül Fəhrad Quliyeva	Independent	362
District Nº 95	Hicran Əbdüləli Orucova	Independent	250
District Nº 96	Anar Ilyaz Məmmədov	New Azerbaijan Party	13.146
District Nº 96	Səidə Məmməd Məmmədova	Independent	2.179
District Nº 96	Nəsirullah Şəmil Əhmədov	Independent	1.139
District Nº 96	Əli Səvindik Həzquluyev	Whole Azerbaijan Popular Front Party	1.001
District Nº 96	Emin Suliddin Rüstəmov	Independent	978
District Nº 96	Rufik Afis Ismayilov	Independent	793
District Nº 96	Yusif Namazoğlu	Musavat	778
District Nº 96	Ilham Tahir Əhmədov	National Revival Movement Party	771
District Nº 96	Imamverdi Səməd Verdiyev	Azerbaijan Hope Party	754
District Nº 96	Ilkin Akif Ibrahimov	Independent	733
District Nº 97	Ağalar Isrəfil Vəliyev	New Azerbaijan Party	15.465
District Nº 97	Araz Saday Şamilov	Independent	1.496
District Nº 97	Sahilə Allahverən Əliyeva	Independent	1.242
District Nº 97	Rüstəm Zülfüqar Nağiyev	Independent	1.177
District Nº 97	Iradə Həmzə Həsənova	Independent	885
District Nº 97	Ülvi Sarif Hüseynov	Whole Azerbaijan Popular Front Party	815
District Nº 97	Səmadil Bəhərçi Gülməmmədova	Independent	552
District Nº 97	Aydin Murad Nəcəfov	Modern Musavat Party	551
District Nº 97	Malik Əli Həsənov	Musavat	535
District Nº 98	Sahibə Əli Qafarova	New Azerbaijan Party	9.642
District Nº 98	Elfaq Məzahir Səfərov	Independent	3.981
District Nº 98	Elşad Sadiq Nağiyev	Independent	2.792
District Nº 98	Eyvaz Ələddin Əhmədov	Independent	660
District Nº 98	Müşfiq Niftali Şəmmədov	Independent	395
District Nº 98	Elmir Məzahir Hüseynov	Independent	345
District Nº 98	Validə Vaqif Qədirova	Independent	248
District Nº 98	Emil Sakit Əliyev	Independent	233
District Nº 98	Elbəy Əli Rüstəmov	Independent	212
District Nº 99	Nurlan Urfan Həsənov	New Azerbaijan Party	13.688
District Nº 99	Vəsilə Çapay Abulova	Independent	1.619
District Nº 99	Tural Allahverdi Zeynalov	Independent	1.409
District Nº 99	Zabit Yunus Aslanov	Independent	1.331
District Nº 99	Rəna Hümbət Məmmədova	Independent	1.089
District Nº 99	Nahid Namaz Məmmədov	Independent	894
District Nº 99	Ceyhun Eldar Qurbanov	Independent	645
District Nº 99	Ərtoğrul Ələkbər Hüseynli	Independent	631
District Nº 99	Ədalət Əli Əliyev	Independent	615
District Nº 99	Elvira Çingiz Quliyeva	Independent	397
District Nº 100	Kamran Fərhad Bayramov	New Azerbaijan Party	13.906
District Nº 100	Anar Nizami Əmikişiyev	Independent	1.602
District Nº 100	Əlizamin Həbib Əhmədzadə	Independent	1.364
District Nº 100	Fərid Təriqət Əbdürrəhimov	Independent	1.191
District Nº 100	Samirə Ilham Eynalova	Independent	984
District Nº 100	Nüsrət Qüdrət Əmirov	Independent	712
District Nº 100	Elmir Ilqar Abbasov	Independent	574
District Nº 100	Elməddin Qiyas Qüdrətli	Independent	549
District Nº 101	Elşad Mirbəşir	New Azerbaijan Party	12.633
District Nº 101	Habil Yaqub Məmmədov	Independent	2.003
District Nº 101	Möhsüm Qədir Aslanov	Independent	1.947
District Nº 101	Hafiz Ələmdar Haciyev	Modern Musavat Party	902
District Nº 101	Orxan Səfər Əhmədov	Independent	746
District Nº 101	Xəyal Vahid Ismayilov	Independent	643
District Nº 101	Mirumud Mirtam Seyidov	Independent	583
District Nº 101	Azər Bilman Xudiyev	Independent	341
District Nº 101	Teymur Yaqub Məmmədaliyev	Independent	325
District Nº 101	Şamil Bayram Həsənov	Independent	315
District Nº 101	Qədim Şöhrəddin Vəliyev	Independent	273
District Nº 102	Nizami Abdulla Səfərov	New Azerbaijan Party	15.854
District Nº 102	Tural Mətləb Turan	Independent	2.032
District Nº 102	Rəsul Etibar Əkbərli	Independent	1.934
District Nº 102	Asif Vaqif Namazov	Independent	1.612
District Nº 102	Aygün Şəmil Əliyeva	Independent	1.302
District Nº 102	Raul Isa Ismayilov	Independent	1.020
District Nº 102	Ramil Natiq Zeynalov	Whole Azerbaijan Popular Front Party	1.018
District Nº 103	Sevinc Əmirəhməd Hüseynova	New Azerbaijan Party	14.201
District Nº 103	Elmar Yusif Musayev	Independent	4.390
District Nº 103	Sahib Camal Məmməd	Independent	1.434
District Nº 103	Ayşən Firdovsi Əliyeva	Independent	1.353
District Nº 103	Lalə Əlizeynal Zeynalova	Independent	1.039
District Nº 103	Raymonda Zaur Xidir-Zadə	Independent	699
District Nº 104	Arzu Nəsib Nağiyev	Independent	14.176
District Nº 104	Elnarə Səməndər Məhərrəmova	New Azerbaijan Party	5.029
District Nº 104	Nazim Hüseyn Bəydəmirli	Independent	1.092
District Nº 104	Rauf Fərhad Vəliyev	Independent	1.005
District Nº 104	Rahib Müseyib Ibrahimov	Independent	999
District Nº 104	Afiq Aydin Axundov	Independent	767
District Nº 104	Elçin Ibad Qurbanov	Independent	717
District Nº 104	Güldəstə Akif Məmmədova	Motherland Party	618
District Nº 104	Sənan Iman Rəhimzadə	Independent	362
District Nº 104	Iradə Mikayil Orucova	Independent	233
District Nº 104	Sənubər Qəzənfər Vəliyeva	Independent	206
District Nº 105	Qənirə Ələsgər Paşayeva	Independent	15.848
District Nº 105	Raul Mirsalam Məmmədov	Independent	2.692
District Nº 105	Məhəbbət Müsəllim Hüseynova	New Azerbaijan Party	2.036
District Nº 105	Imamqulu Şəmistan Nağiyev	Democratic Azerbaijani World Party	795
District Nº 105	Üzeyir Biləndər Isgəndərli	Independent	522
District Nº 105	Elmira Fizuli Bağirova	Independent	263
District Nº 105	Ilyas Məhərrəm Xaliqverdiyev	Independent	234
District Nº 106	Ülviyyə Cavanşir Ağayeva	Independent	10.894
District Nº 106	Niyazi Yusif Tağiyev	New Azerbaijan Party	1.851
District Nº 106	Nurlana Vilayət Əliyeva	Independent	1.718
District Nº 106	Turqay Imamqulu Hüseynov	Independent	1.274
District Nº 106	Vüsalə Valeh Dadaşova	Independent	1.256
District Nº 106	Elvin Zakir Ismayilov	Independent	876
District Nº 106	Mütəllim Qara Rəhimov	Justice Party	766
District Nº 106	Şəhla Əli Ismayilova	Independent	484
District Nº 106	Mehriban Məmməd Məmmədova	Independent	467
District Nº 106	Cavid Rəbani Musayev	Independent	334
District Nº 106	Günay Elxan Seyidova	Independent	187
District Nº 107	Səməd Ismayil Seyidov	New Azerbaijan Party	16.242
District Nº 107	Ramil Vahid Göyüşov	Independent	1.380
District Nº 107	Hicran Vidadi Əyyubova	Independent	696
District Nº 107	Sevinc Ibrahim Kərimova	Independent	659
District Nº 107	Dilqəm Sayad Məmmədov	Independent	611
District Nº 107	Mustafa Şövkət Mirzəyev	Independent	604
District Nº 107	Günel Şahin Ismayilzadə	Independent	573
District Nº 107	Ramiz Yolçu Qasimov	Independent	527
District Nº 108	Nizami Qulu Cəfərov	New Azerbaijan Party	10.315
District Nº 108	Rəna Əbülfəz Qəfərova	Independent	2.070
District Nº 108	Elşən Zöhrab Orucov	Independent	1.981
District Nº 108	Cəfər Telman Paşayev	Independent	1.296
District Nº 108	Elvin Mustafa Qarabəyli	Independent	1.062
District Nº 108	Başxanim Şamil Abbasova	Musavat	664
District Nº 108	Pərviz Arif Məsməliyev	Independent	605
District Nº 108	Ramil Faiq Paşşanov	Independent	539
District Nº 108	Rəna Mirbaba Mansirova	Independent	412
District Nº 108	Vüqar Şahverdi Mustafayev	Independent	284
District Nº 109	Nəsib Məhəmməd Məhəməliyev	New Azerbaijan Party	15.917
District Nº 109	Elmir Xəlifə Mirəliyev	Independent	3.068
District Nº 109	Ibrahim Ismayiloviç Həsənov	Modern Musavat Party	2.208
District Nº 109	Sultan Bəxtiyar Mahmudsoy-Dinçer	Independent	1.038
District Nº 109	Vüqar Seyfulla Məmmədov	Independent	743
District Nº 109	Ramil Loğman Bayramov	National Revival Movement Party	648
District Nº 109	Mustafa Dibir Dibirov	Independent	429
District Nº 109	Kamilə Aydin Mehdiyeva	Independent	311
District Nº 110	Elşən Məmmədhənifə Musayev	Azerbaijan Democratic Enlightenment Party	9.004
District Nº 110	Fariz Ramazan Həsənli	Independent	7.666
District Nº 110	Nurlana Məhəmməd Cəlil	Independent	615
District Nº 110	Telman Qurban Həsrətov	Independent	541
District Nº 110	Bəhruz Qurban Bayramov	New Azerbaijan Party	319
District Nº 110	Təranə Tariyel Xeyrullayeva	Independent	111
District Nº 110	Leyla Həbibullah Yusubova	Independent	66
District Nº 110	Müşviq Əmrullah Ramazanov	Independent	50
District Nº 111	Kamilə Əli Ağa Əliyeva	New Azerbaijan Party	7.982
District Nº 111	Rəhman Çingiz Rəsulzadə	Independent	3.997
District Nº 111	Çingiz Nəcməddin Nəbiyev	Independent	1.490
District Nº 111	Sərxan Ismayil Abdilov	Independent	441
District Nº 111	Iradə Zumrad Zərqanayeva	Independent	285
District Nº 111	Rüsxarə Sabir Əhmədova	Independent	247
District Nº 111	Ülkər Fazil Vəliyeva	Independent	231
District Nº 111	Ilkin Abdurahman Soltanov	Independent	133
District Nº 112	Azər Şəmşid Kərimli	Independent	9.857
District Nº 112	Əhməd Şair Şahidov	Independent	4.152
District Nº 112	Mahir Qalib Əfəndi	New Azerbaijan Party	1.365
District Nº 112	Abiddin Abdulla Həşimov	Independent	809
District Nº 112	Şamil Camil Qarəhmədov	Independent	805
District Nº 112	Limunət Şəfi Əmrahli	Musavat	587
District Nº 112	Nəriman Məhərrəm Dəmirçiyev	Independent	459
District Nº 112	Arzu Lətif Əhmədova	Independent	442
District Nº 112	Dilşad Zəkəriyyə Poladova	Independent	208
District Nº 113	Vüqar Yapon Iskəndərov	New Azerbaijan Party	10.076
District Nº 113	Etibar Kamal Lətifov	Independent	2.134
District Nº 113	Razim Rza Rzayev	Independent	1.777
District Nº 113	Həbibulla Şirin Manafli	Musavat	1.288
District Nº 113	Tünzalə Adişirin Məmmədzadə	Independent	1.125
District Nº 113	Zamir Zabit Salahov	Independent	1.105
District Nº 113	Rüfət Islam Bəkirov	Independent	989
District Nº 113	Samir Cabir Məmmədov	Independent	541
District Nº 114	Əli Əhməd Məsimli	Independent	9.418
District Nº 114	Ibrahimxəlil Nəriman Balayev	Independent	2.808
District Nº 114	Südabər Şöyüb Ismayilova	New Azerbaijan Party	1.116
District Nº 114	Osman Abdukərim Məmmədov	Independent	822
District Nº 114	Məmməd Qurban Islamov	Independent	577
District Nº 114	Şirin Seyfullah Hümmətov	Independent	562
District Nº 114	Samir Şahid Ismayilov	Independent	526
District Nº 114	Ülvi Ələfsər Məmmədov	Independent	249
District Nº 114	Mete Seymur Türksoy	Independent	231
District Nº 114	Şərqiyyə Əbülfət Seyidova	Independent	154
District Nº 115	Cavanşir Əyyub Feyziyev	Independent	12.674
District Nº 115	Rahim Rafiq Həsənov	New Azerbaijan Party	2.635
District Nº 115	Sahib Fərman Kərimli	Independent	936
District Nº 115	Bakixan Həsrət Qəribli	Musavat	642
District Nº 115	Nəzakət Rasim Qəhrəmanzadə	Independent	484
District Nº 115	Elşad Bahadur Sadiqov	Independent	479
District Nº 115	Sahib Tərlan Məhyəddinov	Independent	458
District Nº 115	Əli Şərif Səfərov	Independent	436
District Nº 116	Fəttah Səməd Heydərov	Independent	18.697
District Nº 116	Samir Ramiq Əliyev	New Azerbaijan Party	3.743
District Nº 116	Göyüş Mehman Hacizadə	Independent	721
District Nº 116	Mehdi Xeyirbəy Quliyev	Independent	555
District Nº 116	Ilham Səmid Əhmədov	Independent	527
District Nº 116	Zahir Rəsul Qəniyev	Independent	512
District Nº 117	Aqiyə Həbib Naxçivanli	New Azerbaijan Party	15.639
District Nº 117	Ləman Aləşrəf Ismayilova	Independent	3.515
District Nº 117	Ceyhun Əhmədiyə Şahhüseynov	Independent	1.067
District Nº 117	Elsevər Firqət Seyid	Independent	807
District Nº 117	Kamran Möhlət Seyidov	Independent	749
District Nº 117	Mətin Vüqar Əsədzadə	Independent	665
District Nº 117	Iradə Nemət Məmmədova	Independent	617
District Nº 117	Atamoğlan Fərrux Məmmədov	Great Order Party	615
District Nº 118	Bəxtiyar Həmzə Əliyev	Independent	12.870
District Nº 118	Farid Mustafa Muradov	New Azerbaijan Party	3.271
District Nº 118	Zərif Qabil Mehtiyeva	Independent	1.385
District Nº 118	Musa Habil Ağayev	Independent	1.346
District Nº 118	Vüsal Məhəmməd Rzazadə	Azerbaijan Hope Party	491
District Nº 118	Həlimə Səfər Əliyeva	Independent	446
District Nº 118	Xəqani Nazim Ələsgərov	Independent	434
District Nº 118	Gülbəniz Nəsib Əhmədova	Independent	223
District Nº 119	Bəxtiyar Yusif Sadiqov	New Azerbaijan Party	14.641
District Nº 119	Tural Fikrət Cavadov	Independent	2.483
District Nº 119	Qüdrət Nüsrət Nuriyev	Independent	1.649
District Nº 119	Elşad Ərşad Əliyev	Independent	1.480
District Nº 119	Mehman Mirsiyab Məmmədov	Independent	1.122
District Nº 119	Aygün Ramiz Məhərova	Independent	912
District Nº 119	Elşən Rəşid Hüseynov	Independent	862
District Nº 119	Ülvi Məhəbbət Qədirov	Independent	787
District Nº 120	Ceyhun Valeh Məmmədov	New Azerbaijan Party	12.062
District Nº 120	Şaiq Sədi Piriyev	Independent	4.510
District Nº 120	Əhliman Yaşasif Abbasov	Independent	742
District Nº 120	Coşqun Arif Mehdiyev	Independent	535
District Nº 120	Qafqaz Səfər Maqsudov	Independent	467
District Nº 120	Mahmud Uğurlu Ismayilov	Independent	448
District Nº 120	Sərvər Abasqulu Mehdiyev	Independent	389
District Nº 120	Pənah Əhməd Ismayilov	Motherland Party	328
District Nº 120	Zaur Əhməd Məmmədov	Independent	318
District Nº 120	Natəvan Məhərrəm Ağayeva	Independent	294
District Nº 120	Sari Atlixan Məmmədov	Independent	264
District Nº 120	Nail Əli Əhmədov	Independent	170
District Nº 120	Yaqub Ibə Həmzəyev	Independent	169
District Nº 120	Taryel Fazil Vəliyev	Independent	146
District Nº 120	Elşən Hökumət Nəcəfov	Independent	133
District Nº 121	Mahir Tapdiq Abbaszadə	New Azerbaijan Party	16.515
District Nº 121	Nəzakət Oruc Quliyeva	Independent	2.493
District Nº 121	Elnur Malik Abdullayev	Independent	2.010
District Nº 121	Gülolan Hüseynqulu Isgəndərli	Independent	1.689
District Nº 121	Raqif Vaqif Məmmədov	Independent	1.587
District Nº 121	Elçin Ismayil Ibadov	Independent	1.374
District Nº 121	Namiq Cabbar Nəqiyev	Independent	1.340
District Nº 121	Sahib Məhəmməd Hətəmov	Independent	1.178
District Nº 121	Raqif Məhi Kərimli	Musavat	1.069
District Nº 122	Tural Babaşah Gəncəliyev	Independent	1.596
District Nº 122	Elbrus Əlfasiya Həşimov	Independent	303
District Nº 122	Şamxal Cəlil Adigözəlov	Independent	227
District Nº 122	Səbuhi Gündüz Səmədov	Independent	226
District Nº 122	Aydin Asif Əliyev	Independent	127
District Nº 122	Jalə Elxan Məmmədova	Independent	121
District Nº 122	Elxan Əliyar Xanəlizadə	Independent	77
District Nº 122	Elman Rəhman Həsənli	Independent	72
District Nº 122	Şəfəq Adil Quliyeva	Civic Solidarity Party	65
District Nº 123	Aqil Sadiq Məmmədov	New Azerbaijan Party	16.462
District Nº 123	Əziz Həbib Qənbərov	Independent	4.113
District Nº 123	Səxavət Ellaz Süleymanov	Independent	1.150
District Nº 123	Vüqar Eyvaz Ələkbərov	Independent	357
District Nº 123	Xaqani Şirin Mamedov	Independent	270
District Nº 123	Vaqif Əliabbas Əşrəfov	Independent	247
District Nº 123	Sirac Vəli Hüseynov	Independent	234
District Nº 123	Kəmalə Məmməd Imaməliyeva	Independent	170
District Nº 124	Elman Camal Məmmədov	New Azerbaijan Party	13.473
District Nº 124	Elxan Bəhmən Süleymanli	Independent	1.817
District Nº 124	Elçin Qadir Əliyev	Independent	1.381
District Nº 124	Aynur Vaqif Zülfüqarova	Independent	1.022
District Nº 124	Rasim Məzahir Bayramov	Independent	919
District Nº 124	Etibar Məmməd Abdullayev	Independent	832
District Nº 124	Mübariz Yaqub Əliyev	Independent	508
District Nº 124	Təbriz Ibrahim Quliyev	Civic Solidarity Party	443
District Nº 124	Sərraf Vəliş Orucov	Independent	433
District Nº 124	Elçin Abdulla Abdullayev	Independent	353
District Nº 124	Kəmalə Rəfail Quliyeva	Independent	298
District Nº 124	Fidan Hacibala Həmid-Zadə	Independent	298
District Nº 124	Tural Nadir Novruzlu	Motherland Party	266
District Nº 124	Pərviz Abid Usubov	Independent	173
District Nº 125	Imamverdi Ibiş Ismayilov	New Azerbaijan Party	4.943
District Nº 125	Faiq Alməmməd Kərimov	Independent	1.793
District Nº 125	Anar Əsəd Əsədli	Independent	1.590
District Nº 125	Qara Məhərrəm Məmmədov	Independent	1.001
District Nº 125	Aynur Əli Abdullayeva	Independent	569
District Nº 125	Emin Rasif Həsənov	Independent	528
District Nº 125	Əlisahib Vəli Hüseynov	Democratic Azerbaijani World Party	407
District Nº 125	Xəqan Ilham Hümmətzadə	Independent	359
District Nº 125	Afət Telman Məhərrəmova	Independent	304
District Nº 125	Emin Fazil Əliyev	Independent	287
District Nº 125	Baxşəli Əli Əliyev	Independent	229
District Nº 125	Nazim Azad Azadoğlu	Musavat	163
District Nº 125	Samir Fəxrəddin Ibadov	Independent	98
District Nº 125	Elvin Filman Mahmudov	Independent	94

== Aftermath ==
The newly elected National Assembly met for the first time on 10 March and elected Sahiba Gafarova as Speaker, becoming the first woman to hold this position in Azerbaijan.
