= 2015 Azerbaijani parliamentary election =

- 1 November 2015
- All 125 seats in the National Assembly; 63 seats needed for a majority
Party	Leader	Vote %	Seats	+/–
New Azerbaijan	Ilham Aliyev	47.20	69	−2
BAXCP	Gudrat Gasanguliev	1.49	1	0
Civic Solidarity	Sabir Rustamkhanli	1.32	2	−1
Great Order	Fazil Mustafa	1.20	1	0
Motherland	Fazail Agamali	1.00	1	−1
Social Prosperity	Xanhüseyn Kazımlı	0.77	1	0
DİP	Asim Mollazadə	0.74	1	0
Unity	Tahir Kərimli	0.53	1	+1
Civic Unity	Sabir Hacıyev	0.48	1	0
ADMP	Elşən Musayev	0.47	1	+1
National Revival	Faraj Guliyev	0.42	1	New
Social Democratic	Araz Alizadeh	0.40	1	+1
Independents	–	40.50	43	+4
This lists parties that won seats. See the complete results below.
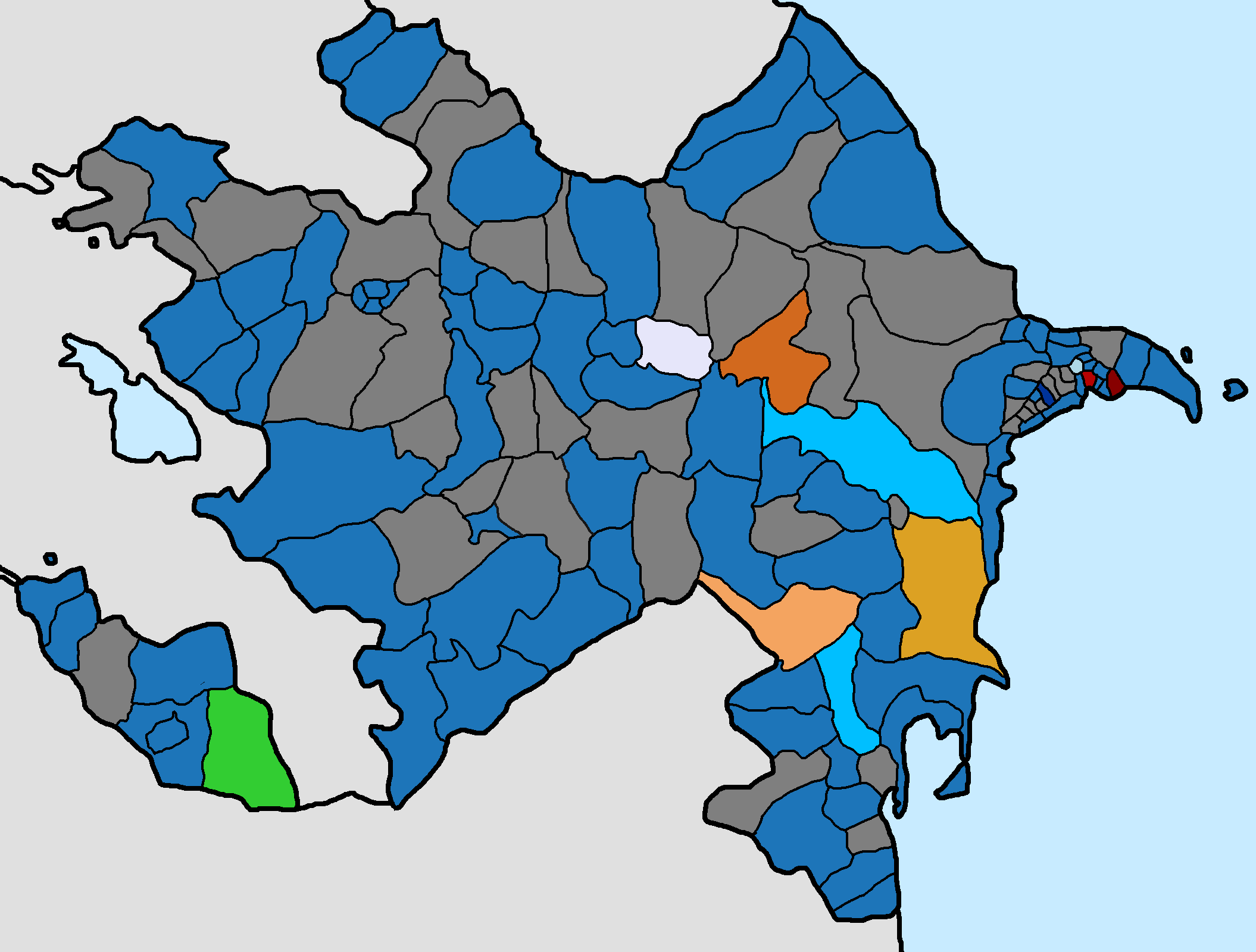
Results by constituency
Speaker before	Speaker after
Ogtay Asadov	Ogtay Asadov

Parliamentary elections were held in Azerbaijan on 1 November 2015. The result was a victory for the ruling New Azerbaijan Party, which won 69 of the 125 seats in the National Assembly amidst an opposition boycott.

== Electoral system ==
The 125 members of the National Assembly were elected in single-member constituencies using the first-past-the-post system.

== Campaign ==
The elections were boycotted by the main opposition parties, including Musavat, which accused the government of "massive violations".

== Results ==
The results in constituency 90 (Agdash) were annulled due to irregularities after an appeal by two candidates; independent candidate Chingiz Asadullayev had been in the lead.

Party	Votes	%	Seats	+/–
New Azerbaijan Party	1,340,765	47.20	69	−2
Whole Azerbaijan Popular Front Party	42,459	1.49	1	0
Civic Solidarity Party	37,561	1.32	2	−1
Great Order Party	34,156	1.20	1	0
Motherland Party	28,483	1.00	1	−1
Musavat	24,995	0.88	0	0
Azerbaijan Social Prosperity Party	22,003	0.77	1	0
Democratic Reforms Party	21,044	0.74	1	0
Unity Party	15,070	0.53	1	+1
Party of Hope	14,815	0.52	0	−1
Civic Unity Party	13,548	0.48	1	0
Azerbaijan Democratic Enlightenment Party	13,279	0.47	1	+1
National Revival Movement Party	12,043	0.42	1	New
Classic Popular Front Party	11,671	0.41	0	0
Azerbaijan Communist Party	11,426	0.40	0	0
Azerbaijani Social Democratic Party	11,288	0.40	1	+1
Azerbaijan National Independence Party	10,526	0.37	0	0
Justice Party	6,507	0.23	0	−1
Azerbaijan People's Party	6,152	0.22	0	0
Citizen and Development Party	3,374	0.12	0	0
Democratic Azerbaijan World Party	3,230	0.11	0	0
Great Azerbaijan Party	2,807	0.10	0	0
Azerbaijan Democratic Party	2,746	0.10	0	0
AMDEP	481	0.02	0	New
Independents	1,150,410	40.50	43	+4
Invalidated			1	–
Total	2,840,839	100.00	125	0
Valid votes	2,840,839	98.83		
Invalid/blank votes	33,696	1.17		
Total votes	2,874,535	100.00		
Registered voters/turnout		55.7		
Source: MSK

== Aftermath ==
=== 2016 District Nº90 rerun ===
The results of this district were invalidated after the 2015 general election. A new election was held on 18 June 2016.

Candidate	Party	Votes	%
Cavid Həmid Osmanov	New Azerbaijan Party	19,674	85.56
İqbal Fehruz Ağazadə	Azerbaijan Hope Party	1,802	7.84
Rəşad Mustafa Abdullayev	Independent	409	1.78
Əli Bəkir Haqverdiyev	Independent	341	1.48
Anar Zamin İbrahimli	Independent	295	1.28
Elmir Şahsəlim Gözəlov	Independent	253	1.10
Rəşid Qalib Gözəlov	Independent	220	0.96
Total		22,994	100.00
