= Azerbaijan Democratic Enlightenment Party =

Azerbaijani political party

Azerbaijan Democratic Enlightenment Party Azərbaycan Demokratik Maarifçilik Partiyası
- Abbreviation: ADMP
- Leader: Elşən Musayev
- Founder: Mammadhanife Musayev
- Founded: 4 August 1995
- Headquarters: Q. Məmmədov 3/20, Xətai raion, Baku
- Membership: 1,000
- National Assembly: 1 / 125

The Azerbaijan Democratic Enlightenment Party (Azerbaijani: Azərbaycan Demokratik Maarifçilik Partiyası, ADMP) is a pro-government political party in Azerbaijan.

== History ==
The party was part of the Reform Bloc in the 2005 parliamentary elections. In the 2015 parliamentary elections it nominated one candidate, Elşən Musayev, who was elected in the Zaqatala constituency.

== Election results ==
=== National Assembly elections ===
Election	Leader	Votes	%	Seats	+/–	Position	Government
1995–1996	Mammadhanife Musayev	43,259	1.2	1 / 125	New	▲9th	Opposition
2000–2001	Did not contest			0 / 125	▼1	—N/a	Extra-parliamentary
2005	Did not contest			0 / 125	0	—N/a	Extra-parliamentary
2010	Elşən Musayev	55	0.00	0 / 125	0	▲33rd	Extra-parliamentary
2015	Elşən Musayev	13,279	0.47	1 / 125	▲0	▲12th	Support
2020	Elşən Musayev	9,004	0.39	1 / 125	0	▲9th	Support
2024	Elşən Musayev	10,432	0.44	1 / 125	0	▲13th	Support
