= Azerbaijan Communist Party (disambiguation) =

Azerbaijan Communist Party may refer to:

- Azerbaijan Communist Party (1920), ruling party of the Azerbaijan Soviet Socialist Republic
- Azerbaijan Communist Party (1993), led by Haji Hajiyev
- Azerbaijan United Communist Party, led by Sayad Sayadov
