= Azerbaijan United Communist Party =

United Communist Party of Azerbaijan Azərbaycan Birləşmiş Kommunyist Partiyası
- Founded: 1993
- Newspaper: Kommunist
- Ideology: Communism; Marxism-Leninism
- Political position: Far-left

Website
- http://kpaz.ru/

The United Communist Party of Azerbaijan (Azerbaijani: Azərbaycan Birləşmiş Kommunist Partiyası) is a political party in Azerbaijan. AVKP was set up in the end of 1993 by the scientist Sayad Sayadov and registered by the Justice Ministry in 1995.

After a split in 1997, AVKP broke into two different parties both named United Communist Party of Azerbaijan, one led by Sayadov and the other led by the Baku City Party Committee Musa Tukanov. The bulk of United Communists sided with Tukanov, who replaced Sayadov as leader at a congress in 1998.

Nonetheless, the Justice Ministry recognizes Sayadov as leader. Sayadov's faction (AVKP-1) is also officially registered while Tukanov's faction (AVKP-2) is unregistered.

In May 2002, Tukanov proposed to set up the Coordination Council of Leftist Forces. Besides the AVKP-2, the Bolsheviks' Organization and the Labors' Union, also Azerbaijan Communist Party (on Platform of Marxism-Leninism) (a party that was formed in 2000, following a split from the AVKP itself) led by Telman Nurullayev intended to join to the CCLF. CCLF is created with the purpose of consolidation of the efforts of the leftist forces "at the struggle for socialism". Founders are trying to change "raptorial capitalist regime". In the words of Tukanov, AVKP-2 and its allies support changing the power through democratic methods in the country. Nevertheless, Tukanov does not also except the revolution way and in his opinion, "revolutionary situation must itself be grown". AVKP-2 supports Azerbaijan's unification to Belarus and Russia union. As to the idea of restoration of the USSR, in Tukanov's opinion, it should take place through a referendum. He thinks if "the representatives of workers" come to power in Azerbaijan, Armenia and Russia, then the Nagorno-Karabakh conflict will also be settled.

In the 2005 Azerbaijan parliamentary election, Sayad Sayadov managed to obtain 8.3% of the votes in the District 12 arriving second after the candidate of the ruling party NAP Mixail Zabelin.

The party itself puts its membership at 7,000.

AVKP publishes Kommunist.
