= Fazail Agamali =

Azerbaijani politician (1947–2026)

D.Sc. Fazail Agamali Member of the National Assembly
- Fəzail Ağamalı
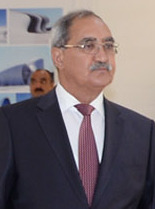
- Agamali in 2013

Member of the National Assembly
- In office 1995–2024
- Constituency: Sumgait City (1995), Yevlakh Rayon (2000), Salyan Rayon (2005, 2010, 2015, 2020)

Acting Minister of Labour and Social Protection of the Population
- In office 1993–1994
- President: Heydar Aliyev

Deputy Minister of Labour and Social Protection of the Population
- In office 1992–1993

Leader of the Motherland Party
- In office 1990–2026

Personal details
- Born: Fazail Rahim ogly Agamali; 27 August 1947 Sisian, Armenian SSR, USSR
- Died: 9 February 2026 (aged 78) Ankara, Turkey
- Party: Motherland Party
- Education: Baku State University
- Profession: Historian, politician
- Awards: Shohrat Order; For service to the Fatherland Order

Fazail Rahim ogly Agamali (Azerbaijani: Fəzail Rəhim oğlu Ağamalı; 27 August 1947 – 9 February 2026) was an Azerbaijani politician, historian and professor with a D.Sc. academic degree. He was the founding leader of the Motherland Party between 1990 and 2026. Agamali was a Member of the National Assembly of Azerbaijan from 1995 to 2024. He served as Deputy and Acting Minister of Labour and Social Protection of the Population between 1992 and 1994.

== Early life ==
Agamali was born in the Sisian district of Armenian SSR on 27 August 1947. He got his first education at Dastakert high school.

He completed his undergraduate studies at Baku State University between 1966 and 1971. During his studies, Agamali became a member of the secret anti-Soviet student organization, which was demanding independence for Azerbaijan.

In the early 1970s, the KGB continually monitored Agamali due to his anti-Soviet activities.

== Academic career ==
In 1972, Agamali was admitted to the graduate school of Baku State University and in 1980, he received the academic degree of Candidate of Historical Sciences.

He gave lectures at Nakhchivan State University, Azerbaijan Technological University and Azerbaijan State University of Economics as an associate professor from 1973 to 1990.

In 2005, Agamali obtained the D.Sc academic degree in history.

== Political career ==
=== Early political career ===
Agamali took an active role in the independence movement in Azerbaijan between 1988 and 1990, and he was a prominent figure of the Azerbaijan Popular Front. However, several controversies arose between him and other movement leaders after the Black January incidents. The process concluded with Agamali's resignation from the Popular Front. After these developments, supporters of Agamali demanded the formation of a new political party. Hence, on 24 November 1990 the founding congress of the Motherland Party took place and Agamali was elected as the chairman of the party.

=== In the cabinet ===
Agamali served as Deputy Minister of Labour and Social Protection of the Population in 1992–1993 and Acting Minister of Labour and Social Protection of the Population in 1993–1994.

=== In the parliament ===
Agamali was elected as the Member of the National Assembly of Azerbaijan in 1995, 2000, 2005, 2010, 2015, 2020 parliamentary elections.

Agamali was a member of the Committee on Legal Policy and State Building, and deputy chairman of the Disciplinary Commission of the Member of the National Assembly of Azerbaijan. Furthermore, he was the leader of the Working Group for Azerbaijani-Turkmen Interparliamentary Relations.

== Personal life and death ==
Agamali was married and had three children. He died after a long illness in Ankara, Turkey, on 9 February 2026, at the age of 78.

== Awards ==
On 25 August 2017, MP Agamali was awarded Shohrat Order by the President of Azerbaijan. Agamali was awarded For service to the Fatherland Order on 25 August 2022 by the President of Azerbaijan.

== See also ==
- Motherland Party
- Politics of Azerbaijan
