= 1995–96 Azerbaijani parliamentary election =

- 12 November 1995
- All 125 seats in the National Assembly; 63 seats needed for a majority
Party	Leader	Vote %	Seats	+/–
New Azerbaijan	Heydar Aliyev	62.7	53	New
Popular Front	Abulfaz Elchibey	9.7	4	−41
AMİP	Etibar Mammadov	9.3	4	New
ADSP	Mahmud Məmmədov	4.0	2	New
Motherland	Fazail Agamali	4.0	1	New
ADİP	Mubariz Gurbanli	3.0	2	New
ADMP	Məmmədhənifə Musayev	1.2	1	New
Musavat	Isa Gambar	–	1	New
Civic Solidarity	Sabir Rustamkhanli	–	1	New
Independents	–	–	55	+40
This lists parties that won seats. See the complete results below.
Chairman of the Supreme Soviet before	Speaker of the National Assembly after
Rasul Guliyev	Rasul Guliyev

Parliamentary elections were held in Azerbaijan on 12 November 1995, with a second round on 26 November. However, the results in 15 constituencies were declared invalid due to fraud, with fresh elections held on 4 February 1996.

The elections were characterized by substantial irregularities. In the lead-up to the elections, the authoritarian regime of Heydar Aliyev (who headed the New Azerbaijan Party) banned Musavat, the major opposition party, from being on the ballot. The government alleged that Musavat had falsified 5,000 signatures to qualify for the ballot.

By election day, eight parties were on the ballot, five of which were pro-government. 60% of candidates in single-member constituencies had been removed from the ballot. Election monitors noted that there was ballot stuffing.

The final result was a victory for the New Azerbaijan Party, which won 53 of the 125 seats in the National Assembly. Voter turnout was 86%.

Under the electoral law introduced prior to the election, 100 of the seats in parliament were elected in single-member districts, while the remaining 25 were elected by party list proportional representation.

== Results ==
Party	Proportional			Constituency			Total seats
Party	Votes	%	Seats	Votes	%	Seats	Total seats
New Azerbaijan Party	2,228,435	62.7	19			34	53
Azerbaijani Popular Front Party	346,092	9.7	3			1	4
Azerbaijan National Independence Party	331,865	9.3	3			1	4
Azerbaijan Democratic Entrepreneurs Party	142,343	4.0	0			2	2
Motherland Party	140,821	4.0	0			1	1
Azerbaijan Democratic Independence Party	106,782	3.0	0			2	2
Azerbaijan Democratic Enlightenment Party	43,259	1.2	0			1	1
Alliance Party for the Sake of Azerbaijan	30,811	0.9	0			0	0
Musavat						1	1
Civic Solidarity Party						1	1
Azerbaijan Social Prosperity Party						0	0
Independents						55	55
Vacant						1	1
None of the above							–
Total			25			100	125
Valid votes	3,415,635	96.05					
Invalid/blank votes	140,642	3.95					
Total votes	3,556,277	100.00					
Registered voters/turnout	4,132,600	86.05					
Source: Nohlen et al. (votes), National Assembly (seats)
