= Motherland Party (Azerbaijan) =

Political party in Azerbaijan

Motherland Party Ana Vətən Partiyası
- Abbreviation: AVP
- Leader: Vacant (Note: Fazail Agamali was the leader of the party from 1990 until his death in 2026.)
- Founded: 24 November 1990
- Registered: 11 August 1992
- Split from: Azerbaijani Popular Front
- Headquarters: Baku
- Membership (2015): 20,000
- Ideology: National conservatism Statism
- Political position: Centre-right
- National Assembly: 1 / 125
- Municipalities: 187 / 1,607

Website
- avp.az

The Motherland Party (Azerbaijani: Ana Vətən Partiyası, AVP) is a pro-government Azerbaijani political party established in 1990, and formally registered in 1992.

== History ==
=== Early years ===
Fazail Agamali took an active role in the independence movement in Azerbaijan between 1988 and 1990 and he was a prominent figure of the Azerbaijan Popular Front. However, a number of controversies arose between him and other movement leaders after the Black January incidents. The process concluded with the resignation of Fazail Agamali from the Popular Front. After these developments, supporters of Agamali demanded the formation of a new political party. Hence, on 24 November 1990 founding congress of the Motherland Party took place and Fazail Agamali elected as the chairman of the party.

=== In the Cabinet ===
AVP first joined an oppositional bloc of parties which was formed for the presidential elections in 1991 and after the presidential election of 1992 the party supported and joined the Government under Abulfaz Elchibey. Following the victory in the presidential elections in 1993 of Heydar Aliyev, the AVP also joined his government. Its party leader Fazail Agamali, was the Minister of Labour and Social Protection of the Population under both presidents.

=== In the Parliament ===
Motherland party actively takes part in the parliament elections, and the party took seats in the National Assembly of Azerbaijan in 1995, 2000, 2005, 2010, 2015, 2020.

== Ideology ==
The party's goal is to create a "free, powerful, democratic and whole Azerbaijan". The fundamentals of the ideological framework of the party is based on the principle of statism.

== Members and organizational structure ==
The Motherland Party (AVP) has a 6-member Political Council and a 14-member Supreme Assembly. The Motherland Party also has a Youth Committee and a Women's Council, as well as raion branches in 55 raions and 4 cities.

The headquarters of the Motherland Party is located in the Narimanov district of Baku. The party has 62 regional organizations. In total, the party has 20.000 members.

== Election results ==
=== National Assembly elections ===
Election	Leader	Votes	%	Seats	+/–	Position	Government
1995–1996	Fazail Agamali	140,821	3.96	1 / 125	New	▲5th	Support
2000–2001	Fazail Agamali			1 / 125	▲1	▼14th	Support
2005	Fazail Agamali			2 / 125	▲1	▲4th	Support
2010	Fazail Agamali	33,275	1.39	2 / 125	0	4th	Support
2015	Fazail Agamali	28,483	0.99	1 / 125	▼1	▼5th	Support
2020	Fazail Agamali	12,587	0.54	1 / 125	0	▼6th	Support
2024	Fazail Agamali	14,466	0.61	1 / 125	0	▼7th	Support

== See also ==
- Fazail Agamali
