= 2000–01 Azerbaijani parliamentary election =

- 5 November 2000
- All 125 seats in the National Assembly; 63 seats needed for a majority
Party	Leader	Vote %	Seats	+/–
New Azerbaijan	Heydar Aliyev	62.3	75	+22
Popular Front	Ali Karimli	11.0	6	+2
Civic Solidarity	Sabir Rustamkhanli	6.4	3	+2
Communist	Ramiz Ahmadov	6.3	2	New
Musavat	Isa Gambar	4.9	2	+1
AMİP	Etibar Mammadov	3.9	2	−2
Alliance		1.0	1	+1
Social Prosperity	Xanhüseyn Kazımlı		1	+1
Motherland	Fazail Agamali		1	0
Compatriot Party	Mais Səfərli		1	New
Independents	–		30	−25
This lists parties that won seats. See the complete results below.
Speaker before	Speaker after
Murtuz Alasgarov	Murtuz Alasgarov

Parliamentary elections were held in Azerbaijan on 5 November 2000, although a re-run had to be held in 11 constituencies on 7 January 2001 due to "massive irregularities". In the lead-up to the election, the authoritarian Heydar Aliyev regime banned seven opposition parties (including Musavat, the major opposition party to Aliyev's New Azerbaijan Party) from contesting the election. The election was characterized as a setback for democracy in Azerbaijan.

The result was a victory for the New Azerbaijan Party, which won 75 of the 125 seats in the National Assembly.

== Results ==
Party	Proportional			Constituency			Total seats	+/–
Party	Votes	%	Seats	Votes	%	Seats	Total seats	+/–
New Azerbaijan Party		62.3	16			59	75	+22
Azerbaijani Popular Front Party		11.0	4			2	6	+2
Civic Solidarity Party		6.4	3			0	3	+2
Azerbaijan Communist Party		6.3	2			0	2	New
Musavat		4.9	0			2	2	+1
Azerbaijan National Independence Party		3.9	0			2	2	–2
Azerbaijan Liberal Party		1.3	0			0	0	New
Azerbaijan Democrat Party		1.1	0			0	0	New
Alliance Party for the Sake of Azerbaijan		1.0	0			1	1	+1
National Congress Party		0.5	0			0	0	New
Azerbaijan Democratic Bloc		0.4	0			0	0	New
Azerbaijan People's Democratic Party		0.3	0			0	0	New
Democratic Party of the Azerbaijan World		0.3	0			0	0	New
Azerbaijan Social Prosperity Party						1	1	+1
Motherland Party						1	1	0
Compatriot Party						1	1	New
Independents						30	30	–22
None of the above							–	–
Vacant						1	1	–
Total			25			100	125	0
Registered voters/turnout	4,304,952	–						
Source: Nohlen et al., IPU
