= Justice, Law, Democracy Party =

Azerbaijani political party

Justice, Law, Democracy Party Ədalət, Hüquq, Demokratiya Partiyası
- Abbreviation: ƏHD Partiyası
- Chairman: Gudrat Hasanguliyev
- General Secretary: Yaşar Kələntərli
- Secretary for International Affairs: Elçin Mirzəbəyli
- Vice-chairmen: Əli Həziquliyev; Niyaməddin Orduxanlı
- Founded: 3 April 2004
- Registered: 12 August 2005
- Split from: Azerbaijani Popular Front Party
- Headquarters: Seyidov küç.23, Yasamal raion, Baku
- Newspaper: Xalq Cəbhəsi
- Membership (2015): 15,000
- Ideology: Social conservatism; Economic liberalism; Azerbaijani irredentism
- Political position: Centre-right to right-wing
- European affiliation: European Conservatives and Reformists Party (until 2022)
- Slogan: Ədalət, Hüquq, Demokratiya ('Justice, Law, Democracy') (since 2024) (Note: The party's slogan was previously Bütöv və Qüdrətli Azərbaycan uğrunda ('For a Whole and Mighty Azerbaijan') until 2024.)
- National Assembly: 2 / 125

Website
- baxcp.az

The Justice, Law, Democracy Party (Azerbaijani: Ədalət, Hüquq, Demokratiya Partiyası, ƏHD), formerly called the Whole Azerbaijan Popular Front Party (Azerbaijani: Bütöv Azərbaycan Xalq Cəbhəsi Partiyası, BAXCP), is a political party in Azerbaijan. It split from the opposition Azerbaijani Popular Front in 2004.

At the parliamentary election of 1 November 2015 the party won 1 out of 125 seats.

The party was a member of the European Conservatives and Reformists Party until 2022.

On March 16, 2024, the VII Congress of the Whole Azerbaijan Popular Front Party was held, and the proposal to change the name of the party to Justice, Law, Democracy Party was voted and accepted.

== Election results ==
=== Presidential elections ===
Election	Party candidate	Votes	%	Result
2008	Gudrat Hasanguliyev	83,037	2.28%	Lost ✗
2013	Gudrat Hasanguliyev	73,702	1.99%	Lost ✗
2018	Gudrat Hasanguliyev	119,311	3.02%	Lost ✗
2024	Gudrat Hasanguliyev	85,411	1.72%	Lost ✗

=== National Assembly elections ===
Election	Leader	Votes	%	Seats	+/–	Position	Government
2005	Gudrat Gasanguliev			1 / 125	New	▲9th	Opposition
2010	Gudrat Gasanguliev	24,499	1.03	1 / 125	0	▲7th	Opposition
2015	Gudrat Gasanguliev	42,459	1.49	1 / 125	0	▲2nd	Opposition
2020	Gudrat Gasanguliev	16,189	0.69	1 / 125	0	▼4th	Opposition
2024	Gudrat Gasanguliev	32,220	1.35	2 / 125	▲1	▲3rd	Opposition
