= Great Order Party =

Azerbaijani political party

Great Order Party Böyük Quruluş Partiyası
- Abbreviation: BQP
- Leader: Fazil Mustafa
- Founder: Fazil Mustafa
- Founded: 2003
- Registered: 12 August 2005
- Headquarters: Baku
- Membership (2023): 5,000+
- Ideology: Liberalism; Liberal democracy Structuralism
- Political position: Centre-right; Before 2006: Centre-left
- Colours: Azerbaijan national colours: Blue; Red; Green
- Slogan: «Our name is a great structure, our pure oath will go down in history!» (Azerbaijani: «Böyük quruluşdur bizim adımız, tarixdə qalacaq təmiz andımız!»)
- National Assembly: 1 / 125
- PACE: 1 / 648

Website
- bqp.az

The Great Order Party (Azerbaijani: Böyük Quruluş Partiyası) is a liberal political party in Azerbaijan.

At the parliamentary elections of 6 November 2005 the party won 1 out of 125 seats.

Fazil Mustafa has been the party's only Member of parliament.

== Election results ==
=== Presidential elections ===
Election	Party candidate	Votes	%	Result
2008	Fazil Mustafa	89,985	2.47%	Lost ✗
2024	Fazil Mustafa	98,421	1.99%	Lost ✗

=== National Assembly elections ===
Election	Leader	Votes	%	Seats	+/–	Position	Government
2005	Fazil Mustafa			1 / 125	New	▲5th	Opposition
2010	Fazil Mustafa	17,389	0.73	1 / 125	0	▼11th	Opposition
2015	Fazil Mustafa	34,156	1.20	1 / 125	0	▲4th	Opposition
2020	Fazil Mustafa	15,846	0.68	1 / 125	0	▼5th	Opposition
2024	Fazil Mustafa	8,651	0.36	1 / 125	0	14th	Opposition
