= Compatriot Party (Azerbaijan) =

Political Party

The Compatriot Party (Yurddaş Partiyası) is a political party in Azerbaijan.

At the last elections (November 5, 2000 and January 7, 2001), the party won 1 out of 125 seats.

The first chairman of the party was Mais Safarli until 2020 .
