= Azerbaijan Communist Party (1993) =

Azerbaijani political party

Azerbaijan Communist Party Azərbaycan Kommunist Partiyası Азəрбаjҹан Коммунист Партиjасы
- Abbreviation: AzKP
- Chairman: Rauf Qurbanov
- Founder: Ramiz Ahmedov
- Founded: 1993
- Preceded by: Azerbaijan Communist Party (1920)
- Headquarters: Baku
- Newspaper: Azərbaycan Həqiqəti ("Azerbaijan Truth")
- Ideology: Communism; Marxism–Leninism; Left-conservatism; Soviet patriotism
- Political position: Far-left
- International affiliation: IMCWP
- Continental affiliation: UCP-CPSU; CPSU (2001)
- Colors: Red

The Azerbaijan Communist Party (Azerbaijani: Azərbaycan Kommunist Partiyası, AzKP; Азəрбаjҹан Коммунист Партиjасы, АКП) is a Marxist-Leninist party in Azerbaijan. AzKP was set up in 1993 by Ramiz Ahmedov (6 March 1939 – 10 September 2007) and registered by the Justice Ministry in 1994.

Note that there are two parties named "Communist Party of Azerbaijan". They are completely different parties, with completely different leaders. One is a member of the "UPC-CPSU", while the other one is a member of the "CPSU (2001)".

== Ideology ==
The AzKP criticizes United States politics in the region. In 2004 after the US State Department told that US was not planning to impose sanctions on Nagorno Karabakh, Ahmedov said that the Americans underhandedly supported the Armenian interests and that Washington was not interested in the settlement of the conflict. He also added that the great powers are making use of the Karabakh conflict for their own interests.

The AzKP was strongly against the Azeri participation into the Iraq War and it often expressed solidarity to Palestinian people and Cuba.

== Factions ==
=== 1996 ===
A splinter group from the main Communist Party of Azerbaijan (led by Firudin Hasanov) was formed in 1996. CPA-2 developed close relation with the government of the country and for a brief period it was the only legally registered communist party in the country.

Hasanov was a candidate in Azerbaijan's 1998 presidential election and he arrived fourth obtaining 29.224 votes (0.87%). Leaders of the other Azeri communist parties describe Hasanov as a "traitor" for his collaboration with the government.

In 2000 the newspaper "Bu Gün" reported that Hasanov was considering a merger with the ruling New Azerbaijan Party (NAP), but the party's press secretary Seyran Veliev refuted such claims, saying they had no intention of merging with the NAP.

=== 2011 ===
It was refounded on 31 October 2011 via the merger of the Azerbaijan Communist Party (on Platform of Marxism–Leninism) (ACP-PM-L) and the Communist Party of Azerbaijan headed by Alasgar Khalilov. At the unification congress Telman Nurullayev, the former head of the (AKP-PML), was elected the party's First Secretary and was also elected to the Politburo. Representatives from fraternal communist parties, such as the Socialist Party of Latvia and the Communist Party of the Soviet Union, were presented at the congress.

== Leaders ==
On 10 September 2007, party chief Ramiz Ahmedov died after a long illness. His body was sent for burial in his native Quba. From 2000 to 2005 Ahmedov had been a member of the National Assembly of Azerbaijan.

Rauf Qurbanov was elected chairman of the party after a long dispute with Rustam Shahsuvarov. Qurbanov briefly abdicated to Haci Haciyev, but later returned to office.

The current Chairman of the Central Committee of the Communist Party of Azerbaijan affiliated with the Union of Communist Parties – Communist Party of the Soviet Union is Rauf Qurbanov.

== Results ==
The party claims that it has 60,000 members. The party publishes the newspaper Azərbaycan Həqiqəti.

In the parliamentary election of 5 November 2000 and 7 January 2001, the party won 6.3% of the popular vote and 2 out of 125 seats.

In the parliamentary elections of 6 November 2005 won no seats, but the chairman Ramiz Ahmadov was not running due to health problems.

In the municipal election of 17 December 2004, the party did very well and it elected 128 members to the local municipalities.

In the presidential election of 15 October 2008, the AzKP supported the candidate from the Yeni Azerbaijan ruling party, current president of Azerbaijan Ilham Aliyev.

The AzKP is part of the Communist Party of the Soviet Union (2001).

=== Presidential elections ===
Election	Party candidate	Votes	%	Result
1998	Firudin Hasanov	29,244	0.89%	Lost ✗

=== National Assembly elections ===
Election	Leader	Votes	%	Seats	+/–	Position	Government
2000–2001	Ramiz Ahmadov		6.3	2 / 125	New	▲4th	Opposition
2005	Ramiz Ahmadov			0 / 125	▼2	▼	Extra-parliamentary
2010	Ramiz Ahmadov	6,942	0.29	0 / 125	0	▲17th	Extra-parliamentary
2015	Ramiz Ahmadov	11,426	0.40	0 / 125	0	▲15th	Extra-parliamentary
2020	Ramiz Ahmadov	957	0.04	0 / 125	0	▼23rd	Extra-parliamentary
