= Azerbaijan Technological University =

Technical university in Ganja, Azerbaijan

- Azərbaycan Texnologiya Universiteti
- Type: Public
- Established: 1981
- Rector: Yashar Adil oglu Omarov
- Location: Ganja, Azerbaijan; 40°41′19″N 46°23′13″E
- Campus: Urban
- Website: uteca.edu.az
- Location in Azerbaijan Azerbaijan Technological University (Caucasus Mountains)

The Azerbaijan Technological University (Azerbaijani: Azərbaycan Texnologiya Universiteti) trains mechanical and technological engineers in the fields of textile, light, and food industries. It is located in Ganja, Azerbaijan and was established in 1981.

== History ==
Based on the presidential decree on “Improvement of the educational system” dated 13 August 2000, the Azerbaijan Technological University was founded on October 11, 2000. The university was established by the expansion of the branches of the Azerbaijan Technological Institute by the order of the Ministry of Education of the Republic of Azerbaijan.

The Azerbaijan Technology Institute was founded by the initiation of Heydar Aliyev in 1981 who was then First Secretary of the Communist Party of Azerbaijan.

There are four faculties, a department of postgraduate and master studies, research sector, library, resource center for the English language, computer and information center, industrial labs, and a gym at the university.

== Rector ==
By the order of the Minister of Science and Education of the Republic of Azerbaijan dated 25.07.2022, the position of rector of the Azerbaijan Technological University was entrusted to Yashar Adil oglu Omarov.

== Faculties ==
=== Faculty of Mechanics and Metallurgical engineering ===
The faculty was established under the name of “Mechanics” in 1979. There are six specialties within the faculty:

- Machine engineering
- Process automation engineering
- Electronics, telecommunication and radio engineering
- Technological machines and devices engineering
- Transportation and organization of management engineering
- Metrology, standardization and certification engineering

=== Faculty of Food and Textile ===
- Service in the sociocultural sphere
- Tourism and hotel business
- Engineering of food
- Technology and consumer goods marketing
- Technology consumer goods
- Metrology, Standardization and Certification
- Design

=== Faculty of Automation Telecommunication and Information Technology ===
The faculty was created in 1989.

- Customs Expertise
- Communication system and communication center
- Environmental Engineering
- Environmental protection and efficient use of natural resources
- Expertise of consumer goods and marketing
- State and municipal management
- Technology of Consumer
- Legal economy settlement
