= National Solidarity Party (Azerbaijan) =

- Chairperson: Alisahib Vali oghlu Huseynov (Azerbaijani: Əlisahib Vəli oğlu Hüseynov)
- Founder: Mammad Alizade
- Founded: 1992
- Ideology: Centrism

Website
- http://mhp.az/

The National Solidarity Party (Azerbaijani: Milli Həmrəylik Partiyası), formerly Democratic Azerbaijani World Party (Azerbaijani: Demokratik Azərbaycan Dünyası Partiyası), is a political party in Azerbaijan. It was founded by Mammed Alizde in 1992 as a Democratic Azerbaijani World Party. In 1996 the party joined the major parties Council of the Assembly. From 2001 the party has been leading this Assembly. In 2020 the party changed its name to National Solidarity Party.

The basic principles of the party are to defend sovereignty of Azerbaijan and to create a civil society.

== Information ==
Party's ideology is based on building a democratic, just social society, while the position in the political system is centrist.

There are 133,280 members in the party and it has 78 city and regional organizations. So far, only three congresses has been held, while congresses are held every 5 years. The last congress was attended by 271 people.

The elected bodies of the party are the chairman, the Control and Inspection Commission, the Board, the chairmen of city and district organizations. Young people make up 16% of the total members, and women 30%.

The party's means of public relations are mainly independent media. In the 2008 presidential elections, the party supported candidate Ilham Aliyev. Although 57 candidates were nominated in the 2005 parliamentary elections, none were elected. And 300 people ran in the 2009 municipal elections, only three were elected to the municipality.

The party's attitude to the dialogue between the government and the opposition is very positive. It considers it necessary for the development of society. The party supports re-registration, state support and the adoption of new legislation to optimize the political system.
