= 2005 Azerbaijani parliamentary election =

- 6 November 2005
- All 125 seats in the National Assembly; 63 seats needed for a majority
Party	Leader	Seats	+/–
New Azerbaijan	Ilham Aliyev	61	−14
Musavat	Isa Gambar	5	+3
Civic Solidarity	Sabir Rustamkhanli	3	0
Motherland	Fazail Agamali	2	+1
Hope	İqbal Ağazadə	1	New
Justice	Ilyas Ismayilov	1	New
DİP	Asim Mollazadə	1	New
BAXCP	Gudrat Gasanguliev	1	New
Great Order	Fazil Mustafa	1	New
Civic Unity	Sabir Hacıyev	1	New
Social Prosperity	Xanhüseyn Kazımlı	1	0
Popular Front	Ali Karimli	1	−5
Independents	–	46	+16
This lists parties that won seats. See the complete results below.
Speaker before	Speaker after
Murtuz Alasgarov	Ogtay Asadov

Parliamentary elections were held in Azerbaijan on 6 November 2005. The ruling New Azerbaijan Party (NAP) won 61 of the 125 seats in the National Assembly.

The elections were not free and fair. Opposition parties were intimidated during the election, campaign workers for opposition parties were imprisoned, and there were allegations of vote-rigging. The coverage by media, whether state-run or private, was overwhelmingly pro-government. Dissident media stations were shut down and journalists were repressed. Freedom of assembly was restricted, preventing opposition parties from holding rallies. Workers were threatened with dismissal unless they voted for the incumbent government. In 2010, the European Court of Human Rights ruled that the Aliyev regime had engaged in electoral fraud.

== Conduct ==
Human Rights Watch expressed concern about widespread intimidation of opposition supporters ahead of the elections, saying that the elections could not be free or fair under such conditions. Several opposition leaders were arrested two days before the elections.

ARTICLE 19 said Azerbaijani authorities were responsible for the violent harassment of journalists covering opposition rallies, frequent attacks and forced closure of independent media outlets, and widespread abuse of state and local resources in favour of pro-government candidates. The Organization for Security and Co-operation in Europe reported that the vote counting process was "bad or very bad in 43 per cent of counts observed." However, observers from the Commonwealth of Independent States claimed the irregularities "were not of mass character and did not have [an] impact on the free expression of voters' will".

The opposition had hoped for another color revolution, but analysts doubted this would happen. Movements like Yox!, Yeni Fikir or Meqam were not yet ready for revolution according to Emin Huseynov, founder of Meqam.

== Results ==
The Central Election Commission reported, with 28% of votes counted, 62% win for the NAP, 3% for the Equality Party, 1% for the APFP, 2% for independent candidates and 2% each for two other small parties. These results were contradicted by a Mitofsky International and Edison Media Research poll which predicted the NAP going from 75 to 56 seats in the 125-member assembly, with the Azadliq bloc winning 12 seats.

The Election Commission ruled that the results in four districts were invalid and the Constitutional Court annulled the results in a further six. There was a re-run in the ten districts on 13 May 2006 in which the New Azerbaijan Party won five seats, the Justice Party one, the Civic Solidarity Party one and independents three.

Party	Seats	+/–
New Azerbaijan Party	61	–14
Musavat	5	+3
Civic Solidarity Party	2	–1
Motherland Party	2	+1
Azerbaijan Hope Party	1	New
Azerbaijan Social Prosperity Party	1	0
Justice Party	1	New
Democratic Reforms Party	1	New
Whole Azerbaijan Popular Front Party	1	New
Great Order Party	1	New
Civic Unity Party	1	New
Azerbaijani Popular Front Party	1	–5
Azerbaijan Democrat Party	0	0
Independents	46	+16
Annulled	1	–
Total	125	0
Source: CNIS, CAD
