= Gudrat Gasanguliev =

Azerbaijani politician

- Qüdrət Həsənquliyev
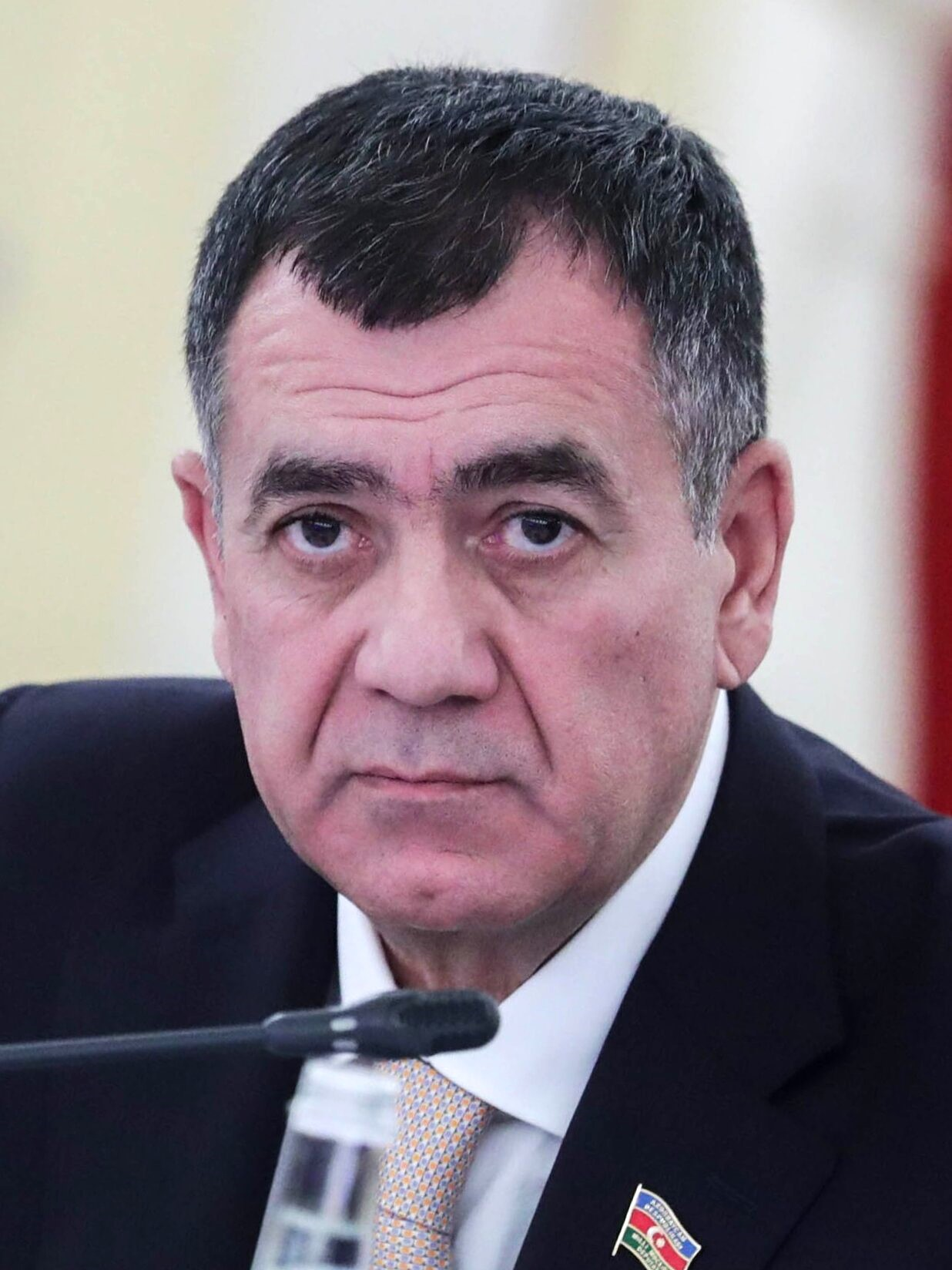
- Gasanguliev in 2023

Chairman of the Whole Azerbaijan Popular Front Party
- Incumbent
- Assumed office 4 April 2004
- Preceded by: Position established

Member of Azerbaijani Parliament
- Incumbent
- Assumed office 5 March 2003

Personal details
- Born: Gudrat Gasanguliev; 29 January 1965 (age 61) Abragunus, Dzhulfa District, Nakhichevan ASSR, Azerbaijan SSR, Soviet Union
- Citizenship: Azerbaijani
- Party: BAXCP (since 2004)
- Children: 2
- Education: Baku State University
- Occupation: Politician

Gudrat Gasanguliev (Azerbaijani: Qüdrət Müzəffər oğlu Həsənquliyev, born 29 January 1965) is an Azerbaijani politician, and the chairman of the Whole Azerbaijan Popular Front Party (BAXCP) since 2004. He is also the Member of the National Assembly since 2003. He unsuccessfully contested for presidential elections since 2003, in which he lost to the incumbent President Ilkham Aliyev.

Gasanguliev was born on 29 January 1965 in the village of Abragunus, Dzhulfa District, Nakhichevan Autonomous Soviet Socialist Republic. He graduated with honours from the Faculty of Law of Baku State University. Prior to entering politics, he worked as an investigator in the prosecutor's office of the Nasimi District of Baku, assistant to the Secretary of State of Azerbaijan, and as a senior lecturer at Baku Asia University.

Although Gasanguliev started his political career in the Azerbaijan Popular Front Party (AXCP), he withdrew from the party in 2002 due to internal conflicts. He was firstly elected to the National Assembly in 2003.

Gasanguliev supports renaming the country's name to "Northern Azerbaijan". He, who criticises the country for being an undemocratic, supports the parliamentary system with a symbolic President and executive Prime Minister.
