= Fazil Mustafa =

Azerbaijani politician (born 1965)

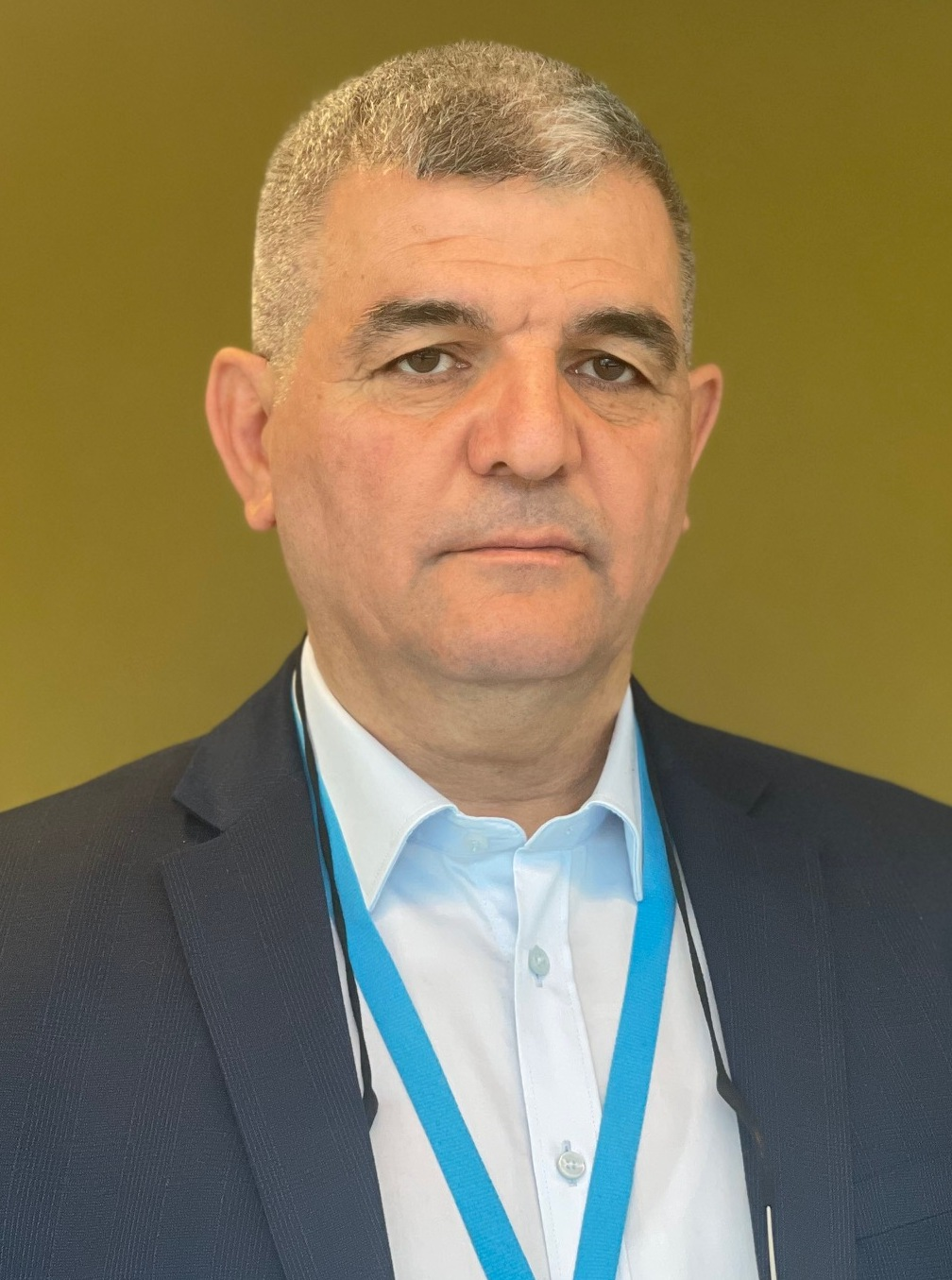
- Mustafa in 2024

Member of the National Assembly for the 26th Sabunchu constituency of Baku
- Incumbent
- Assumed office 2005

Personal details
- Born: 19 October 1965 (age 60) Nakhchivan, Nakhchivan ASSR, Azerbaijan SSR, USSR
- Party: Great Order Party

Fazil Mustafa, formerly known as Fazil Gazanfaroglu, (Azerbaijani: Fazil Qəzənfəroğlu, born 19 October 1965) is a deputy of the III, IV, V, and VI convocations of the National Assembly of Azerbaijan.

== History ==
Fazil Mustafa was born on 19 October 1965, in the city of Nakhchivan. He graduated from Nakhchivan City Secondary School No. 10 in 1982 and worked as a laborer at Nakhchivan Construction Trust No. 5 from 1982 to 1984. He then served in the former Soviet Armed Forces in Ukraine as a regular soldier from 1984 to 1986. In 1986, he enrolled in the Faculty of Law at Baku State University and graduated with a degree in law in 1991.

He served as an adviser to the President of the Azerbaijan Popular Front from 1991 to 1992 and as the head of the APC Analytical Center in 1992. From 1992 to 1993, he worked as the Director of the State-Legal Department at the Presidential Administration of the Republic of Azerbaijan. From 1995 to 1998, he served as the APC's representative in Turkey. During the split within the Azerbaijan Popular Front Party in 2000, he joined the Classic wing led by Mirmahmud Mirəlioğlu.

From 1998 to 2001, he worked as the APC's Deputy Chairman for Political Affairs. From 2001 to 2003, he served as a platoon commander in the combat zone of the Armed Forces of the Republic of Azerbaijan with the rank of First Lieutenant. In 2003, he founded the Great Order Party and was elected its leader at the first congress. He was re-elected as party leader in 2006, 2009, 2012, 2016, and 2020.

He was chosen in the fourth, fifth, and sixth convocations of the Azerbaijani National Assembly in 2005, 2010, 2015, and 2020 to serve as a deputy. He finished third with 89,985 votes and 2.43% of the vote in the 2008 presidential election. He was chosen in 2009 to serve on the Azerbaijan Bar Association's executive committee. He was chosen to serve as a member and vice-president of the Special Olympics Committee's executive committee in 2016.

Currently, Fazil Mustafa serves as the Deputy Chairman of the Committee on Culture of the National Assembly of Azerbaijan and is a member of the Azerbaijani delegation to the Parliamentary Assembly of the Council of Europe. He has authored 19 books and hundreds of scientific and journalistic articles published in Turkey and Azerbaijan. He is married and has two children.

=== 2023 assassination attempt ===
On 28 March 2023, Azerbaijani MP Fazil Mustafa was the target of a "terrorist attack" at his residence in Baku. He sustained multiple gunshot wounds and is currently undergoing medical treatment. The attack was carried out using Kalashnikov bullets and was strongly condemned by the Azerbaijani government. The authorities have launched a search for the perpetrators, and speculation has arisen that the attack was politically motivated due to Mustafa's criticism of Iran.

On 31 March 2023, Azerbaijan's Ministry of Foreign Affairs revealed that initial investigations into the attack suggested Iran's involvement.

On 3 April 2023, a spokesman for Azerbaijan's interior ministry announced 4 people had been arrested in connection to the attack.
