= List of political parties in Azerbaijan =

This article lists political parties in Azerbaijan. Azerbaijan is a one party dominant state. Opposition parties against the New Azerbaijan Party are functioning, but are widely considered to have no real chance of gaining power.

As of 2022, 59 political parties are officially registered in Azerbaijan. Ten of them are represented in the National Assembly of Azerbaijan.

== Parties represented in the National Assembly ==
Name	Abbr.	Founded	Leader	Ideology	Milli Majlis	Political position	Alliances
New Azerbaijan Party; Yeni Azərbaycan Partiyası	YAP	1992	Ilham Aliyev	Azerbaijani nationalism; Conservatism; Authoritarianism	68 / 125	Right-wing	
Civic Solidarity Party; Vətəndaş Həmrəyliyi Partiyası	VHP	1992	Sabir Rustamkhanli	National conservatism; Populism	3 / 125	Right-wing	
Justice, Law, Democracy Party; Ədalət, Hüquq, Demokratiya Partiyası	ƏHD	2004	Gudrat Hasanguliyev	Azerbaijani irredentism	2 / 125	Centre-right to right-wing	
Republican Alternative Party; Respublikaçı Alternativ Partiyası	REAL	2009	Ilgar Mammadov	Republicanism; Liberal democracy; National liberalism; Secularism; Pro-Europeanism	1 / 125	Centre to centre-right	
Great Azerbaijan Party; Böyük Azərbaycan Partiyası	BAP		Elşad Musayev		1 / 125		
Motherland Party; Ana Vətən Partiyası	AVP	1990	Fazail Agamali	Azerbaijani nationalism; National conservatism; Azerbaijani irredentism	1 / 125	Right-wing	
Azerbaijan National Independence Party; Azərbaycan Milli İstiqlal Partiyası	AMİP	1992	Etibar Mammadov	Liberal conservatism	1 / 125	Centre-right	
National Front Party; Milli Cəbhə Partiyası	MCP	2015	Razi Nurullayev	Azerbaijani nationalism	1 / 125	Right-wing	
Democratic Reforms Party; Demokratik İslahatlar Partiyası	DİP	2005	Asim Mollazade	Reformism	1 / 125	Radical centre	
Azerbaijan Democratic Enlightenment Party; Azərbaycan Demokratik Maarifçilik Partiyası	ADMP	1995	Elshan Musayev	Conservatism	1 / 125	Centre-right	
Great Order Party; Böyük Quruluş Partiyası	BQP	2003	Fazil Mustafa	Liberalism; Liberal democracy Structuralism	1 / 125	Centre-right	

== Other parties ==
Name	Abbr.	Founded	Leader	Ideology	Political position	Alliances
National Revival Movement Party; Milli Dirçəliş Hərəkatı Partiyası	MDHP	2003	Faraj Guliyev	Azerbaijani nationalism		
Azerbaijan Hope Party; Azərbaycan Ümid Partiyası	ÜMİD	1993	Igbal Agazade	Social justice	Centre-right	Formerly as VBP: PACE: SOC
Unity Party; Vəhdət Partiyası	VƏHDƏT	1994	Tahir Kerimli	Political unionism	Centre	

- Azerbaijan Communist Party (Azərbaycan Kommunist Partiyası)
- Azerbaijan Democrat Party (Azərbaycan Demokrat Partiyası)
- Azerbaijan Liberal Democrat Party (Azərbaycan Liberal Demokrat Partiyası)
- Azerbaijan National Democrat Party (Azərbaycan Milli Demokrat Partiyası)
- Azerbaijan National Statehood Party (Azərbaycan Milli Dövlətçilik Partiyası)
- Azerbaijani Popular Front Party (Azərbaycan Xalq Cəbhəsi Partiyası)
- Azerbaijan People's Party (Azərbaycan Xalq Partiyası)
- Azerbaijan Republicans Party (Azərbaycan Respublikaçılar Partiyası)
- Azerbaijan United Communist Party (Azərbaycan Vahid Kommunist Partiyası)
- Citizen and Development Party (Vətəndaş və İnkişaf Partiyası)
- Classic People's Front Party (Klassik Xalq Cəbhəsi Partiyasi)
- Free Homeland Party (Qarabağ Azadlıq Təşkilatı)
- Future Azerbaijan Party (Gələcək Azərbaycan Partiyası)
- Justice Party (Ədalət Partiyası)
- Gorgud Party (Qorqud Partiyası)
- Independent Azerbaijan Party (Müstəqil Azərbaycan Partiyası)
- Independent Democrats Party (Azad Demokratlar Partiyası)
- Independent People's Party (Müstəqil Xalq Partiyası)
- Intelligents Party (Aydınlar Partiyası)
- Modern Musavat Party (Müasir Müsavat Partiyası)
- Musavat (Müsavat)
- National Democratic Party of Cognition (Milli Demokrat İdrak Partiyası)
- National Solidarity Party (Milli Həmrəylik Partiyası)
- National Unity Party (Milli Vəhdət Partiyası)
- New Time Party (Yeni Zaman Partiyası)
- Republican People's Party (Cümhuriyyət Xalq Partiyası)
- Right Justice Party (Haqq Ədalət Partiyası)
- United Azerbaijan National Unity Party (Vahid Azərbaycan Milli Birlik Partiyası)
- White Party (Ağ Partiyası)
- Azerbaijani Free Democrats Party

== Defunct parties ==
- Alliance Party for the Sake of Azerbaijan (Azərbaycan Naminə Alyans Partiyası)
- Azerbaijan Liberal Party (Azərbaycan Liberal Partiyası)
- Azerbaijani Social Democratic Party (Azerbaycan Sosial Demokrat Partiyası)
- Azerbaijan Social Prosperity Party (Azərbaycan Sosial Rifah Partiyası)
- Civic Unity Party (Vətəndaş Birliyi Partiyası)

== See also ==
- Lists of political parties

== Bibliography ==
- "List of Azerbaijani political parties (2022)" Central Election Commission of Azerbaijan (in Azerbaijani)
