= 2013 Azerbaijani presidential election =

Presidential Elections held in 2013 in Azerbaijan, considered rigged

- 9 October 2013
- Turnout: 71.62%
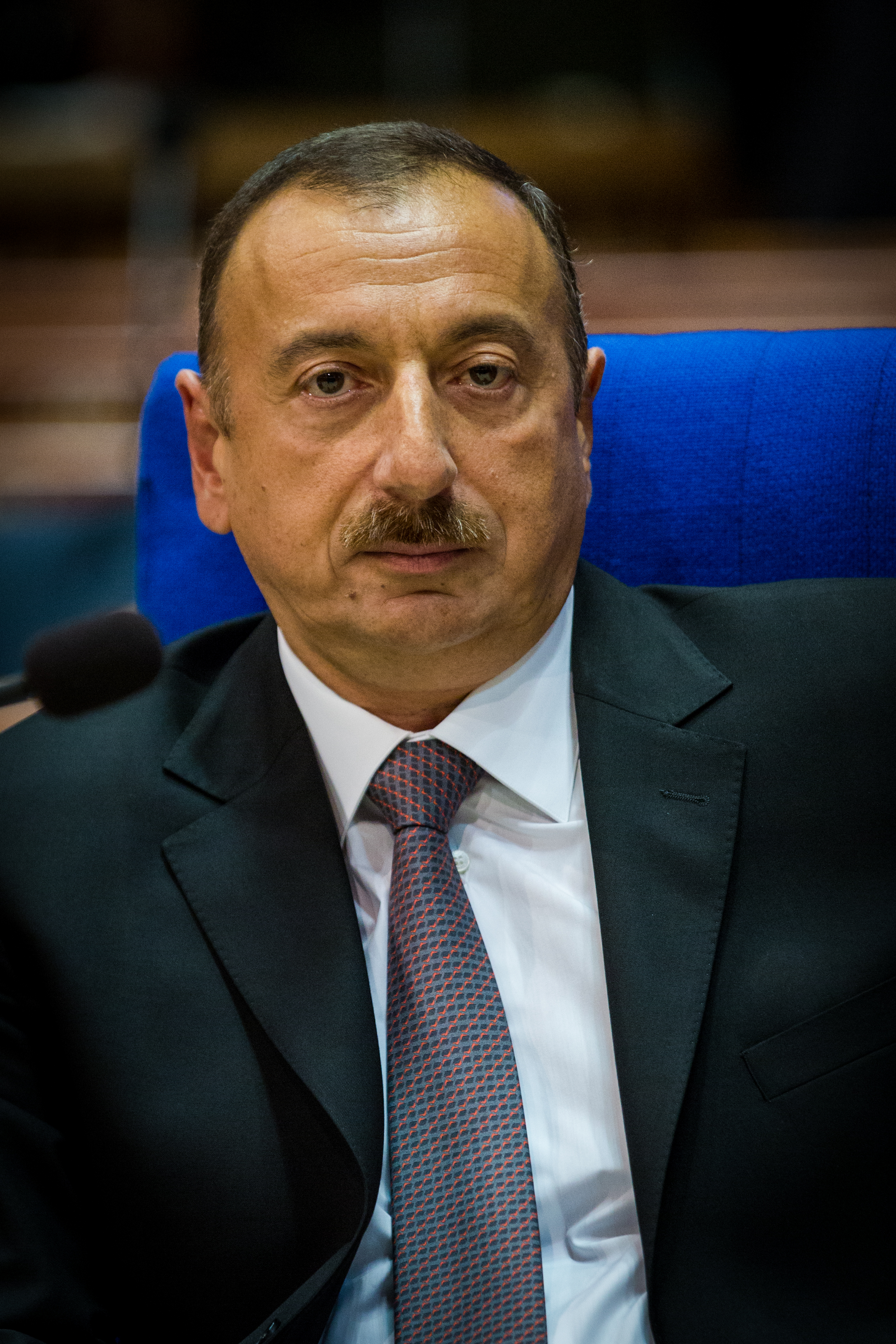

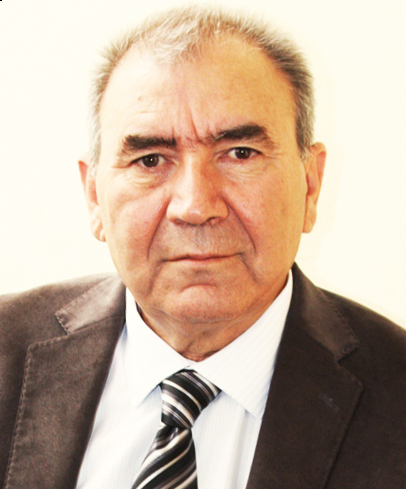
Nominee	Ilham Aliyev	Jamil Hasanli
Party	New Azerbaijan	NCDF
Popular vote	3,126,113	204,642
Percentage	84.54%	5.53%
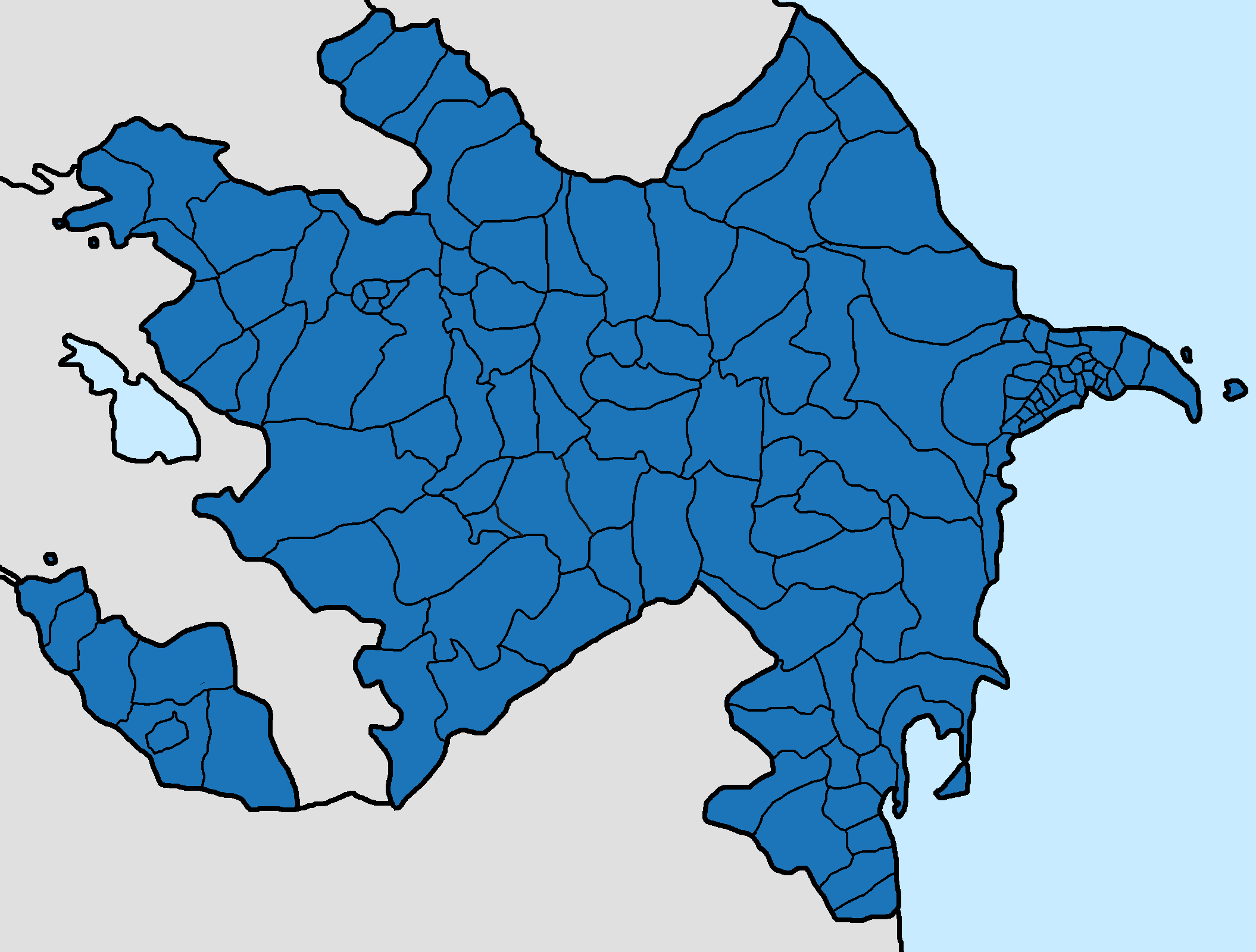
- Results by constituency Ilham Aliyev
President before election
Ilham Aliyev
New Azerbaijan
Elected President
Ilham Aliyev
New Azerbaijan

Presidential elections were held in Azerbaijan on 9 October 2013. The result was a victory for incumbent President Ilham Aliyev, who received a reported 85% of the vote, whilst leading opposition candidate Jamil Hasanli finished second with a reported 6% of the vote.

The elections were marred by claims of irregularities; official results were accidentally released by the government's Central Election Commission through a mobile app before voting began, giving Aliyev a victory with 73% of the vote. The commission later recalled the results, claiming that they were taken from the 2008 elections. The claim was disputed, given that the results accidentally released included the candidates from the 2013 elections, and that the percentages differed from the 2008 results.

Opposition candidates were imprisoned and faced restrictions in the lead-up to the elections, which led the European Court of Human Rights to issue a judgment against the Aliyev regime. The Aliyev regime put up numerous non-genuine candidates to confuse voters and dilute support for opposition candidates. Freedom of speech was restricted prior to the elections. OSCE monitors reported candidate and voter intimidation and a restrictive media environment, including arrests and the use of force against journalists and activists. 92% of the coverage on the six main TV channels was dedicated to the incumbent president.

== Background ==
All previous elections in Azerbaijan observed by OSCE fell short of meeting international standards.

In 2009, an amendment was made to the Constitution of Azerbaijan, which abolished the limit of two consecutive presidential terms and allowed incumbent Aliyev, who had already served for two terms, to run for president for unlimited number of times. The constitutional amendment was condemned by the Venice Commission of the Council of Europe, which stated that "the abolition of existing limits preventing the unlimited re-election of a President is a step back, in terms of democratic achievements". The amendment was also criticized by the Azerbaijani opposition. On the basis of the amendment in 2013 Ilham Aliyev ran for president for the third time.

After his visit to Azerbaijan the President of the Parliamentary Assembly of the Council of Europe Jean-Claude Mignon called on the authorities to fully respect their obligations.

However, overall, in 2013 elections the Central Election Commission (CEC) demonstrated efficiency in administrative preparations for the elections and observed the legal deadlines.

== Candidates ==
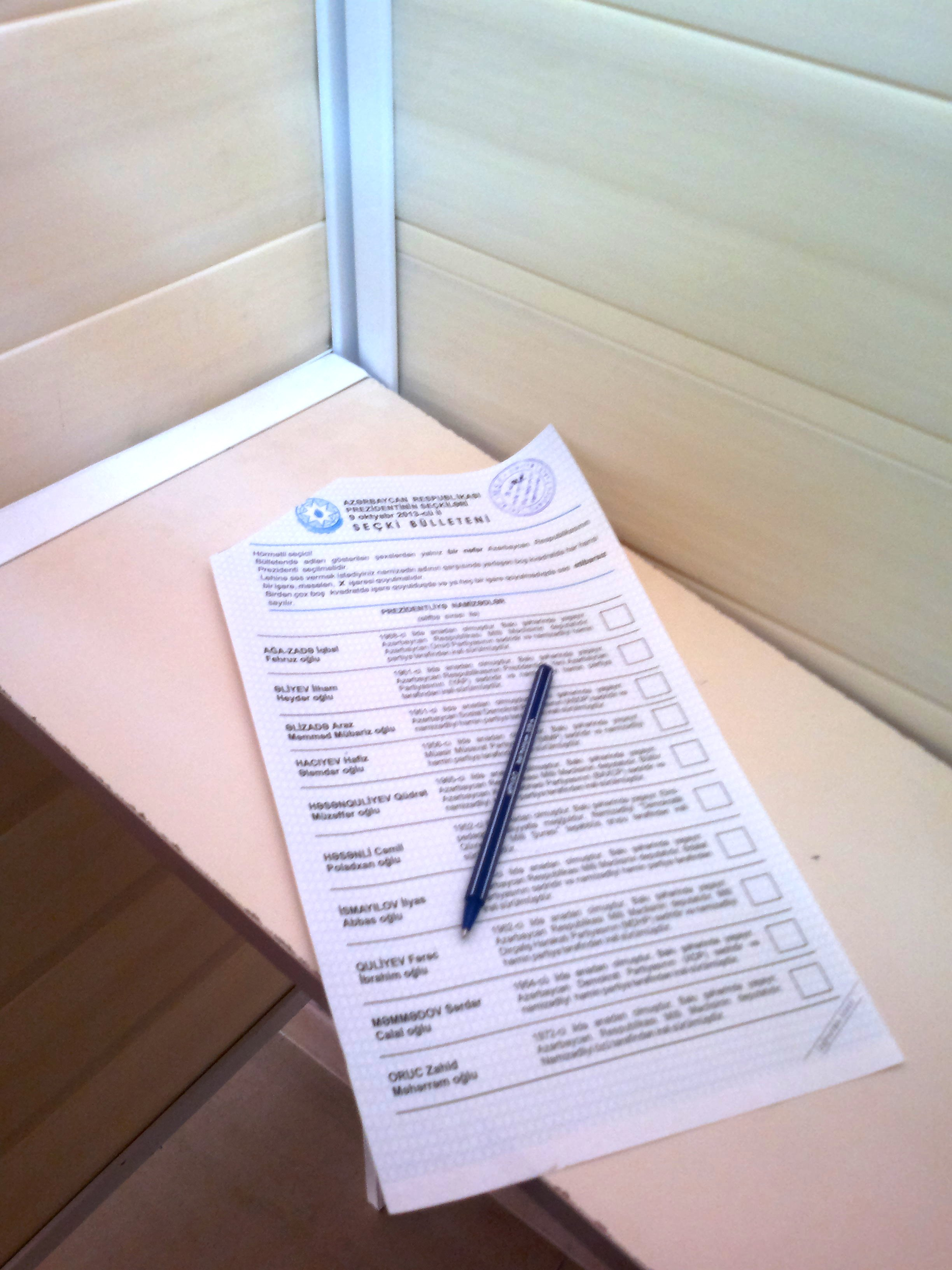
Bulletin for election in the voting cabin

On 7 June 2013 the New Azerbaijan Party nominated incumbent President Ilham Aliyev as their official presidential candidate. MP Mubariz Gurbanli announced that according to the Election Code of Azerbaijan Republic, the party had not only filled its signature requirements but could get more than the minimum 40,000 required signatures. He said: "The signature lists have been ready for already 4-5 days, but they can be submitted to the Central Election Commission (CEC) starting from 20 August, that is, 50 days before the elections under the legislation. So, our employees will submit the signature lists to CEC tomorrow. Under the law, the CEC will issue a document confirming the candidate’s participation in the elections after it reviews them."

In the meantime, playwright Rustam Ibragimbekov was chosen as the leader of the newly created National Council of Democratic Forces. The NCDF brought together main opposition forces, including Musavat, the Azerbaijani Popular Front Party, Open Society, Forum of Intellectuals. The alliance set as its main goal the "peaceful transition to democracy." Ibragimbekov was denied registration by the CEC because he "along with the citizenship of Azerbaijan, also of Russian citizenship and his commitment to the Russian Federation."

In late August, the united opposition picked historian Jamil Hasanli as its candidate. During the rally on 28 September 2013, Hasanli called on people to vote for him to "end the dictatorship of one family in Azerbaijan." A day before the election, main opposition candidate Jamil Hasanli stated that he is "running in this election with the paramount aim of ending 20 years of the Aliyev dynasty's misrule of my country, and restoring Azerbaijani democracy."

== Conduct ==
An official smartphone app run by the Central Election Commission (CEC) inadvertently released final election results a day before polls had opened. The results showed Ilham Aliyev having won with 72.76% of the recorded votes, while the nearest opposing candidate, Jamil Hasanli, tallied just 7.4%. The data was recalled, with an official claim that the app's developer had mistakenly tested the app with the 2008 election results, but the data released did not match the voter totals nor percentages of the previous election.

On 10 October 2013, Hasanli called for the results to be annulled due to alleged vote-rigging, claiming the elections were not free and fair because of electoral fraud and government control of all television channels.

== Results ==
Candidate	Party	Votes	%
Ilham Aliyev	New Azerbaijan Party	3,126,113	84.54
Jamil Hasanli	National Council of Democratic Forces	204,642	5.53
Igbal Aghazade	Party of Hope	88,723	2.40
Gudrat Gasanguliev	Whole Azerbaijan Popular Front Party	73,702	1.99
Zahid Oruj	Independent	53,839	1.46
Ilyas Ismayilov	Justice Party	39,722	1.07
Araz Alizadeh	Azerbaijani Social Democratic Party	32,069	0.87
Faraj Guliyev	National Revival Movement Party	31,926	0.86
Hafiz Hacıyev	Modern Equality Party	24,461	0.66
Sardar Jalaloglu	Azerbaijan Democratic Party	22,773	0.62
Total		3,697,970	100.00
Valid votes		3,697,970	99.02
Invalid/blank votes		36,622	0.98
Total votes		3,734,592	100.00
Registered voters/turnout		5,214,787	71.62
Source: CEC

== Reactions ==
International organizations

- Council of Europe — The Parliamentary Assembly of the Council of Europe short-term (4 days) delegation in the statement issued jointly with the European Parliament said that "overall around election day we have observed a free, fair and transparent electoral process." It did note, however, there was "[a lack of] respect [for] fundamental freedoms during the months before the election." and the election was "far from perfect."
- Organization for Security and Co-operation in Europe /Office for Democratic Institutions and Human Rights— The OSCE/ODIHR observation mission, which consisted of 13 Baku-based international experts and 30 long-term observers, criticized the electoral process in their conclusions saying that it "was undermined by limitations on the freedoms of expression, assembly, and association that did not guarantee a level playing field for candidates." The head of mission stated that their "observers received allegations of intimidation, witnessed even physical attacks on journalists in the lead up to an election day, which we found seriously flawed."
- European Union The Statement made by the EU High Representative and Security Policy Catherine Ashton and Commissioner Štefan Füle on Presidential elections in Azerbaijan stressed the results of the OSCE/ODIHR observation mission, "the OSCE/ODIHR's preliminary conclusions state that significant problems were observed throughout all stages of election day processes, and identify serious shortcomings"

States

- United States — The State Department said that the election "fell short of international standards." The statement, which aligned with the position of the OSCE/ODIHR, also named the procedural irregularities such as 1) ballot box stuffing; 2) serious problems with vote counting; and 3) failure to record the number of received ballots. "Leading up to election day, the Government of Azerbaijan also maintained a repressive political environment. Authorities interfered with the media and civil society routinely, sometimes violently interrupted peaceful rallies and meetings before and occasionally during the campaign period, and jailed a number of opposition and youth activists."
- France — Senator Thani Mohamed Soilihi, who observed the election, said that he does not "see any difference in the election processes of our countries [France and Azerbaijan]."
- Turkey — Turkish President Abdullah Gül and Prime Minister Recep Tayyip Erdoğan congratulated Ilham Aliyev on his election victory.
- Russia — Russian President Vladimir Putin congratulated Ilham Aliyev and called the election "fair and stable".

Azerbaijani officials have bashed those who criticizes their elections. The Chief of Presidential Administration of Azerbaijan Ramiz Mehdiyev, accused the US officials in recommending them to rig the elections to show that the incumbent President Ilham Aliyev was winning with 75% of the votes and to give 25% to the opposition candidate, to make it look believable.

=== International scandal ===
The controversial assessments by the Parliamentary Assembly of the Council of Europe/European Parliament and OSCE/ODIHR sparked a major scandal, as for the first time the reports of these authoritative European organizations openly contradicted one other. Further, many European experts and parliamentarians, among them also deputies of the European Parliament, harshly criticized the reports of the European Parliament and PACE as being biased. The Socialist Group in the European Parliament has distanced itself from the words of the observer mission EP / PACE, stating that the differences between the findings of the delegation of parliamentarians and the OSCE are so far away that it cannot be supported at all. The Greens/EFA Group of the European Parliament said that they do not endorse the statements made by the EP delegation. The Green foreign affairs spokesperson Werner Schulz said,

The shortcomings of EP's own election observation mission to Azerbaijan call into question the existence of such short-term missions in general... The European Parliament loses credibility with statements ignoring the reality of the situation in the country. A handful of MEPs are endangering the European Parliament's reputation in fighting for human rights, democracy and rule of law.

The European Stability Initiative (ESI) think tank has published a detailed report on observation missions participating in Azerbaijani elections 2013 titled "Disgraced: Azerbaijan and the end of election monitoring as we know it". The report, which was the third one of its kind on Azerbaijan issued by ESI, highlighted the drawbacks of international short-term observer missions, bringing up facts on that many election observers were either bribed by the Azerbaijani government or had some other vested interest in praising the fraudulent elections. Other attempts to investigate the sources of funding of the organizations that observed the elections in Azerbaijan, have proved to be futile, which further reinforced the suspicion that their "experts" were funded by Azerbaijan.

== Aftermath ==
On 12 October around 4,000 people protested against the election results. About ten protesters were arrested, while others were beaten.
