= Isgandarov =

Isgandarov is a surname. Notable people with the surname include:

- Adil Isgandarov (1910–1978), Soviet and Azerbaijani director
- Amiraslan Isgandarov (born 1976), Azerbaijani militant
- Anar Isgandarov, Azerbaijani historian
- Elshad Isgandarov (born 1972), Azerbaijani politician
- Fuad Isgandarov (born 1961), Azerbaijani diplomat
- Vidadi Isgandarov, Azerbaijani human rights activist
- Ulvi Isgandarov (born 1997), Azerbaijani footballer
