= 2010 Azerbaijani parliamentary election =

- 7 November 2010
- All 125 seats in the National Assembly; 63 seats needed for a majority
Party	Leader	Vote %	Seats	+/–
New Azerbaijan	Ilham Aliyev	46.48	71	+10
Civic Solidarity	Sabir Rustamkhanli	1.95	3	0
Motherland	Fazail Agamali	1.39	2	0
BAXCP	Gudrat Gasanguliev	1.03	1	0
Hope	İqbal Ağazadə	0.90	1	0
Social Prosperity	Xanhüseyn Kazımlı	0.76	1	0
Great Order	Fazil Mustafa	0.73	1	0
Justice	Ilyas Ismayilov	0.53	1	0
Civic Unity	Sabir Hacıyev	0.43	1	0
DİP	Asim Mollazadə	0.23	1	0
Affiliation unclear	–	1.70	3	
Independents	–	35.6	39	−4
This lists parties that won seats. See the complete results below.
Speaker before	Speaker after
Ogtay Asadov	Ogtay Asadov

Parliamentary elections were held in Azerbaijan on 7 November 2010.

== Candidates ==
The registration of candidates ended on 15 October. Although 1,115 candidates filed application to run in the election, only 690 were given the go ahead by the electoral commission.

== Conduct ==
The elections were observed by monitors from the European Parliament, Organization for Security and Co-operation in Europe (OSCE) and the Council of Europe. The OSCE stated that the election campaign had been marred by restrictions on media freedom and freedom of assembly. Many opposition candidates were unable to register themselves, thus creating an "uneven playing field", according to the OSCE. The pre-election atmosphere was tense with the media complaining of pressure and intransparent financial transactions of state officials.

The observation mission of the PACE reported that "the whole election process showed progress in reaching Assembly and OSCE standards and commitments" but that "significant progress would still be necessary to reach an overall electoral and democratic consensus".

Many national and foreign experts found no major improvement in the conduct of these elections. No elections after 1992 were fully in accordance with national and international democratic standards. So far Azerbaijan has been convicted twice of election fraud during the 2005 parliamentary elections by the European Court of Human Rights in Strasbourg. In April it was regarding Nemat Aliyev's case, and in September regarding Flora Karimova's.

Prior to the elections, the government amended visa regulations, making it more difficult for election observers and journalists to enter the country.

== Results ==
President Ilham Aliyev's ruling Yeni Azerbaijan Party got a majority of 71 out of 125 seats. Nominally independent candidates, who were aligned with the government, received 38 seats, and 10 small opposition or quasi-opposition parties got the remaining 13 seats. Civic Solidarity retained its 3 seats, and Ana Vaten kept the 2 seats they had in the previous legislature; the Democratic Reforms party, Great Creation, the Movement for National Rebirth, Umid, Civic Unity, Civic Welfare, Adalet (Justice), and the Popular Front of United Azerbaijan, most of which were represented in the previous parliament, won one seat apiece.

For the first time in Azerbaijani history, not a single candidate from the main opposition Azerbaijan Popular Front (AXCP) or Musavat parties was elected. The opposition Musavat decried the election as "illegitimate...[the] events had nothing to do with elections, it was the most shameful kind of election." Ruling president, Aliyev, however, said the election was fair.

Party	Votes	%	Seats	+/–
New Azerbaijan Party	1,110,885	46.48	71	+10
Musavat	47,942	2.01	0	–5
Civic Solidarity Party	46,512	1.95	3	0
Motherland Party	33,275	1.39	2	0
Classic Popular Front Party	31,317	1.31	0	–
Azerbaijani Popular Front Party	28,719	1.20	0	–1
Whole Azerbaijan Popular Front Party	24,499	1.03	1	0
Azerbaijan National Independence Party	23,141	0.97	0	–
Azerbaijan Hope Party	21,605	0.90	1	0
Azerbaijan Social Prosperity Party	18,073	0.76	1	0
Great Order Party	17,389	0.73	1	0
Justice Party	12,761	0.53	1	0
Citizen and Development Party	11,170	0.47	0	–
Democratic Azerbaijan World Party	11,110	0.46	0	–
Civic Unity Party	10,169	0.43	1	0
Azerbaijan Democratic Party	7,662	0.32	0	0
Azerbaijan Communist Party	6,942	0.29	0	–
Intellectuals Party	5,647	0.24	0	–
Democratic Reforms Party	5,555	0.23	1	0
Azerbaijani Social Democratic Party	4,402	0.18	0	–
Azerbaijan People's Party	3,670	0.15	0	–
Azerbaijan Progress Party	3,642	0.15	0	–
Modern Equality Party	3,349	0.14	0	–
Azerbaijan Liberal Party	2,224	0.09	0	–
Unity Party	2,186	0.09	0	–
Azerbaijan National Democrat Party	1,209	0.05	0	–
Freedom Party	1,088	0.05	0	–
Azerbaijan Free Republicans Party	820	0.03	0	–
Great Azerbaijan Party	750	0.03	0	–
Azerbaijan Evolution Party	306	0.01	0	–
Azerbaijan National Statehood Party	104	0.00	0	–
National Salvation Party	94	0.00	0	–
Azerbaijan Democratic Enlightenment Party	55	0.00	0	–
Independents	850,870	35.60	39	–4
Affiliation not indicated	40,688	1.70	3	0
Total	2,389,830	100.00	125	0
Registered voters/turnout	4,922,600	–		
Source: MSK, Election Passport

== Reactions ==
Western observers and the opposition alleged irregularities. The elections were observed by monitors from the European Parliament, Organization for Security and Co-operation in Europe (OSCE) and the Council of Europe. The OSCE reported that on election day there were cases of ballot-stuffing.
