= Vidadi =

Vidadi is an Azerbaijani name that may refer to:

- Vidadi Babanli (1927–2025), Azerbaijani writer, dramatist and translator
- Vidadi Isgandarov , Azerbaijani human rights activist and politician
- Vidadi Muradov (1956–2021), Azerbaijani economist
- Vidadi Narimanbekov (1926–2001), Azerbaijani painter
- Vidadi Rzayev (born 1967), Azerbaijani football midfielder
- Molla Vali Vidadi (1708–1809), Azerbaijani poet
