= Free Homeland Party =

Free Homeland Party may refer to:

- Free Homeland Party, a political party in Azerbaijan
- Partido Patria Libre, a political party in Paraguay
- Partido Pátria Livre, a political party in Brazil
