= Unity Party (Azerbaijan) =

Azerbaijani political party

Unity Party Vəhdət Partiyası
- Abbreviation: VP
- Chairman: Tahir Kərimli
- Vice Chairman: Əbdülvahab Manafov; Vasif Əfəndiyev
- Founder: Tahir Kərimli
- Founded: 1994
- Registered: 11 December 1998
- Split from: Azerbaijani Popular Front Party
- Headquarters: B.Səfəroglu, 28, Baku
- Membership: 1,000
- Ideology: Political unionism (Restoration of territorial integrity with fair resolution of Nagorno-Karabakh Conflict)
- Anthem: Koroghlu opera
- National Assembly: 1 / 125

Website
- Facebook page

The Unity Party (Azerbaijani: Vəhdət Partiyası, VP) is a political party in Azerbaijan led by Tahir Kərimli. It supports a resolution to the Nagorno-Karabakh conflict that restores the pre-conflict territorial boundaries of Azerbaijan.

== History ==
The party was established in 1995. In April 2000 a breakaway led to the formation of the Unity Party II, which later merged into the Azerbaijani Popular Front Party. It supported Ilham Aliyev of the New Azerbaijan Party in the 2008 presidential elections.

In the 2015 parliamentary elections the party won a single seat, with Kərimli elected in the Ağsu-İsmayilli constituency.

== Election results ==
=== National Assembly elections ===
| Election | Leader | Votes | % | Seats | +/– | Position | Government |
|---|---|---|---|---|---|---|---|
| 2010 | Tahir Kerimli | 2,186 | 0.09 | 0 / 125 | New | ▼25th | Extra-parliamentary |
| 2015 | Tahir Kerimli | 15,070 | 0.53 | 1 / 125 | ▲1 | ▼9th | Opposition |
| 2020 | Tahir Kerimli | 11,347 | 0.49 | 0 / 125 | 0 | ▲8th | Opposition |
| 2024 | Tahir Kerimli | 3,159 | 0.13 | 0 / 125 | ▼1 | ▼18th | Extra-parliamentary |
