= Amiraslan =

Amiraslan is a given name. Notable people with the name include:

- Amiraslan Aliyev (1960–1995), National Hero of Azerbaijan
- Amiraslan Isgandarov (born 1976), Azerbaijani militant
