= Temnikov (disambiguation) =

Temnikov is a town in the Republic of Mordovia, Russia.

Temnikov (masculine) or Temnikova (feminine) may also refer to:

- Elena Temnikova (born 1985), Russian singer
- Gennady Temnikov, winner of the 2001 Philadelphia Marathon
- Ivan Temnikov (born 1989), Russian soccer player
- Maria Temnikova (born 1995), Russian swimmer
- Roman Temnikov, member of the Central Revision Committee of the Party for Democratic Reforms (Azerbaijan)
