= 2024 Azerbaijani parliamentary election =

- 1 September 2024
- All 125 seats in the National Assembly; 63 seats needed for a majority
Party	Leader	Vote %	Seats	+/–
New Azerbaijan	Ilham Aliyev	50.42	68	−2
Civic Solidarity	Sabir Rustamkhanli	1.42	3	0
ƏHD	Gudrat Gasanguliev	1.35	2	+1
REAL	Ilgar Mammadov	0.76	1	New
BAP	Elşad Musayev	0.61	1	+1
Motherland	Fazail Agamali	0.61	1	0
AMİP	Etibar Mammadov	0.59	1	+1
National Front	Razi Nurullayev	0.49	1	New
DİP	Asim Mollazadə	0.45	1	0
ADMP	Elşən Musayev	0.44	1	0
Great Order	Fazil Mustafa	0.36	1	0
Independents	–	39.35	44	+3
This lists parties that won seats. See the complete results below.
Speaker before	Speaker after
Sahiba Gafarova; New Azerbaijan	Sahiba Gafarova; New Azerbaijan

Parliamentary elections were held in Azerbaijan on 1 September 2024. They were originally scheduled to take place in November 2024, but were brought forward after parliament was dissolved in June 2024. The New Azerbaijan Party of President Ilham Aliyev won a majority of 68 seats in the 125-seat National Assembly.

Campaigning was minimal, the leading opposition Azerbaijani Popular Front Party did not take part and the election was criticized for being undemocratic.

== Background ==
The elections were originally scheduled to take place in November 2024. However, in late June 2024 MPs asked President Ilham Aliyev to dissolve the National Assembly and call elections in September to avoid holding them during the 2024 United Nations Climate Change Conference to be hosted in Baku from 11 to 22 November. Despite criticism from opposition parties, the measure was approved by the Constitutional Court on 27 June, which allowed Aliyev to dissolve parliament on 28 June and set 1 September as the date for the elections. Previous elections since independence had not been regarded as fully free or fair, and the vote for the Milli Mejlis was not expected to bring significant changes to the body. Going into the election, the ruling New Azerbaijan party held 69 seats.

These were the first elections since Azerbaijan regained the Armenian separatist state of Nagorno-Karabakh, after launching an offensive in September 2023.

The leading opposition Azerbaijan Popular Front Party did not take part in the election, for the seventh straight time.

== Electoral system ==
The 125 members of the National Assembly are elected in single-member constituencies using the first-past-the-post system. More than 6.4 million people registered to vote in the election. Voting began at 08:00 and closed at 19:00. The election also marked the first time that voting was held in Nagorno-Karabakh since 1994, following it being taken back by Azerbaijani forces in 2023.

== Candidates ==
The opposition Musavat party initially fielded 34 candidates for the election, of which only 25 were registered to appear in the balloting. The Republican Alternative Party fielded 12 candidates.

== Conduct ==
Fifty organisations sent observers to monitor the election, including the OSCE.

== Results ==
Results showed the ruling New Azerbaijan Party of President Aliyev securing a narrow majority of 68 of 125 seats in the National Assembly. Forty-four seats were won by independents, while the remaining seats were won by smaller parties. Official turnout was at 37.3%.

Party	Votes	%	Seats	+/–
New Azerbaijan Party	1,200,314	50.42	68	–2
Civic Solidarity Party	33,722	1.42	3	0
Justice, Law, Democracy Party	32,220	1.35	2	+1
Republican Alternative Party	17,993	0.76	1	New
Musavat	15,278	0.64	0	0
Great Azerbaijan Party	14,636	0.61	1	+1
Motherland Party	14,466	0.61	1	0
Azerbaijan National Independence Party	13,961	0.59	1	+1
White Party	13,564	0.57	0	0
Azerbaijan Hope Party	12,858	0.54	0	0
National Front Party	11,554	0.49	1	New
Democratic Reforms Party	10,698	0.45	1	0
Azerbaijan Democratic Enlightenment Party	10,432	0.44	1	0
Great Order Party	8,651	0.36	1	0
Classic People's Front Party	7,466	0.31	0	New
Azerbaijan People's Party	5,351	0.22	0	0
Free Homeland Party	4,886	0.21	0	New
Unity Party	3,159	0.13	0	–1
Right Justice Party	2,833	0.12	0	New
Modern Musavat Party	2,599	0.11	0	0
Justice Party	2,323	0.10	0	0
New Time Party	2,031	0.09	0	New
Azerbaijan Democrat Party	2,013	0.08	0	0
Future Azerbaijan Party	694	0.03	0	New
National Revival Movement Party	178	0.01	0	0
Independents	936,915	39.35	44	+3
Total	2,380,795	100.00	125	0
Valid votes	2,380,795	99.55		
Invalid/blank votes	10,743	0.45		
Total votes	2,391,538	100.00		
Registered voters/turnout	6,421,960	37.24		
Source: MSK

=== By constituency ===
Results by constituency
Constituency	Candidate	Party	Votes
District Nº1	Ziyafət Abbas Əsgərov	New Azerbaijan Party	13,591
District Nº1	Fikrət Binnət Məmmədov	Independent	2,366
District Nº1	Şixəli Qəzənfər Şixəliyev	Independent	1,125
District Nº1	Nazəni Zöhür Quliyeva	Independent	1,057
District Nº1	Şahnaz Fizuli Mehdiyeva	Independent	1,022
District Nº1	Kifayət Həsən Həsənova	Independent	887
District Nº2	Siyavuş Dünyamali Novruzov	New Azerbaijan Party	14,036
District Nº2	Nurlan Məmməd Vəliyev	Independent	1,563
District Nº2	Əhməd Vəli Təhməzov	Independent	871
District Nº2	Fizuli Qurban Əsgərov	Azerbaijan Hope Party	830
District Nº2	Vüqar Hüseyn Nəcəfov	New Azerbaijan Party	751
District Nº2	Amar Dağbəyi Hüseyn	Independent	658
District Nº2	Mahmud Tarverdi Şahhüseynov	Independent	650
District Nº2	Fərdi Tahir Cəlilov	Independent	571
District Nº2	Mirhadi Mirfətulla Seyidov	Independent	537
District Nº2	Nəzirə Ismayil Əliyeva	Independent	403
District Nº2	Lalə Səfər Əmirquliyeva	Independent	296
District Nº3	Səttar Suliddin Möhbaliyev	Independent	10,001
District Nº3	Asiman Əli Babayev	New Azerbaijan Party	6,056
District Nº3	Nurşən Elbəyi Quliyeva	Independent	500
District Nº3	Anar Məmməd Hüseynov	Independent	466
District Nº3	Gülzar Nadir Rüstəmova	Independent	281
District Nº3	Aynişan Ilyas Səfərova	Independent	226
District Nº3	Famil Abbasqulu Abbasquliyev	Independent	208
District Nº3	Emin Məhərrəm Muradov	Independent	184
District Nº4	Eldar Rza Ibrahimov	New Azerbaijan Party	11,908
District Nº4	Vəfa Əsgər Ismayilova	Independent	1,808
District Nº4	Gülmira Sahib Əsədova	Independent	1,098
District Nº4	Vüsalə Ramiz Məmmədova	Independent	902
District Nº4	Günay Əziz Novruzova	Independent	787
District Nº4	Ayaz Zöhrab Seyidli	Independent	575
District Nº4	Süleyman Vüqar Mirzəyev	Independent	322
District Nº5	Ülviyyə Tapdiq Həmzəyeva	New Azerbaijan Party	9,638
District Nº5	Səfər Cəfərəli Əlirzayev	New Azerbaijan Party	3,719
District Nº5	Ruqiyyə Nurəddin Məmmədova	Independent	731
District Nº5	Hicran Həsən Həsənov	Independent	690
District Nº5	Günel Samir Novruzlu	Independent	507
District Nº5	Adil Mehdi Mehdiyev	Independent	376
District Nº5	Nazim Bayram Xudiyev	Independent	359
District Nº5	Orxan Əyyub Ismayilov	Independent	311
District Nº5	Əli Cəfər Məmmədov	Independent	311
District Nº5	Adil Həsən Ibrahimov	Independent	249
District Nº6	Vüqar Gəncəli Rəhimzadə	New Azerbaijan Party	11,043
District Nº6	Yunis Faiq Hüseynov	Independent	2,040
District Nº6	Elnur Ilqar Əsgərov	Independent	854
District Nº6	Mətləb Məhərrəm Aslanov	White Party	839
District Nº6	Mahmud Elçin Abdullayev	Independent	619
District Nº6	Aysel Əlixan Məmmədli	Independent	610
District Nº6	Vəli Adil Hüseynov	Independent	448
District Nº7	Nigar Cavid Arpadarai	Independent	10,880
District Nº7	Əhliman Paşa Qarayev	New Azerbaijan Party	6,368
District Nº7	Xatun Zaur Kərimova	Independent	742
District Nº7	Aydan Kamran Axundova	Independent	534
District Nº7	Elvin Sucəddin Novruzov	Independent	322
District Nº7	Elçin Şəmil Muxtarov	Independent	80
District Nº7	Elxan Şərif Əfəndiyev	Independent	31
District Nº7	Sahib Allahyar Əlibalayev	Independent	22
District Nº8	Azay Əjdər Quliyev	Independent	9,390
District Nº8	Həcər Niyazi Mirzəyeva	New Azerbaijan Party	4,063
District Nº8	Ilkin Oruc Rəhimov	Independent	755
District Nº8	Sənan Rafiq Daşdəmirli	National Front Party	463
District Nº8	Tamilla Famil Qulami	Azerbaijan Hope Party	452
District Nº8	Mustafa Mustafa Hacili	Musavat	371
District Nº8	Ağasif Şakir Ibrahimov	Future Azerbaijan Party	360
District Nº8	Aydin Adil Cabbarli	Independent	344
District Nº8	Rəşid Ərşad Əliyev	Classic People's Front Party	217
District Nº8	Elməddin Süleyman Salmanli	Independent	209
District Nº8	Mehrac Mahir Sarixanli	Independent	160
District Nº9	Kamaləddin Nəsrəddin Qafarov	New Azerbaijan Party	16,311
District Nº9	Elmira Raquf Fərzəliyeva	Independent	2,060
District Nº9	Əli Məhəmməd Orucov	Azerbaijan National Independence Party	1,457
District Nº9	Səfər Xəlil Alişarli	Independent	603
District Nº9	Mahir Rasim Qədirov	Independent	496
District Nº9	Nobil Saleh Mənsimov	Independent	455
District Nº9	Samir Əkbər Rəsulov	Independent	407
District Nº9	Toğrul Mahir Süleymanov	Independent	400
District Nº10	Elşad Nəbi Musayev	Great Azerbaijan Party	11,576
District Nº10	Hümbət Rəhim Hüseynov	New Azerbaijan Party	5,396
District Nº10	Elnur Malik Isayev	Independent	683
District Nº10	Leyla Abbasəli Mədətova	Independent	445
District Nº10	Əhmədağa Səlim Eyyubov	Democratic Reforms Party	409
District Nº10	Razim Malikəjdər Əmiraslanli	Musavat	396
District Nº10	Rəşad Nürəddin Məmmədov	New Time Party	341
District Nº10	Aydan Ilqar Nəsibova	Independent	322
District Nº10	Zaur Əli Hüseynov	Independent	315
District Nº10	Kübra Rasim Hüseynova	Independent	234
District Nº10	Məhəmməd Vidadi Əsədullazadə	National Front Party	202
District Nº11	Səbinə Səməd Xasayeva	New Azerbaijan Party	15,159
District Nº11	Behbud Yaşar Məmmədzadə	Independent	1,235
District Nº11	Minəxanim Abdulla Allahverdiyeva	Independent	905
District Nº11	Vüsal Mübariz Qurbanli	Independent	700
District Nº11	Günel Namizəd Həsənova	Independent	644
District Nº11	Tural Əkbər Cəfərov	Independent	633
District Nº11	Nicat Müseyib Abbasov	Independent	583
District Nº11	Murad Valeh Alişov	National Front Party	513
District Nº11	Fəxrəddin Məhəddin Mehdiyev	Independent	478
District Nº11	Əli Zülfüqar Ibrahimov	Justice, Law, Democracy Party	467
District Nº11	Telman Nəsimi Ələsgərov	Civic Solidarity Party	457
District Nº11	Emil Fazil Yusubov	Modern Musavat Party	386
District Nº12	Soltan Teymur Məmmədov	Independent	7,684
District Nº12	Pərvanə Əlövsəd Piriyeva	New Azerbaijan Party	6,176
District Nº12	Əlikram Haciağa Əliyev	Independent	455
District Nº12	Almaz Əli Məmmədova	Musavat	138
District Nº12	Əli Məmməd Əliyev	Independent	128
District Nº12	Faiq Baba Əli Səlimov	Independent	127
District Nº12	Tural Elmar Qasimov	Independent	122
District Nº12	Günay Əlövsət Ibazadə	Independent	105
District Nº12	Fərhad Quli Nəcəfov	Independent	67
District Nº12	Tamara Zöhrab Dəmirova	Independent	39
District Nº12	Leyla Rafiq Ballayeva	Independent	20
District Nº12	Ilkin Eldar Fərəcov	Independent	18
District Nº12	Saniyə Məhəmməd Şahverənova	Independent	17
District Nº13	Gülşən Məmmədəli Paşayeva	Independent	8,632
District Nº13	Cəlahir Mirzəbala Əliyev	New Azerbaijan Party	6,822
District Nº13	Şükür Ilqar Cavadov	Azerbaijan Hope Party	346
District Nº13	Mirəzim Həsən Zaidov	National Front Party	336
District Nº13	Imaməli Imanverdi Imanov	Independent	317
District Nº13	Əhəd Fərhad Məmmədli	White Party	308
District Nº13	Aysel Təfşir Quliyeva	Independent	291
District Nº13	Vüsal Xanlar Poladov	Independent	268
District Nº13	Turan Aydin Həsənova	Independent	264
District Nº13	Samirə Sabir Muradova	Independent	216
District Nº14	Günay Elçin Əfəndiyeva	Independent	8,485
District Nº14	Vüsalə Elman Rəsulova	New Azerbaijan Party	6,812
District Nº14	Gülşən Camal Qasimli	Independent	522
District Nº14	Aynur Mirzağa Səfərova	Independent	460
District Nº14	Mehriban Rövşən Buniyatova	Independent	314
District Nº14	Qumru Ağaddin Əliyeva	Independent	284
District Nº14	Ağababa Mirzəməmməd Əzməmmədov	Independent	277
District Nº15	Ülvi Zahid Quliyev	Independent	6,859
District Nº15	Vüqar Əli Ələkbərov	Independent	2,091
District Nº15	Əli Dilən Quliyev	New Azerbaijan Party	1,238
District Nº15	Yusif Kamil Seyfəlov	Independent	823
District Nº15	Vüsalə Valeh Dadaşova	Justice Party	570
District Nº15	Turan Hüseyn Hüseynova	Independent	236
District Nº15	Taleh Məhəmməd Əliyev	Azerbaijan Hope Party	150
District Nº15	Emil Vaqif Məmmədov	Independent	147
District Nº15	Elcan Vəliməmməd Məmmədli	Independent	141
District Nº15	Ərturqut Nəsimi Şərəfxanli	Civic Solidarity Party	110
District Nº16	Erkin Toğrul Qədirli	Republican Alternative Party	6,829
District Nº16	Həbib Adil Mirzəyev	New Azerbaijan Party	2,651
District Nº16	Mehriban Əli Abdullayeva	Independent	1,493
District Nº16	Altay Qadir Abiyev	Independent	685
District Nº16	Lalə Gülbaba Abbasova	Independent	618
District Nº16	Gülpəri Azər Bayramova	Independent	487
District Nº16	Fuad Əhmədxan Əlifxanov	Independent	428
District Nº16	Elşən Mansur Mustafayev	Azerbaijan National Independence Party	368
District Nº16	Leyla Elman Orucova	Independent	337
District Nº17	Göydəniz Ibrahim Qəhrəmanov	Independent	12,165
District Nº17	Zaman Rəşid Məmmədov	New Azerbaijan Party	2,260
District Nº17	Aydin Əhməd Əbilov	Independent	586
District Nº17	Ruhiyyə Ələsgər Bayramova	Independent	512
District Nº17	Ceyhun Fərhad Əsgərov	Independent	404
District Nº17	Nüşabə Ağabala Sadixli	Musavat	358
District Nº17	Turanə Mustafa Nəsibova	Independent	246
District Nº17	Yalçin Akif Hacizadə	Motherland Party	244
District Nº17	Mütəllim Qara Rəhimov	Justice Party	137
District Nº18	Rasim Nəsrəddin Musabəyov	Independent	11,869
District Nº18	Nizami Babaş Babaşov	New Azerbaijan Party	7,694
District Nº18	Rövşən Asəf Tağiyev	Independent	1,239
District Nº18	Xanlar Nüsrət Abbasov	Azerbaijan Hope Party	708
District Nº18	Eldar Elxan Əliyev	Independent	587
District Nº18	Hüseyn Alixan Süleymanov	Independent	564
District Nº18	Türkan Şakir Həsənova	Independent	484
District Nº18	Tural Sahib Məmmədzadə	Independent	374
District Nº18	Azər Bilal Ələkbərov	Independent	247
District Nº19	Hikmət Baba Məmmədov	New Azerbaijan Party	11,913
District Nº19	Azər Arif Məmmədli	Independent	1,036
District Nº19	Mahir Həmzə Zeynalov	Justice, Law, Democracy Party	975
District Nº19	Aliyə Tariyel Məmmədova	Independent	962
District Nº19	Lalə Qəzənfər Əlimirzəyeva	Motherland Party	946
District Nº19	Adil Eynali Mikayilli	Classic People's Front Party	703
District Nº20	Samir Əhməd Vəliyev	New Azerbaijan Party	10,495
District Nº20	Lalə Eynulla Qüdrətli	Independent	2,049
District Nº20	Emin Arif Şirinov	Independent	1,037
District Nº20	Rahib Qədir Yusifli	Independent	795
District Nº20	Fuad Əkrəm Bədəlov	White Party	763
District Nº20	Orxan Akif Nəbiyev	Democratic Reforms Party	678
District Nº20	Zaur Çingiz Ağayev	Independent	623
District Nº20	Bədihə Rasim Nəbizadə	Independent	478
District Nº21	Məlahət Ibrahim Ibrahimqizi	New Azerbaijan Party	5,822
District Nº21	Tural Feyruz Abbasli	White Party	2,536
District Nº21	Ələsgər Hüseyn Vəliyev	Independent	330
District Nº21	Gülağa Qulam Aslanli	Musavat	280
District Nº21	Minarə Həsən Həsənova	Independent	254
District Nº21	Fazil Islam Sadiqov	Independent	132
District Nº21	Reyhan Yunus Ismayilova	Independent	119
District Nº22	Asim Nazim Mollazadə	Democratic Reforms Party	8,180
District Nº22	Xaliq Isa Hüseynov	New Azerbaijan Party	3,024
District Nº22	Cahandar Cahangir Ismayilov	Independent	947
District Nº22	Ilqar Eldar Məmmədov	Republican Alternative Party	933
District Nº22	Xəyalə Bayram Əhmədova	Independent	329
District Nº22	Ilham Müslüm Ağayev	Independent	307
District Nº22	Ədviyə Ədalət Rəsullu	Independent	213
District Nº22	Ramil Rəsul Şirinov	Free Homeland Party	167
District Nº23	Ziyad Əliabbas Səmədzadə	Independent	8,078
District Nº23	Elnur Fidail Rəhimov	New Azerbaijan Party	4,735
District Nº23	Elçin Tofiq Əliyev	Republican Alternative Party	752
District Nº23	Eldar Ismayil Ismayilov	Independent	434
District Nº23	Elza Nuru Qasimova	Independent	363
District Nº23	Nigar Natiq Babayeva	Independent	301
District Nº23	Əvəz Bəbirxan Temirxan	Independent	293
District Nº23	Araz Mahir Teymurov	White Party	268
District Nº23	Əziz Fatehoviç Əzizov	Independent	189
District Nº23	Əlisahib Qiyas Israfilzadə	Independent	128
District Nº24	Könül Oruc Nurullayeva	Independent	7,309
District Nº24	Ramil Şahsuvar Rüstəmov	New Azerbaijan Party	4,318
District Nº24	Gülnar Ibadət Nuriyeva	Independent	1,805
District Nº24	Əyyub Zöhrab Kərimli	Independent	514
District Nº24	Ülviyyə Məmməd Şükürova	Independent	500
District Nº24	Elmar Rəhim Haciyev	Independent	312
District Nº24	Aynur Vaqif Zülfüqarova	Independent	267
District Nº24	Əliyar Əliş Şirməmmədov	Right Justice Party	234
District Nº25	Əli Cavad Əhmədov	New Azerbaijan Party	13,407
District Nº25	Təranə Bayraməli Hüseynova	Independent	2,168
District Nº25	Nərgiz Ağasadiq Qasimova	Independent	1,270
District Nº25	Vasif Buludxan Ismayilov	Independent	491
District Nº25	Rauf Islam Heydərov	Independent	462
District Nº25	Bəhram Məmməd Mehdiyev	Right Justice Party	274
District Nº25	Elməddin Cəfərqulu Qulubəyli	Independent	242
District Nº26	Fazil Qəzənfər Mustafa	Great Order Party	8,651
District Nº26	Afaq Şirzad Haciyeva	New Azerbaijan Party	6,956
District Nº26	Xalid Əli Bağirov	Independent	427
District Nº26	Anar Arzu Qocali	Independent	417
District Nº26	Telman Adigözəl Kərimzadə	Independent	328
District Nº26	Sabir Faiq Ağayev	Civic Solidarity Party	294
District Nº26	Nizami Həsən Məmmədov	Independent	208
District Nº26	Fatimə Fərhad Həbibova	Independent	196
District Nº27	Arzuxan Baxşəli Əli-Zadə	Azerbaijan National Independence Party	7,114
District Nº27	Səbinə Məmmədağa Qasimova	New Azerbaijan Party	6,329
District Nº27	Gülşən Əbil Aslanova	Independent	687
District Nº27	Şəhriyar Əlfəddin Həsənli	Independent	638
District Nº27	Ibrahim Azər Muradov	Independent	556
District Nº27	Nuranə Kamil Baxtiyarova	Independent	425
District Nº27	Əliseyran Tahir Babayev	Independent	360
District Nº27	Elnarə Sabir Atakişiyeva	Independent	244
District Nº28	Eldar Allahyar Quliyev	Independent	6,686
District Nº28	Taleh Mərifət Qurbanov	New Azerbaijan Party	5,544
District Nº28	Aslan Fazil Həmidli	Future Azerbaijan Party	334
District Nº28	Əli Ilham Iskəndərov	Independent	307
District Nº28	Şərqiyyə Rafiq Rzayeva	Democratic Reforms Party	307
District Nº28	Mehriban Azad Kərimova	Independent	265
District Nº28	Ramilə Əsəd Hüseynova	Independent	250
District Nº28	Ləman Mənsur Əsgərli	Independent	237
District Nº29	Azər Kərim Allahverənov	Independent	7,774
District Nº29	Ilahə Intiqam Abdullazadə	New Azerbaijan Party	6,449
District Nº29	Nicat Zaur Əliyev	Independent	1,255
District Nº29	Aygül Azər Babayeva	Independent	826
District Nº29	Şahin Yusif Muradov	Independent	413
District Nº29	Ercan Asəf Abdullazadə	Independent	275
District Nº29	Tamerlan Nəbi Yaqubov	Independent	206
District Nº30	Sevinc Həbib Fətəliyeva	New Azerbaijan Party	9,451
District Nº30	Xəyyam Elburus Xəlilov	Independent	1,956
District Nº30	Yaşar Əli Abbasov	Independent	1,184
District Nº30	Rəqsanə Famil Tağiyeva	Independent	966
District Nº30	Imran Kamal Mehdiyev	Independent	892
District Nº30	Racəddin Həşim Babayev	White Party	484
District Nº30	Ilahə Artur Sadiqova	Azerbaijan Hope Party	390
District Nº31	Qaya Məmməd Məmmədov	Independent	8,269
District Nº31	Etibar Əliağa Quliyev	New Azerbaijan Party	4,827
District Nº31	Şamil Ənvər Tağiyev	Independent	841
District Nº31	Vüqar Cavad Qasimov	Great Azerbaijan Party	699
District Nº31	Mahmud Avdi Mahmudov	Republican Alternative Party	533
District Nº31	Ərzulla Əşrəf Bulud	Musavat	471
District Nº31	Aytən Tural Sərdarli	Independent	319
District Nº31	Həbib Müzəffər Ələkbərov	National Revival Movement Party	178
District Nº32	Afət Əbil Həsənova	New Azerbaijan Party	11,697
District Nº32	Yeganə Bilal Mirzəyeva	Independent	2,529
District Nº32	Anar Əlisəfa Əlisəfazadə	Independent	1,345
District Nº32	Əfqan Bəhlul Quliyev	Independent	689
District Nº32	Cavad Səlim Səlimov	Independent	471
District Nº32	Ülviyyə Cahandar Şixiyeva	National Front Party	283
District Nº32	Ilqar May Quliyev	Musavat	216
District Nº33	Zahid Məhərrəm Oruc	Independent	4,886
District Nº33	Namus Haci Atakişiyev	Independent	1,025
District Nº33	Fuad Malik Abbasov	Independent	969
District Nº33	Yengibar Sərraf Əliyev	New Azerbaijan Party	445
District Nº33	Natiq Mehman Cəfərov	Republican Alternative Party	419
District Nº33	Gülnar Fərmayil Xəlilova	New Azerbaijan Party	346
District Nº33	Aysel Xanlar Səfərli	Civic Solidarity Party	124
District Nº33	Elnurə Oqtay Nemətova	Independent	92
District Nº33	Kamran Fərhad Məmmədli	White Party	50
District Nº33	Arif Məmməd Əliyev	Independent	37
District Nº33	Xaliddin Baloğlan Cahangirov	Azerbaijan Democrat Party	36
District Nº34	Mixail Yuryeviç Zabelin	New Azerbaijan Party	12,421
District Nº34	Nicat Ərrəhman Qasimzadə	Independent	1,296
District Nº34	Zakir Hüseyn Hüseynov	Azerbaijan Democrat Party	1,281
District Nº34	Fikrət Ilyas Cəfərov	Great Azerbaijan Party	1,275
District Nº34	Vəsilə Cümşüd Haciyeva	Independent	669
District Nº34	Hüseyin Namik Hüseyinov	Independent	585
District Nº34	Şahlar Əhməd Haciyev	Independent	493
District Nº34	Türkay Mirfaiq Mirheydərli	Independent	191
District Nº35	Pərvanə Bulut Vəliyeva	New Azerbaijan Party	15,273
District Nº35	Vüsalə Musa Əliyeva	Independent	2,077
District Nº35	Bəybala Əşrəf Əliyev	Azerbaijan Hope Party	683
District Nº35	Elnur Ramizoviç Vahabov	Independent	671
District Nº35	Tural Comərd Hüseynzadə	Civic Solidarity Party	592
District Nº35	Tofiq Kamil Hətəmov	Independent	589
District Nº35	Etibar Elmar Sayadli	Independent	571
District Nº35	Qasim Rəhim Həsənov	Azerbaijan Hope Party	518
District Nº36	Qüdrət Müzəffər Həsənquliyev	Justice, Law, Democracy Party	9,055
District Nº36	Nərminə Aslan Haciyeva	New Azerbaijan Party	5,402
District Nº36	Vəkil Bağman Piriyev	Independent	789
District Nº36	Şakir Musa Eyyubov	Independent	750
District Nº36	Oksana Vyaçeslavovna Kelexsayeva	Independent	404
District Nº36	Tofiq Haqverdi Imanov	Great Azerbaijan Party	372
District Nº36	Ənvər Sərdar Ağazadə	Azerbaijan Hope Party	277
District Nº37	Aydin Nəsir Hüseynov	New Azerbaijan Party	13,720
District Nº37	Ariz Xudaverdi Zeynalov	White Party	1,017
District Nº37	Vüsal Oktay Həsənli	Independent	750
District Nº37	Səbinə Oktay Salahova	Independent	660
District Nº37	Nizaməddin Fərzali Məmmədov	Independent	483
District Nº37	Samir Adil Məmmədov	Republican Alternative Party	390
District Nº37	Kamil Əşrəf Paşayev	Independent	345
District Nº37	Taryel Mədət Məmmədov	Independent	194
District Nº38	Naqif Ələşrəf Həmzəyev	New Azerbaijan Party	12,861
District Nº38	Arifə Abbasəli Əhmədli	Independent	1,556
District Nº38	Rauf Müslüm Qurbanov	Independent	1,195
District Nº38	Oqtay Qəmbər Zeynalov	Musavat	1,063
District Nº38	Orxan Mehman Ismayilov	Independent	952
District Nº38	Rəşad Vasif Cabbarov	Independent	833
District Nº38	Şaib Süleyman Mahmudov	Independent	719
District Nº39	Pərvin Orxan Kərimzadə	New Azerbaijan Party	12,039
District Nº39	Eldar Zabit Aslanov	Azerbaijan National Independence Party	1,226
District Nº39	Elşən Hökumət Nəcəfov	Democratic Reforms Party	1,124
District Nº39	Səfa Islam Orucova	Azerbaijan Hope Party	1,075
District Nº39	Şahəddin Qüdrət Qasimov	Musavat	649
District Nº39	Arif Şahməddin Məmmədov	Independent	522
District Nº39	Aytən Rafiq Məmmədova	Independent	400
District Nº39	Günel Mirəhməd Əliyeva	Independent	336
District Nº40	Musa Isa Quliyev	New Azerbaijan Party	13,125
District Nº40	Salman Məhəmməd Imanli	Azerbaijan Hope Party	2,159
District Nº40	Mayil Vəli Vəliyev	Musavat	1,650
District Nº40	Əkbər Sabir Dünyamaliyev	Independent	1,332
District Nº40	Elçin Valeh Ismayilov	Right Justice Party	990
District Nº40	Səbinə Elman Hənifəyeva	Independent	331
District Nº40	Arif Emin Umani	Independent	193
District Nº41	Müşfiq Cəfər Cəfərov	New Azerbaijan Party	10,805
District Nº41	Toğrul Sayad Iskəndərli	Republican Alternative Party	1,619
District Nº41	Ceyhun Məmməd Əliyev	Independent	1,421
District Nº41	Muxtar Seyfullayeviç Əsədov	Independent	1,065
District Nº41	Nailə Islam Əliyeva	Independent	930
District Nº41	Kamil Nadir Qasimov	Independent	847
District Nº41	Güldanə Yunis Ağayeva	Independent	334
District Nº42	Hicran Kamran Hüseynova	New Azerbaijan Party	13,270
District Nº42	Yasəmən Taği Mahmudova	Independent	780
District Nº42	Kəramət Salam Salah	Independent	595
District Nº42	Ulduz Ismixan Quliyeva	Independent	489
District Nº42	Əyyub Qiyas Abasov	Civic Solidarity Party	441
District Nº42	Fidan Mirfuad Mahmudova	Independent	334
District Nº42	Kamil Xaliq Abdullayev	Independent	316
District Nº42	Şəfəq Nofəl Mayilova	Independent	304
District Nº42	Ramil Vahid Ağayev	Independent	301
District Nº42	Kamil Şirxan Bədəlov	Independent	234
District Nº42	Rəyasət Məmmədağa Bağirov	Classic People's Front Party	220
District Nº43	Tahir Famil Mirkişili	New Azerbaijan Party	10,527
District Nº43	Mirmahmud Mirəli Fəttayev	Classic People's Front Party	1,410
District Nº43	Nərmin Ikram Abbasli	White Party	818
District Nº43	Orxan Heybət Əliyev	Independent	391
District Nº43	Anar Isfəndiyar Hüseynov	Right Justice Party	353
District Nº43	Vasif Vaqif Əfəndiyev	Unity Party	331
District Nº43	Yusif Ziyad Salmanli	Civic Solidarity Party	311
District Nº43	Cavad Adişirin Cavadli	Musavat	307
District Nº43	Taleh Əkrəm Əlicanov	Independent	303
District Nº43	Kəmalə Bayram Məmmədova	Independent	285
District Nº43	Zaur Güləhməd Rəcəbov	Independent	244
District Nº44	Mehriban Hidayət Vəliyeva	New Azerbaijan Party	6,871
District Nº44	Akif Əlif Bayramov	Justice, Law, Democracy Party	3,462
District Nº44	Mansur Elxan Mansurzadə	Independent	2,229
District Nº44	Saleh Məhzun Şükürov	Independent	1,709
District Nº44	Rübabə Ilqar Əzizova	Independent	1,600
District Nº44	Səbinə Aqil Kərimova	Motherland Party	1,495
District Nº44	Dunay Yusif Imanov	Independent	1,004
District Nº44	Şəhla Yadigar Ismayilova	Independent	453
District Nº45	Səbinə Qədir Salmanova	Independent	10,657
District Nº45	Naib Ismixan Haciyev	New Azerbaijan Party	5,964
District Nº45	Vüqar Iltifat Abdullayev	Independent	466
District Nº45	Azər Məhərrəm Qasimov	Justice, Law, Democracy Party	305
District Nº45	Könül Maxsud Allahverdili	Independent	215
District Nº45	Ağamir Xəlil Aliyev	Independent	161
District Nº45	Araz Elman Muradzadə	Independent	143
District Nº46	Elnarə Seydulla Akimova	New Azerbaijan Party	11,897
District Nº46	Ədalət Izzət Qafarov	Independent	1,665
District Nº46	Elşən Məmmədaba Camalov	Independent	1,458
District Nº46	Şəfiqə Yusif Əzizova	Independent	1,458
District Nº46	Cəmilə Zakir Məmmədova	Independent	1,382
District Nº46	Rəşid Məmməd Məmmədov	Independent	1,079
District Nº47	Zaur Ramiz Şükürov	Independent	8,947
District Nº47	Musa Musa Mustafayev	New Azerbaijan Party	7,030
District Nº47	Lətafət Arif Həsənova	Civic Solidarity Party	1,171
District Nº47	Nuradə Məmmədrza Kərimova	Independent	799
District Nº47	Səbinə Valeh Qarayeva	Independent	779
District Nº47	Sona Rəşad Nəzərova	Independent	705
District Nº47	Emin Tofiq Nəbiyev	Independent	691
District Nº48	Nigar Fikrət Məmmədova	New Azerbaijan Party	10,540
District Nº48	Yalçin Məmiş Aliyev	Independent	2,082
District Nº48	Rəhim Rüfət Əhmədzadə	White Party	1,285
District Nº48	Məzahir Israyil Israyilov	Azerbaijan People's Party	1,193
District Nº48	Sevda Vasif Mikayilzadə	Independent	1,190
District Nº48	Rasim Məhəmməd Xudaverdiyev	Unity Party	811
District Nº49	Rizvan Novruz Nəbiyev	Independent	7,719
District Nº49	Faiq Allahverdi Xudayev	New Azerbaijan Party	5,586
District Nº49	Arzu Rafiq Hüseynova	Independent	1,111
District Nº49	Azər Qənbər Isgəndərov	Independent	941
District Nº49	Elbrus Şakir Allahverdiyev	Independent	603
District Nº49	Qəribəli Məhəmmədəli Azadəliyev	Independent	579
District Nº50	Ramid Zakir Namazov	New Azerbaijan Party	10,927
District Nº50	Niyaməddin Orduxan Orduxanli	Justice, Law, Democracy Party	2,357
District Nº50	Eldar Heydər Heydərov	Independent	1,981
District Nº50	Bildirçin Taği Davudova	Right Justice Party	982
District Nº50	Nuranə Tofiq Axundova	Motherland Party	927
District Nº50	Ibrahim Elşad Allahverdiyev	Independent	859
District Nº50	Ağaşirin Əli Məmmədov	Independent	492
District Nº51	Heydər Xaniş Əsədov	New Azerbaijan Party	12,629
District Nº51	Əli Allahverdi Bəşirli	Classic People's Front Party	1,054
District Nº51	Ilkin Ilham Nuraliyev	Unity Party	1,023
District Nº51	Aslan Şahmirzə Cəfərov	Independent	750
District Nº51	Nasir Nazim Məlikov	Independent	630
District Nº51	Iradə Yavər Cəlilova	Independent	607
District Nº51	Elvin Ağasəməd Əhmədov	Independent	491
District Nº51	Coşqun Sarvan Şixəliyev	Independent	454
District Nº51	Vasif Məhərrəm Novruzov	Republican Alternative Party	443
District Nº51	Zöhrab Vahid Ismayilov	Civic Solidarity Party	438
District Nº51	Peyman Akif Sadiqov	Independent	254
District Nº52	Ilham Kazim Məmmədov	New Azerbaijan Party	13,253
District Nº52	Rəsul Ağahəsən Cəfərov	Republican Alternative Party	2,800
District Nº52	Haci Məhyəddin Haciyev	Independent	1,690
District Nº52	Günay Arzu Haciyeva	Independent	585
District Nº52	Nicat Elxan Qasimov	Independent	358
District Nº52	Ülviyyə Saqi Yusifli	Independent	324
District Nº52	Hüseyn Süleyman Məhərrəmov	Independent	322
District Nº53	Əli Məhəmməd Hüseynli	New Azerbaijan Party	18,865
District Nº53	Ləman Sadiq Əliyeva	Independent	2,095
District Nº53	Kənan Yusif Zabitzadə	Independent	1,293
District Nº53	Vəfadar Telman Iskəndərov	Independent	1,211
District Nº53	Elnur Şahin Həmzəyev	Independent	1,197
District Nº53	Babək Ramiz Bəhrəmzadə	Independent	1,106
District Nº53	Asif Mürsəl Hidayətov	Independent	917
District Nº54	Aydin Böyükkişi Mirzəzadə	New Azerbaijan Party	5,838
District Nº54	Əmrah Qoşqar Həsənli	Independent	1,755
District Nº54	Qalib Şəmsəddin Ağa	Independent	891
District Nº54	Yeganə Zakir Məmmədli	Independent	565
District Nº54	Ələsgər Qəhrəman Əliyev	Independent	473
District Nº54	Sərvan Ilham Məmmədov	White Party	434
District Nº54	Şərəf Səməd Sərkərov	Independent	270
District Nº54	Tacəddin Ibrahim Əyyubov	Free Homeland Party	239
District Nº55	Müşfiq Fazil Məmmədli	New Azerbaijan Party	10,549
District Nº55	Xalidə Rza Niftəliyeva	Independent	3,257
District Nº55	Tural Eyyam Tağiyev	Independent	1,755
District Nº55	Rahib Firudun Bağirov	Independent	824
District Nº55	Ləman Bahadir Tağiyeva	Independent	782
District Nº55	Anar Məmmədmusa Şəkərov	Independent	473
District Nº56	Mahir Tahir Süleymanli	New Azerbaijan Party	10,131
District Nº56	Zeynal Muradxan Cavadov	Independent	2,077
District Nº56	Nurcahan Əli Əliyeva	Independent	1,450
District Nº56	Fərid Qalib Seyidli	Independent	1,074
District Nº56	Mehman Kərim Təhməzov	Independent	868
District Nº56	Sahib Imam Babayev	Independent	752
District Nº56	Rüstəm Rafiq Hidayətzadə	Republican Alternative Party	648
District Nº57	Ağalar Isrəfil Vəliyev	New Azerbaijan Party	11,902
District Nº57	Şəbnəm Ramazan Nəsirova	Independent	1,759
District Nº57	Məmməd Əliağa Qurbanov	Azerbaijan National Independence Party	1,212
District Nº57	Aysel Əbülfəz Cəfərova	Independent	1,067
District Nº57	Zöhrab Seyidağa Məmmədov	Justice, Law, Democracy Party	952
District Nº57	Xəyalə Fikrət Əmircanova	Independent	846
District Nº57	Pərviz Hacbala Əliosmanov	White Party	414
District Nº57	Samid Sanan Seyidov	Independent	384
District Nº58	Sevil Əlirazi Mikayilova	Independent	8,433
District Nº58	Könül Rəcəb Əskərova	New Azerbaijan Party	6,950
District Nº58	Çingiz Imris Şahbazi	Azerbaijan National Independence Party	726
District Nº58	Gültəkin Binətəli Əhmədova	Independent	271
District Nº58	Mircəlil Mireyyub Ağayev	Independent	253
District Nº58	Elçin Akif Haciyev	Independent	245
District Nº58	Imran Pirimali Iskəndərov	Independent	197
District Nº58	Şöhrət Səfixan Məhəmmədyarov	Independent	124
District Nº59	Əlibala Səttar Məhərrəmzadə	New Azerbaijan Party	12,023
District Nº59	Fərhad Qəhrəman Səttarov	Independent	1,689
District Nº59	Əlabbas Kamran Məhərrəmov	Independent	1,478
District Nº59	Fərid Nazim Əliyev	Independent	1,246
District Nº59	Yusif Qəşəm Abayev	Independent	1,099
District Nº59	Naib Əmrulla Niftəliyev	Independent	809
District Nº59	Aynur Yunis Abdullayeva	Independent	697
District Nº59	Aytən Bədəl Bədəlbəyli	Independent	662
District Nº59	Elməddin Cəfər Ələsgərli	Independent	652
District Nº59	Səbuhi Səxavət Səmədov	Independent	598
District Nº60	Anatoliy Xaimoviç Rafailov	Independent	11,177
District Nº60	Fidan Yusifəli Bağirova	New Azerbaijan Party	7,617
District Nº60	Zahir Qəzənfər Isayev	Independent	796
District Nº60	Ayaz Azər Hüseynov	Independent	543
District Nº60	Nərmin Kamran Abasova	Independent	474
District Nº60	Eldar Bəylər Abdullayev	Independent	400
District Nº60	Gilanə Telman Əskərova	Independent	365
District Nº61	Azər Camal Badamov	New Azerbaijan Party	10,107
District Nº61	Rəşad Əmirbəy Aslanov	Independent	6,251
District Nº61	Nazim Əlisman Osmanov	Independent	811
District Nº61	Sevinc Abusalat Məhsimova	Independent	485
District Nº61	Azad Şixkərim Kəlbiyev	Independent	470
District Nº61	Gülanə Məzahir Poladxanova	Independent	293
District Nº61	Kifayət Əsfəndiyar Şixmuradova	Independent	220
District Nº62	Əminə Həmid Ağazadə	Independent	11,302
District Nº62	Yadigar Təvəkgül Kazimova	New Azerbaijan Party	7,524
District Nº62	Ağalar Əhmədağa Mahmudov	Independent	469
District Nº62	Anar Mahir Həsənov	Independent	415
District Nº62	Rasim Məhəmməd Həsənov	Independent	354
District Nº62	Məhluqə Saleh Cəbrayilova	Independent	320
District Nº62	Kamil Kamal Kərimli	Independent	268
District Nº63	Rafael Baba Hüseynov	Civic Solidarity Party	10,985
District Nº63	Aqil Rahil Aslanov	New Azerbaijan Party	7,825
District Nº63	Suğra Böyükağa Cabarova	Independent	574
District Nº63	Vüsalə Namik Şükürlü	Independent	399
District Nº63	Elnur Mətləb Tağiyev	Independent	353
District Nº63	Vahid Qulaməli Qocayev	Independent	341
District Nº63	Ilham Ayazəli Mayilov	Independent	316
District Nº64	Sadiq Haqverdi Qurbanov	New Azerbaijan Party	13,681
District Nº64	Fikrət Əhməd Məlikov	Independent	2,278
District Nº64	Aytən Nizami Qurbanova	Independent	2,164
District Nº64	Xəyalə Adil Kərimova	Independent	1,286
District Nº64	Pərviz Fəxrəddin Quluyev	Independent	407
District Nº64	Iqbal Valeh Salahov	Independent	364
District Nº64	Ramil Ələşrəf Vəliyev	Independent	298
District Nº64	Elşən Teymur Cəfərov	Independent	256
District Nº64	Aysel Vaqif Məmmədova	Independent	186
District Nº65	Günay Fəzail Ağamali	Motherland Party	10,282
District Nº65	Emin Zülfüqar Ağayev	New Azerbaijan Party	6,665
District Nº65	Mirabas Haciağa Rzayev	Independent	951
District Nº65	Nahid Ceyhun Rüstəmbəyli	Independent	771
District Nº65	Rəşad Rufiq Dadaşov	Independent	686
District Nº65	Nigar Əlizadə Babayeva	Independent	556
District Nº65	Qalib Dədəmirzə Rzayev	Independent	149
District Nº65	Nərgiz Cahangir Cavadova	Independent	124
District Nº65	Nadir Saleh Ağayev	Independent	119
District Nº65	Zəbulla Nizami Hüseynov	Independent	95
District Nº66	Əziz Yusif Ələkbərov	New Azerbaijan Party	12,309
District Nº66	Şamxal Məhəmməd Ibayev	Independent	1,567
District Nº66	Elmir Asif Seyidov	Independent	1,411
District Nº66	Ülvi Cəmaləddin Həmidov	Independent	1,386
District Nº66	Elxan Mais Qurbanli	Independent	1,380
District Nº66	Mahidə Səməd Səmədzadə	Independent	813
District Nº66	Aqil Əliqulu Quliyev	Independent	358
District Nº67	Əhliman Tapdiq Əmiraslanov	New Azerbaijan Party	14,426
District Nº67	Xaqani Rafiq Gözəlov	Independent	1,303
District Nº67	Dilşad Meyxoş Əhədova	Independent	952
District Nº67	Teymur Nazim Məmmədov	Independent	934
District Nº67	Əzizağa Otarxan Babayev	Independent	899
District Nº67	Lamiyə Fikrət Zərbaliyeva	Independent	842
District Nº67	Vüsal Ilqar Sultanli	Independent	637
District Nº67	Rəna Balaqardaş Ağayeva	Unity Party	601
District Nº67	Farman Raxman Salmanov	Musavat	478
District Nº68	Kamal Xaqani Cəfərov	New Azerbaijan Party	12,840
District Nº68	Pənah Çodar Hüseyn	Azerbaijan People's Party	3,112
District Nº68	Səbirxan Qəfil Həmidov	Independent	1,486
District Nº68	Sevda Məhəmməd Əliyeva	Independent	1,368
District Nº68	Günay Əhəd Hüseynova	Independent	1,127
District Nº68	Elnur Ramazan Bayramov	Independent	928
District Nº68	Şirxan Inşallah Əkbərov	Independent	739
District Nº69	Bəhruz Abdurrəhman Məhərrəmov	Independent	10,352
District Nº69	Elməddin Saməddin Əliyev	New Azerbaijan Party	5,516
District Nº69	Yusif Haceyib Mehti	Musavat	1,270
District Nº69	Elşən Ədalət Ədalətli	Republican Alternative Party	787
District Nº69	Nuridə Saleh Mürsəlova	Independent	413
District Nº69	Nurlan Sabir Mirəli	Independent	382
District Nº69	Rahib Mirzəkərim Qəribov	Independent	293
District Nº69	Pərviz Iman Mirizadə	Motherland Party	232
District Nº70	Tənzilə Yolçu Rüstəmxanli	Civic Solidarity Party	5,806
District Nº70	Vəfa Camaləddin Nağiyeva	Independent	3,122
District Nº70	Sevinc Tapdiq Ağaliyeva	Independent	1,535
District Nº70	Fərhad Ceyhun Baxişov	New Azerbaijan Party	1,358
District Nº70	Mircəlal Mirsəmid Həmzəyev	Azerbaijan People's Party	269
District Nº70	Razim Əyyub Kərimov	Independent	115
District Nº70	Susana Şirzad Məmmədova	Independent	100
District Nº70	Rəna Daşqin Imanzadə	Independent	90
District Nº70	Qaraş Həsən Əliyev	Classic People's Front Party	89
District Nº70	Qəhrəman Baloğlan Tahirov	Independent	83
District Nº71	Malik Əvəz Həsənov	New Azerbaijan Party	12,585
District Nº71	Mahir Sucayət Hidayətov	Independent	1,790
District Nº71	Zəhra Əlizamin Qocazadə	Independent	1,725
District Nº71	Aslan Ismayil Əzimov	Azerbaijan Hope Party	709
District Nº71	Azər Əbülfəz Əsgərov	Musavat	499
District Nº71	Anar Ərəstun Məmmədzadə	Independent	446
District Nº71	Əzizxan Ağakərim Əzizxanli	Independent	407
District Nº72	Elman Xudam Nəsirov	New Azerbaijan Party	10,074
District Nº72	Xuraman Şakir Nuriyeva	Independent	2,556
District Nº72	Hicran Kamran Ibrahimova	Independent	2,392
District Nº72	Zamiq Adil Hüseynov	Independent	969
District Nº72	Cəmşid Fərəhməd Bayramov	Independent	954
District Nº72	Rahim Adiş Axundov	Musavat	329
District Nº72	Novruz Misir Quluzadə	Azerbaijan People's Party	101
District Nº73	Fəzail Feyruz Ibrahimli	Civic Solidarity Party	10,057
District Nº73	Aytən Ədalət Əliyeva	New Azerbaijan Party	5,659
District Nº73	Murad Əli Hüseynov	Independent	1,412
District Nº73	Şəmsəddin Dəhəzxan Əmirov	Musavat	891
District Nº73	Zaur Zakir Ələkbərov	Free Homeland Party	468
District Nº73	Lalə Qalib Nəzərova	Independent	370
District Nº73	Kamran Hakim Məmmədov	White Party	336
District Nº73	Şamxal Imaməddin Bağişov	Independent	282
District Nº73	Daşqin Ağarza Nuriyev	Azerbaijan Democrat Party	223
District Nº73	Elman Həsən Həsənov	Independent	162
District Nº74	Məşhur Şahbaz Məmmədov	New Azerbaijan Party	12,512
District Nº74	Seyran Burhan Nəcəfov	Independent	3,761
District Nº74	Cavidan Siyasət Xaliqzadə	Independent	857
District Nº74	Nuranə Rüstəm Məmmədova	Independent	836
District Nº74	Aysum Firdovsi Ağayeva	Independent	523
District Nº74	Elşən Hüseyn Hüseynov	Independent	485
District Nº74	Səfa Sevdagər Əzimov	Great Azerbaijan Party	306
District Nº75	Musa Cəfər Qasimli	Independent	9,120
District Nº75	Sərvər Məlikməmməd Əliyev	New Azerbaijan Party	5,673
District Nº75	Iqbal Həmzə Nəhmətov	Independent	814
District Nº75	Samir Şakir Əsədli	Civic Solidarity Party	758
District Nº75	Elşən Ənvər Məmişov	Independent	496
District Nº75	Türkanə Fizuli Bağişli	Independent	376
District Nº75	Vüqar Piri Dadaşov	National Front Party	366
District Nº76	Cavanşir Hümmət Paşazadə	New Azerbaijan Party	11,073
District Nº76	Natiqə Xanlar Nəhmətova	Independent	1,914
District Nº76	Yalçin Yəhya Heydərli	Independent	1,659
District Nº76	Rövşən Məmi Məmiyev	Independent	1,642
District Nº76	Murad Əyyar Əsədov	Independent	1,377
District Nº76	Fərid Zakir Kazimov	Independent	693
District Nº77	Fariz Akif Ismayilzadə	Independent	9,569
District Nº77	Əlimərdan Ələkbər Əliyev	New Azerbaijan Party	4,920
District Nº77	Orxan Elxan Qəhrəmanzadə	Independent	462
District Nº77	Sevanə Rasif Abbasova	Independent	398
District Nº77	Məmməd Ağalar Əliyev	Independent	255
District Nº77	Fuad Firdovsi Məmmədov	Independent	175
District Nº77	Fəridə Rafiq Rəhimli	Independent	143
District Nº78	Anar Camal Isgəndərov	New Azerbaijan Party	10,860
District Nº78	Tural Mayis Kazimli	Independent	1,688
District Nº78	Xoşbəxt Zahid Rəhimzadə	Independent	1,585
District Nº78	Nəsrulla Naib Məmmədov	Independent	1,353
District Nº78	Elçin Ağahəsən Səfərov	Independent	1,090
District Nº78	Tural Səxavət Quluzadə	Independent	899
District Nº78	Əzizxan Iman Əzizov	Independent	712
District Nº79	Rəşad Məmmədqulu Mahmudov	New Azerbaijan Party	12,534
District Nº79	Valentina Mixaylovna Əhmədova	Independent	1,762
District Nº79	Tural Mirzağa Hidayətov	Independent	1,345
District Nº79	Çingiz Məmməd Rahmanov	Independent	1,086
District Nº79	Yunus Vasif Yunuszadə	Independent	838
District Nº79	Fəzail Xanoğlan Həkimov	Independent	403
District Nº80	Vasif Vaqif Qafarov	Independent	9,634
District Nº80	Elman Əliheydər Rəcəbov	New Azerbaijan Party	4,784
District Nº80	Təyyar Kazim Yəhyayev	Independent	986
District Nº80	Mehti Məmmədağa Ağagülov	Independent	379
District Nº80	Nurəddin Höccət Haciyev	Independent	320
District Nº80	Cavid Rövşən Məmmədov	Independent	296
District Nº80	Aydan Arif Mirzəzadə	Independent	209
District Nº80	Mehriban Əli Paşayeva	Independent	192
District Nº80	Tahir Əli Hüseynov	Musavat	175
District Nº80	Şahlar Akif Məmmədov	Independent	113
District Nº81	Razi Qulaməli Nurullayev	National Front Party	8,300
District Nº81	Israfil Zakir Məmmədov	New Azerbaijan Party	6,530
District Nº81	Elnur Mənəf Məmmədov	Independent	881
District Nº81	Sakit Şirin Muradov	Independent	581
District Nº81	Adil Mədət Nağizadə	Independent	509
District Nº81	Günel Cabir Qarayeva	Independent	191
District Nº81	Vüsalə Qələndər Sadiqova	Independent	158
District Nº82	Səyyad Adil Salahli	New Azerbaijan Party	9,650
District Nº82	Rəşid Ağamirzə Məhərrəmli	Independent	2,144
District Nº82	Yasəmən Müslüm Qəyyumova	New Azerbaijan Party	2,036
District Nº82	Tapdiq Həsən Həsənov	Azerbaijan National Independence Party	1,421
District Nº82	Leyla Rəhim Nəcəfquliyeva	Independent	1,174
District Nº82	Ehtiram Təvəkkül Mehtiyev	National Front Party	1,091
District Nº82	Elmin Lənkəran Sadiqov	Independent	316
District Nº82	Azər Əjdər Şükürov	Independent	141
District Nº82	Səmayə Camal Rəhmanova	Independent	132
District Nº83	Şahin Əmir Ismayilov	New Azerbaijan Party	14,864
District Nº83	Züleyxa Nüsrət Ağayeva	Independent	4,026
District Nº83	Valeh Allahverdi Namazov	Independent	1,514
District Nº83	Sənan Nadir Mahmudlu	Independent	675
District Nº83	Sadiq Kamaləddin Məmmədov	Independent	507
District Nº83	Əhməd Məmmədəli Kərimov	Independent	439
District Nº84	Vüqar Ibad Bayramov	Independent	11,860
District Nº84	Namiq Ibrahim Məmmədov	New Azerbaijan Party	6,307
District Nº84	Mübariz Oruc Sadiqli	Independent	746
District Nº84	Günay Fikrət Imanzadə	Independent	582
District Nº84	Sultan Bəxtiyar Mahmudsoy-Dinçer	Independent	487
District Nº84	Rəhim Məstəli Məstəliyev	Independent	462
District Nº84	Gülşən Tələt Əhmədova	Independent	398
District Nº84	Anar Rafiq Isayev	Azerbaijan Hope Party	362
District Nº85	Aqil Məhəmməd Abbasov	Independent	10,691
District Nº85	Dəyanət Cəmil Cəfərov	New Azerbaijan Party	6,788
District Nº85	Anar Habil Qasimov	Independent	695
District Nº85	Şahmar Əşrəf Mehtiyev	Independent	651
District Nº85	Anar Möhtərəm Əliyev	Independent	525
District Nº85	Şükufə Şəmsəddin Haciyeva	Independent	199
District Nº85	Fəqan Ərşad Hüseynov	Independent	193
District Nº85	Anar Vaqif Hüseynov	Independent	183
District Nº86	Tahir Musa Rzayev	New Azerbaijan Party	17,048
District Nº86	Türkanə Mahir Balakişiyeva	Independent	2,886
District Nº86	Maya Ağamirzə Abdullayeva	Independent	1,848
District Nº86	Cavid Aydin Mirzəyev	Independent	1,604
District Nº86	Ağaxan Azər Quliyev	Independent	694
District Nº86	Isgəndər Əli Əkbərov	Independent	668
District Nº86	Cavid Ibrahim Hacibəyli	White Party	485
District Nº87	Şahin Kamil Seyidzadə	Independent	12,499
District Nº87	Rasim Ramis Novruzov	New Azerbaijan Party	4,416
District Nº87	Səfər Babaş Ibrahim	Independent	1,095
District Nº87	Əfrayil Rəfayil Şixməmmədov	Justice Party	869
District Nº87	Pirverdi Hüseyinağa Hüseynov	Independent	718
District Nº87	Səbinə Oqtay Yaqubova	Independent	559
District Nº87	Pərviz Haci Rüstəmov	Independent	405
District Nº88	Tamam Şaməmməd Cəfərova	Independent	9,498
District Nº88	Rəfail Vahid Tağizadə	New Azerbaijan Party	7,153
District Nº88	Rauf Əfqan Qurbanov	Independent	1,277
District Nº88	Şahin Rövşən Sərdarli	Independent	918
District Nº88	Intiqam Xanlar Zeynalov	Independent	521
District Nº88	Aliyə Məhəmmədismayil Ələkbərova	Independent	383
District Nº88	Pərvanə Əhməd Şixəliyeva	Independent	55
District Nº89	Novruzəli Davud Aslanov	Independent	10,682
District Nº89	Xavər Şahi Allahverdiyeva	New Azerbaijan Party	6,502
District Nº89	Rəhim Cahid Bağirli	Independent	654
District Nº89	Ilhamə Seyfəli Həsənova	Independent	537
District Nº89	Niyazi Süleyman Dadaşov	Independent	398
District Nº89	Səyahət Qurbanali Ələsgərov	Independent	283
District Nº89	Şakir Ağasəf Həmzəyev	Independent	239
District Nº90	Elçin Əbdülrəhim Mirzəbəyli	Justice, Law, Democracy Party	10,531
District Nº90	Əli Abbas Hüseynov	New Azerbaijan Party	7,311
District Nº90	Aləmzər Mütəllim Əliyeva	Independent	961
District Nº90	Elşən Alik Əliyev	Independent	524
District Nº90	Kənan Fəxrəddin Kərimov	Unity Party	393
District Nº90	Zabit Mübariz Bədəlov	Musavat	344
District Nº90	Zahid Ağairza Seyidzadə	Independent	281
District Nº90	Ruslan Ilyas Nəcəfov	Independent	97
District Nº91	Sabir Kamal Haciyev	Independent	11,025
District Nº91	Fərid Əkbər Əkbərov	New Azerbaijan Party	7,955
District Nº91	Elxan Rövşən Haciyev	Independent	956
District Nº91	Yusif Bəhram Rəsulov	Independent	395
District Nº91	Cəlal Zaur Məmmədov	Independent	365
District Nº91	Kənan Habil Qədirov	Independent	311
District Nº91	Aysu Seyyad Babayeva	Independent	290
District Nº92	Məzahir Cavid Əfəndiyev	Independent	9,097
District Nº92	Firəngiz Rafiq Məmmədyarova	New Azerbaijan Party	7,302
District Nº92	Akif Məmməd Kərimov	Independent	1,588
District Nº92	Süleyman Qoca Məmmədhüseynov	Independent	463
District Nº92	Məhluqə Natiq Babayeva	Independent	436
District Nº92	Mircavid Fəda Kazimov	Independent	414
District Nº92	Camaləddin Camaləddin Məmmədov	Independent	280
District Nº92	Vüsal Balacan Quliyev	White Party	228
District Nº93	Sahib Eyvaz Aliyev	Independent	10,592
District Nº93	Anar Raqif Şahmuradov	New Azerbaijan Party	7,663
District Nº93	Qalib Aslan Qarayev	Independent	1,583
District Nº93	Elmira Nahid Qafarova	Independent	640
District Nº93	Elmir Şahsəlim Gözəlov	Independent	409
District Nº93	Jalə Ağakişi Eminova	Independent	392
District Nº93	Haciağa Mirsahib Şirinov	Independent	382
District Nº94	Ramil Sahib Həsən	New Azerbaijan Party	12,500
District Nº94	Afət Məmməd Əzizova	Independent	2,032
District Nº94	Vaqif Firudin Çərkəzov	Independent	1,724
District Nº94	Ağarəhim Nəriman Tağiyev	Independent	1,669
District Nº94	Şəlalə Abduləziz Məmmədova	Independent	1,068
District Nº94	Gülnar Faiq Hüseynova	Civic Solidarity Party	911
District Nº94	Zakir Ağaəli Ismayil	Musavat	603
District Nº95	Jalə Fazil Əliyeva	Independent	10,384
District Nº95	Səliqə Oruc Ismayilova	New Azerbaijan Party	7,382
District Nº95	Zümrüd Nazim Nərimanli	Independent	950
District Nº95	Pünhan Məcid Süleymanli	Independent	893
District Nº95	Məhəmməd Nurəddin Məmmədli	Classic People's Front Party	862
District Nº95	Arzu Zahir Kərimova	Independent	761
District Nº95	Haqverdi Hüseyn Tapdiqov	Independent	414
District Nº96	Bədəl Şamil Bədəlov	New Azerbaijan Party	16,216
District Nº96	Ramin Maarif Şirinov	Independent	1,991
District Nº96	Şəhla Rüstəm Əlizadə	Independent	1,898
District Nº96	Xəyalə Hüseyn Məmmədova	Independent	1,725
District Nº96	Əli Səvindik Həzquluyev	Justice, Law, Democracy Party	957
District Nº96	Namaz Yusif	Musavat	823
District Nº96	Aydin Murad Nəcəfov	Modern Musavat Party	706
District Nº96	Imamverdi Səməd Verdiyev	Azerbaijan Hope Party	666
District Nº97	Anar Ilyaz Məmmədov	New Azerbaijan Party	14,941
District Nº97	Gülşən Aqil Əlizadə	Independent	1,568
District Nº97	Şahpələng Azər Əzimli	Independent	1,463
District Nº97	Zadə Şəhriyar Sərdar Məcid	Independent	1,198
District Nº97	Tapdiq Zərbəli Həsənov	Independent	1,037
District Nº97	Qələndər Şəmil Muxtarli	Independent	968
District Nº98	Xanlar Nuru Fətiyev	New Azerbaijan Party	13,213
District Nº98	Məhluqə Gülməmməd Rəhimova	Independent	1,799
District Nº98	Garay Xəlil Əsədov	Free Homeland Party	1,450
District Nº98	Hüseyn Sabir Bayramov	Classic People's Front Party	792
District Nº98	Namiq Musa Səfərov	Azerbaijan Hope Party	751
District Nº98	Qulu Qurban Quliyev	Independent	708
District Nº98	Gülsüm Mürşüd Babayeva	Independent	472
District Nº98	Ruslan Əlfəsiyab Abbasov	Independent	443
District Nº99	Fatma Vidadi Yildirim	New Azerbaijan Party	13,081
District Nº99	Şahin Əli Əhmədov	Classic People's Front Party	1,476
District Nº99	Rəfail Ali Tağizadə	Azerbaijan Hope Party	1,403
District Nº99	Murad Elşad Hüseynov	Civic Solidarity Party	685
District Nº99	Cəlal Camal Quliyev	Independent	605
District Nº99	Mübariz Qədir Ismayilov	Azerbaijan People's Party	576
District Nº99	Güllü Əli Abbaszadə	Independent	567
District Nº99	Ayşən Arif Isayeva	Independent	555
District Nº100	Kamran Fərhad Bayramov	New Azerbaijan Party	13,956
District Nº100	Fəxri Faiq Cəfərov	Independent	1,738
District Nº100	Toğrul Yunis Ismayilov	Modern Musavat Party	1,507
District Nº100	Nadir Məhərrəm Məmmədov	Free Homeland Party	1,346
District Nº100	Aytən Arif Rəhimli	Independent	1,190
District Nº100	Sevil Bəhram Əhmədova	Independent	1,141
District Nº100	Eltac Polad Əliyev	Independent	937
District Nº101	Mübariz Qəhrəman Qurbanli	New Azerbaijan Party	13,565
District Nº101	Şahirə Ilyas Isali	Independent	1,635
District Nº101	Könül Qüdrət Ibrahimova	Independent	1,578
District Nº101	Ilkin Dilqəm Əsgərov	Independent	1,546
District Nº101	Samir Ceyhun Həsənov	Independent	1,309
District Nº101	Teymur Sahib Yusifov	Independent	1,294
District Nº101	Qurban Rasim Məmmədov	Independent	1,044
District Nº101	Etibar Sucan Əkbərov	Musavat	655
District Nº102	Sahibə Əli Qafarova	New Azerbaijan Party	16,468
District Nº102	Səma Natiq Əliyeva	Independent	1,470
District Nº102	Fizuli Ismayil Qurbanov	Independent	1,188
District Nº102	Qəzənfər Natiq Namazov	Independent	1,148
District Nº102	Samirə Məhəmməd Səfərova	Independent	966
District Nº102	Sahib Yaqub Əliyev	Independent	922
District Nº102	Qədim Qədir Məmmədov	Independent	843
District Nº102	Rasim Mehman Imanli	Independent	728
District Nº103	Nurlan Urfan Həsənov	New Azerbaijan Party	15,213
District Nº103	Arzu Lətifovna Həsənova	Independent	1,916
District Nº103	Samir Həşim Əliyev	Independent	1,872
District Nº103	Murad Elman Rəhimli	Independent	1,597
District Nº103	Ruziyə Əsgər Əsgərova	Independent	1,534
District Nº103	Səddam Ismayil Ibrahimov	Independent	1,400
District Nº103	Toğrul Zabil Aliyev	Independent	1,203
District Nº104	Sevinc Əmirəhməd Hüseynova	New Azerbaijan Party	10,206
District Nº104	Elmira Fəhrad Əliyeva	Independent	1,826
District Nº104	Əziz Novruz Əliyev	Independent	1,684
District Nº104	Sənan Iman Rəhimzadə	Independent	1,462
District Nº104	Fayiq Sari Qarayev	Independent	1,262
District Nº104	Sahib Camal Məmməd	Independent	1,076
District Nº104	Sabir Rza Məmmədov	Musavat	797
District Nº105	Arzu Nəsib Nağiyev	Independent	11,425
District Nº105	Ilkin Abbas Hüseynov	New Azerbaijan Party	6,714
District Nº105	Tural Novruz Ismayilzadə	Independent	759
District Nº105	Elçin Ibad Qurbanov	Justice Party	747
District Nº105	Nizami Müslüm Qarayev	Independent	674
District Nº105	Nemət Mahmud Məmmədov	Independent	649
District Nº105	Ramidə Imran Məmmədova	Independent	635
District Nº106	Nizami Abdulla Səfərov	New Azerbaijan Party	11,783
District Nº106	Bahar Vaqif Babayeva	Independent	1,977
District Nº106	Günel Tahir Qasimova	Independent	1,575
District Nº106	Kamran Cəmil Həsənov	Independent	1,312
District Nº106	Təranə Yusif Əskərova	White Party	560
District Nº106	Çingiz Nəsimi Çingizzadə	Civic Solidarity Party	525
District Nº107	Ülviyyə Cavanşir Ağayeva	Independent	11,975
District Nº107	Humay Tofiq Aslanova	New Azerbaijan Party	7,479
District Nº107	Ramil Vahid Göyüşov	Independent	851
District Nº107	Mehriban Məmməd Məmmədova	Independent	469
District Nº107	Musa Qəmət Murquzov	Independent	384
District Nº107	Məlahət Musa Haciyeva	Independent	383
District Nº107	Kəmalə Mehrali Musazadə	Independent	358
District Nº108	Azər Kamal Əmiraslanov	Independent	10,825
District Nº108	Gülgün Kərim Kərimov	New Azerbaijan Party	6,648
District Nº108	Cəfər Telman Paşayev	Independent	582
District Nº108	Rəna Mirbaba Mansirova	Independent	445
District Nº108	Firəngiz Isman Əsgərova	Independent	405
District Nº108	Nicat Namiq Mehtixanov	Independent	382
District Nº108	Yusif Aruzə Şərifli	Independent	370
District Nº109	Səməd Ismayil Seyidov	New Azerbaijan Party	14,608
District Nº109	Günel Elxan Məmmədova	Justice, Law, Democracy Party	2,012
District Nº109	Vüqar Tapdiq Məmmədov	Independent	1,739
District Nº109	Avdal Mustafa Aşirov	Independent	1,607
District Nº109	Amil Əkbər Hüseynov	Independent	930
District Nº109	Azər Şofiq Hüseynov	White Party	883
District Nº109	Mahmud Əjdər Nuruyev	Motherland Party	340
District Nº109	Faimə Hüseyn Əliyeva	Independent	122
District Nº110	Nəsib Məhəmməd Məhəməliyev	New Azerbaijan Party	11,245
District Nº110	Əfsanə Ramazan Molulova	Independent	2,464
District Nº110	Eslanda Camaləddin Səlimova	Independent	2,299
District Nº110	Mustafa Dibir Dibirov	Independent	894
District Nº110	Cəmilə Ramazan Saxalova	Independent	601
District Nº110	Rəşad Tofiq Osmanov	Independent	545
District Nº110	Ceyhun Ilham Layicov	Independent	451
District Nº110	Elvin Ilham Paçalov	Independent	430
District Nº111	Azər Şəmşid Kərimli	Independent	10,860
District Nº111	Vüsalə Yusif Mahmudova	New Azerbaijan Party	2,679
District Nº111	Mahmud Nəsrəddin Məmmədli	White Party	1,856
District Nº111	Iradə Zumrad Zərqanayeva	Independent	767
District Nº111	Məhəmməd Sədullah Əfəndiyev	Independent	716
District Nº111	Fidan Ibrahim Kərimova	Independent	533
District Nº111	Mübariz Isaq Ismayilov	Azerbaijan Democrat Party	473
District Nº111	Bəhmən Tofiq Xanəlizadə	Azerbaijan National Independence Party	437
District Nº112	Asif Yunis Əsgərov	New Azerbaijan Party	16,526
District Nº112	Şəmsəddin Zeynal Qurbanov	Independent	2,389
District Nº112	Röya Şamil Abbasova	Independent	434
District Nº112	Ilqar Abdurahman Ibrahimov	Great Azerbaijan Party	408
District Nº112	Eşqin Məmməd Şitayev	Independent	353
District Nº112	Nailə Bəşir Xaşayeva	Independent	317
District Nº112	Aytəkin Dibir Ismayilova	Independent	306
District Nº113	Əli Əhməd Məsimli	Independent	10,059
District Nº113	Mithad Bəhərçi Sayadov	New Azerbaijan Party	4,842
District Nº113	Qorxmaz Nurullah Əliyev	Independent	1,326
District Nº113	Əhməd Şair Şahidov	Independent	719
District Nº113	Aydin Vaqif Hüseyinov	Independent	707
District Nº113	Şəhla Həbibullah Qadaşova	Independent	421
District Nº113	Arzu Lətif Əhmədova	Independent	313
District Nº113	Teymur Elman Əzizov	Independent	231
District Nº113	Gülbahar Məhəmmədnəbi Abdullayeva	Independent	150
District Nº113	Nazim Camal Babayev	Independent	8
District Nº114	Vüqar Yapon Iskəndərov	New Azerbaijan Party	11,057
District Nº114	Adil Əbülfət Qeybulla	Independent	2,810
District Nº114	Razim Rza Rzayev	Republican Alternative Party	1,840
District Nº114	Əlirza Qəhrəman Məhərrəmov	Independent	1,215
District Nº114	Tahir Camal Səfərli	Musavat	875
District Nº114	Nübar Rza Abdullayeva	Independent	704
District Nº114	Elnur Həsənsultan Camalov	Independent	441
District Nº114	Elnur Tacəddin Orucov	Independent	241
District Nº115	Cavanşir Əyyub Feyziyev	Independent	11,123
District Nº115	Niymət Yusif Yusibov	New Azerbaijan Party	6,085
District Nº115	Bakixan Həsrət Qəribli	Musavat	993
District Nº115	Azər Məclum Şükür-Zadə	Independent	561
District Nº115	Aybəniz Məmməd Ibrahimova	Independent	306
District Nº115	Xəyal Asif Abdurəhmanov	Independent	272
District Nº115	Anar Elxan Məmmədov	Independent	242
District Nº115	Şərqiyyə Əbülfət Seyidova	Independent	100
District Nº116	Elşən Məmmədhənifə Musayev	Azerbaijan Democratic Enlightenment Party	10,432
District Nº116	Ədilə Əli Əliyeva	New Azerbaijan Party	6,775
District Nº116	Durna Eldar Musazadə	Independent	479
District Nº116	Azər Ilyas Ilyasov	Independent	447
District Nº116	Isgəndər Abdulla Kərimli	Independent	427
District Nº116	Elşad Nərman Abdurəhmanov	Independent	413
District Nº116	Vəfadar Imam Mikayilov	Independent	385
District Nº116	Rüfət Hakim Əhmədov	Independent	189
District Nº116	Elçin Əliyəddin Mirzəliyev	Independent	187
District Nº116	Mehman Nizam Əliyev	Independent	132
District Nº117	Eyvaz Daşdəmir Qurbanov	New Azerbaijan Party	11,951
District Nº117	Tural Ələsgər Əbdürəhmanov	Independent	1,634
District Nº117	Səmayə Fikrət Fərəcova	Independent	1,572
District Nº117	Günel Çingiz Əzizova	Independent	1,453
District Nº117	Elçin Səda Haciyev	Azerbaijan Hope Party	1,379
District Nº117	Rahib Vəli Ismayilov	Independent	713
District Nº117	Nizami Yaqub Abdurrazakov	Classic People's Front Party	643
District Nº117	Qalib Allahverdi Ağayev	Independent	623
District Nº118	Elman Camal Məmmədov	New Azerbaijan Party	16,740
District Nº118	Gözəl Mehman Cabbarova	Independent	3,551
District Nº118	Musa Habil Ağayev	New Time Party	1,690
District Nº118	Ceyhun Etibar Ismayilzadə	Independent	968
District Nº118	Ləman Fəxrəddin Cəfərova	Independent	805
District Nº118	Emin Sahib Əliyev	Independent	787
District Nº118	Vüqar Ziyəddin Əliyev	Independent	675
District Nº118	Şövkət Malik Əfqanli	Independent	630
District Nº119	Bəxtiyar Həmzə Əliyev	Independent	13,199
District Nº119	Ibrahim Raqif Məmmədov	New Azerbaijan Party	9,010
District Nº119	Azər Səhlik Qasimov	Independent	979
District Nº119	Şəbnəm Ilham Səfərova	Independent	651
District Nº119	Asif Millət Məmmədov	Independent	624
District Nº119	Aynurə Nuşirəvan Hüseynova	Independent	122
District Nº119	Hüseyn Mehrali Behbudov	Azerbaijan People's Party	100
District Nº119	Etibar Haşim Səfərov	Independent	96
District Nº119	Xəyalə Soltan Məmmədova	Independent	52
District Nº120	Ceyhun Valeh Məmmədov	New Azerbaijan Party	21,022
District Nº120	Araz Vəli Şahverdiyev	New Azerbaijan Party	3,587
District Nº120	Sərdar Əbülfət Ismayilov	Independent	1,415
District Nº120	Natəvan Məhərrəm Ağayeva	Independent	1,395
District Nº120	Gülçöhrə Ağahüseyn Hüseynova	Independent	1,153
District Nº120	Müşviq Alica Mehdixanov	Independent	833
District Nº120	Hidayət Fehruz Allahverdi	Musavat	647
District Nº121	Rövşən Şahbaz Muradov	New Azerbaijan Party	17,252
District Nº121	Əli Şükür Məlikov	Independent	2,311
District Nº121	Elçin Elxan Hüseynov	Independent	2,092
District Nº121	Kəmalə Rövşən Quluyeva	Independent	1,657
District Nº121	Əkrəm Ramiz Əhmədov	Independent	1,432
District Nº121	Faiq Islam Ismayilov	Justice, Law, Democracy Party	1,147
District Nº121	Babək Səyavuş Kərimov	Independent	1,025
District Nº121	Emin Fərəc Ibadzadə	Independent	988
District Nº122	Tural Babaşah Gəncəliyev	Independent	2,137
District Nº122	Aqil Kamran Məmmədov	New Azerbaijan Party	1,036
District Nº122	Aytac Elxan Kazimova	Independent	184
District Nº122	Jalə Babək Oqtayzadə	Independent	131
District Nº122	Şəfəq Adil Quliyeva	Civic Solidarity Party	57
District Nº122	Zamin Qürbət Hümbətov	Independent	23
District Nº123	Mircəlil Xəqani Qasimli	Independent	13,015
District Nº123	Samir Zakir Orucov	Independent	3,779
District Nº123	Aidə Ələsgər Əhmədova	New Azerbaijan Party	2,992
District Nº123	Etibar Bəhmən Abbasov	Independent	2,036
District Nº123	Xalid Nəriman Mirzəyev	Independent	1,679
District Nº123	Zahid Fəhrad Muxdarov	Independent	531
District Nº123	Kamil Həsən Hüseynov	Independent	431
District Nº123	Məhəmməd Yusif Bağirov	Independent	413
District Nº123	Rəhman Lətif Zülfüqarov	Independent	271
District Nº123	Solmaz Cabbar Cəmilova	Independent	220
District Nº123	Ismayil Türkel Ələddin Əliquliyev	Independent	165
District Nº123	Səxavət Ellaz Süleymanov	Independent	158
District Nº124	Polad Bülbüloğlu	Independent	14,862
District Nº124	Leyla Adil Babişova	New Azerbaijan Party	6,962
District Nº124	Akif Qazax Naği	Free Homeland Party	1,216
District Nº124	Mübariz Yaqub Əliyev	Independent	1,192
District Nº124	Hamlet Həsrət Gülməmmədov	Independent	799
District Nº124	Güləli Qəhrəman Bağirov	Independent	354
District Nº124	Elxan Bəhmən Süleymanli	Independent	220
District Nº125	Imamverdi Ibiş Ismayilov	New Azerbaijan Party	16,665
District Nº125	Intiqam Valeh Aliyev	Independent	2,942
District Nº125	Sevil Məhərrəm Axundova	Independent	2,004
District Nº125	Nigar Elman Ələsgərova	Independent	1,814
District Nº125	Oktay Cəfər Haciyev	Independent	1,554
District Nº125	Ramin Allahverdi Əlizadə	Independent	1,542
District Nº125	Ceyhun Tahir Qocayev	Independent	1,518

== Aftermath ==
Musavat refused to recognize the legitimacy of the new parliament and called for another vote, describing the election as "accompanied by widespread violations, including multiple voting by the same individuals and groups, ballot stuffing, and pressure on observers."

The Organization for Security and Co-operation in Europe denounced the election as having "fallen well short of democratic standards." Its election monitors also reported that the election campaign had been "barely visible" and that the election was "a contest devoid of competition."

On 23 September Sahiba Gafarova was re-elected as speaker of the National Assembly.
