= Justice Party (Azerbaijan) =

Justice Party Ədalət Partiyası
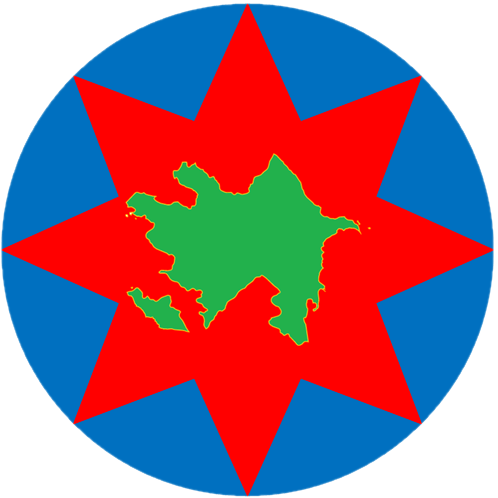
- Headquarters: Baku, Azerbaijan
- Ideology: Social liberalism Social democracy Progressivism
- Political position: Centre-left
- Colors

The Justice Party (Azerbaijani: Ədalət Partiyası) is a social liberal, social democratic and a progressivist political party in Azerbaijan.

== History ==
The party was registered in May 2002. Ilyas Ismayilov was its candidate in the 2003 presidential election, finishing fifth out of eight candidates with 1% of the vote. In the 2005 parliamentary elections the party gained parliamentary representation, winning one seat in the National Assembly. The party retained its seat in the 2010 parliamentary elections. Ismayilov was the party's candidate again for the 2013 presidential elections, finishing sixth out of ten candidates with 1.1% of the vote.

The party lost its representation in parliament in the 2015 parliamentary elections and subsequently failed to win a seat in the 2020 and 2024 parliamentary elections.
