= Azerbaijan Hope Party =

Azerbaijan Hope Party Ümid Partiyası
- Abbreviation: ÜP
- Leader: Igbal Agazade
- Chairperson: Igbal Agazade
- Founder: Abulfat Ahmadov
- Founded: 1993
- Legalised: 5 May 1995
- Headquarters: Baku, Azerbaijan
- Membership: 59,000
- Ideology: Civic nationalism; Economic liberalism; Social justice; Progressivism
- Political position: Centre-right
- Colours: Yellow
- Slogan: "Ümidli gələcək, ümidlə gələcək"
- Seats in the National Assembly: 0 / 125

Party flag

Website
- Website of the Hope Party

The Azerbaijan Hope Party (Azerbaijani: Azərbaycan Ümid Partiyası) or Ümid Party is a political party that was first registered in Azerbaijan in 1993. Its political stance is center-right, promoting liberal and democratic ideals. The party has regional branches in 65 regions of Azerbaijan and some 5,000 members.

== History ==
The Ümid Party was first registered in 1993. In December 2002, Iqbal Agazade left the Civic Unity Party (CUP) and became leader of the Ümid Party.

During the 2003 electoral campaigning period, the party held meetings in Baku and in regional areas. The 2003 Azerbaijani presidential election took place on 15 October 2003. After voting finished, the party raised concern that there had been cases of voter suppression and on 16 October, that results had been falsified. On 17 October, Igbal Agazadeh and his associates were arrested. Agazadeh was sentenced by a criminal court to 3 years imprisonment.

International organisations advocated for Agazadeh. On 20 March 2005, he was granted amnesty by presidential edict. In 2005 campaigning period, the party presented 30 candidates to the electorate. Agazadeh was elected to the Milli Majlis (National Assembly of Azerbaijan).

In 2010, the party joined the Qarabağ voting bloc. The bloc included the Azerbaijan Democrat Party and the Intelligentsia Party.

At the 9 February 2020 election, the party presented some 70 candidates to the voters. However, on 11 February, the 2020 election results were deemed null and void.

Between 2011 and 2020, the Azerbaijan Ministry of Justice registered no new political parties. However, in 2021 at least seven new political parties were registered. In addition to this relaxing of electoral conditions, the incumbents began talks with opposition parties. The Hope Party participated. Agazade said, "It is better to have an exchange of ideas across a table than stand far away from each other and fight".

Former members of the Azerbaijani Social Democratic Party and the Civic Unity Party joined the Hope Party.

In 2023, government regulations contributed to the demise of some of Azerbaijan's long-standing political parties such as the CUP and the Azerbaijani Social Democratic Party (ASDP). However, the Hope Party maintained its standing and some 5,000 members.

== Election results ==
=== Presidential elections ===
Election	Party candidate	Votes	%	Result
2008	Igbal Aghazade	104,279	2.86%	Lost ✗
2013	Igbal Aghazade	88,723	2.40%	Lost ✗

=== National Assembly elections ===
Election	Leader	Votes	%	Seats	+/–	Position	Government
2005	İqbal Ağazadə			1 / 125	New	▲5th	Opposition
2010	İqbal Ağazadə	21,605	0.90	1 / 125	0	▼9th	Opposition
2015	İqbal Ağazadə	14,815	0.52	0 / 125	▼1	▼10th	Extra-parliamentary
2020	İqbal Ağazadə	7,565	0.32	0 / 125	0	10th	Extra-parliamentary
2024	İqbal Ağazadə	12,858	0.54	0 / 125	0	10th	Extra-parliamentary

== Bibliography ==
- Central Committee of Azerbaijani Hope Party (2003). "MANIFESTO", Ümid Party, https://www.umidparty.org/nizamnam%c9%99/
