= Vidadi Isgandarov =

Azerbaijani human rights activist and politician

- Vidadi İsgəndərov
- Occupation: activist
- Known for: 2012 imprisonment

Vidadi Isgandarov (Azerbaijani: Vidadi İsgəndərov) is an Azerbaijani human rights activist and politician.

Isgandarov stood unsuccessfully for office in the 2010 Azerbaijani parliamentary election representing the rayons of Agdash and Goychay. In November 2010, the government of Azerbaijan opened a criminal investigation of Isgandarov for "prevention of voting rights by threatening, using force" (article 159.4.1 of the Criminal Code) and "interfering or influencing the work of the election commissions by threatening, using force or threatening to use force" (article 160.2.1 of the Criminal Code). According to Amnesty International, the charges were later dropped due to lack of evidence, but were reinstated in May 2011, one month after Isgandarov was arrested at an anti-government rally on 17 April. After the rally, he was sentenced to fifteen days' administrative imprisonment for an "attempt to hold protest action".

A new arrest warrant was issued for Isgandarov on 3 May 2011, one day after he was scheduled to be released from detention. On 27 August, Isgandarov was sentenced to three years' imprisonment for the vote-tampering charges. Amnesty protested the sentence and designated him a prisoner of conscience. The Council of Bars and Law Societies of Europe also wrote to Azerbaijani President Ilham Aliyev calling for Isgandarov's immediate release. The International Federation for Human Rights condemned the sentence as part of a pattern of "constant judicial harassment". On October 2, 2024, Vidadi Isgandarov died in hospital in Mulhouse, after being stabbed multiple times in his office in France.
