= 2009 Azerbaijani constitutional referendum =

A constitutional referendum was held in Azerbaijan on 18 March 2009. The referendum, initiated by the authoritarian Ilham Aliyev regime, asked the voters whether they approved of 29 measures. The most controversial of these included a measure to abolish presidential term limits, enabling Aliyev to run for president beyond two terms, and a measure to greatly restrict press freedom.

The measures passed, with approval of measures between 87.14% and 91.76%, disapproval between 4.59% and 7.24% and invalid votes between 3.64% and 5.70%; the turnout was 71.08%. The referendum was marred by fraud.

This provision of the constitutional amendment was condemned by the Venice Commission of the Council of Europe, which stated that "As a rule, it can be said that the abolition of existing limits preventing the unlimited re-election of a President is a step back, in terms of democratic achievements". Professor Wojciech Sadurski, Challis Professor of Jurisprudence at the Faculty of Law of Sydney University, in his legal opinion stated that the conduct of the Azeri government in the adoption of the amendment violated the principle of transparency and that it constituted a breach of European law under the European Convention on Human Rights as well as the international law. The amendment was also criticized by the Azerbaijani opposition.

On the basis of the amendment in 2013, Ilham Aliyev ran for president for the third time.
