= White Party (Azerbaijan) =

- Chairman: Tural Abbaslı
- Founded: 1993

The White Party (Azerbaijani: Ağ Partiya) is a political party in Azerbaijan.

== History ==
The party was established in 1993 by Kerar Abilov as the United Azerbaijan Party. Abilov contested the presidential elections that year, finishing second but with only 40,000 votes to the 3.9 million claimed to have been received by incumbent president Heydar Aliyev.

In 2016 Tural Abbaslı left the Musavat party and joined United Azerbaijan. In a party congress held on 26 June 2016 the party's name was changed to the White Party and Abbaslı was elected as chairman. However, the name change was not recognised by the Ministry of Justice until 2020. The party contested the 2020 parliamentary elections under its original name, receiving 0.3% of the vote and failing to win a seat.

In the 2024 parliamentary elections the party received 0.6% of the vote, again failing to win a seat. The party attributed this to manipulations and violations of electoral procedures.

== Party Leader ==
Tural Abbasli, who has been leading the "Ağ Partiya" since 2016, is known for his conservative views. He is active in the media space and frequently criticizes the current government. Currently, he is considered one of the most influential opposition figures. His popularity is especially evident on social media platforms such as Facebook, Instagram, and TikTok, where his total number of followers exceeds half a million, a record among all opposition representatives. Furthermore, the number of positive comments and supportive feedback about his activities continues to grow, further strengthening his position in public perception.

== Political Platform ==
Supporting Local Production: The party advocates for supporting local producers through subsidies, tax incentives, and protective measures to reduce dependency on imports and promote domestic economic growth.

Creating Job Opportunities: It supports initiatives to increase employment opportunities in sectors related to traditional crafts, agriculture, and small businesses.

Fighting Corruption: The party is reported to adopt a strict anti-corruption policy.

== Foreign Policy ==
Relations with Turkey: The party emphasizes the importance of close cooperation with Turkey, not only as a strategic partner but also as a cultural ally rooted in shared history, language, and religion.

Relations with the West: The party criticizes Western liberal values, viewing them as a potential threat to Azerbaijan’s national and religious traditions. However, it acknowledges the importance of economic and political ties and does not advocate complete isolation from the West.

Cooperation with Russia and Iran: The party recognizes the importance of maintaining good relations with Russia and Iran but remains cautious about their influence on Azerbaijan’s internal affairs.

== Election results ==
=== Presidential elections ===
| Election | Party candidate | Votes | % | Result |
|---|---|---|---|---|
| 1993 | Kerar Abilov | 40,298 | % | Lost ✗ |

=== National Assembly elections ===
| Election | Leader | Votes | % | Seats | +/– | Position | Government |
|---|---|---|---|---|---|---|---|
| 2020 | Tural Abbaslı | 6,358 | 0.27 | 0 / 125 | New | ▲13th | Extra-parliamentary |
| 2024 | Tural Abbaslı | 13,564 | 0.57 | 0 / 125 | 0 | ▲9th | Extra-parliamentary |
