= 2008 Azerbaijani presidential election =

- 15 October 2008
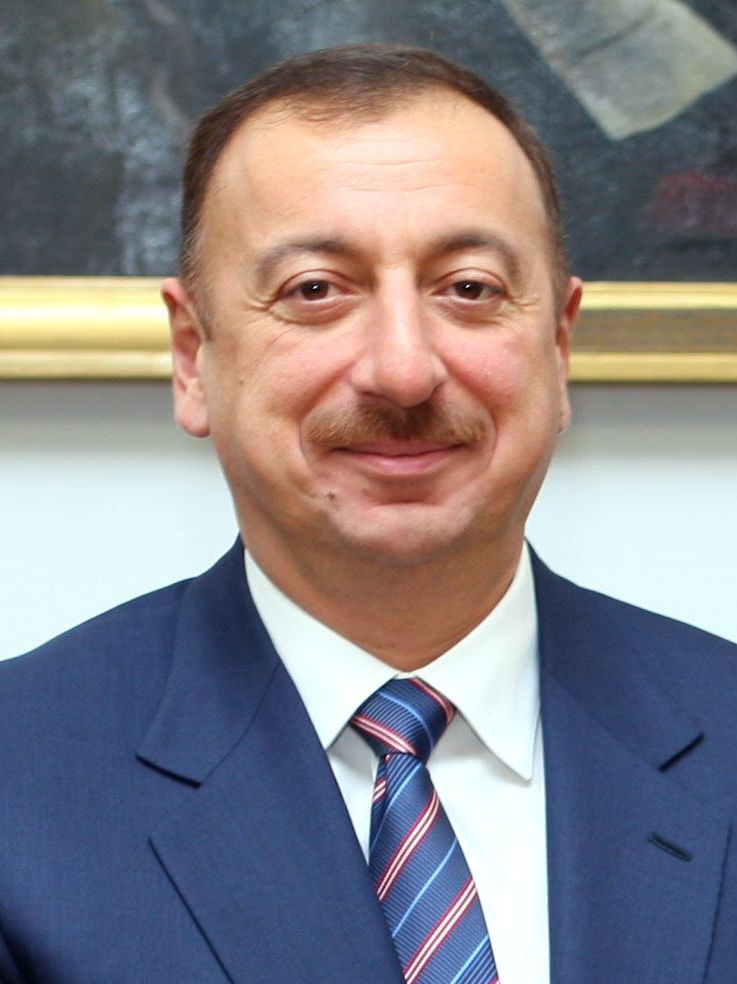

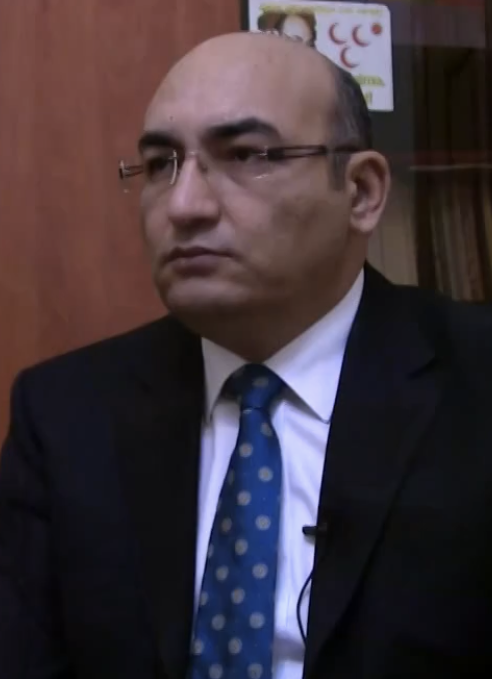
Nominee	Ilham Aliyev	Igbal Aghazade
Party	New Azerbaijan	Party of Hope
Popular vote	3,232,259	104,279
Percentage	88.73%	2.86%
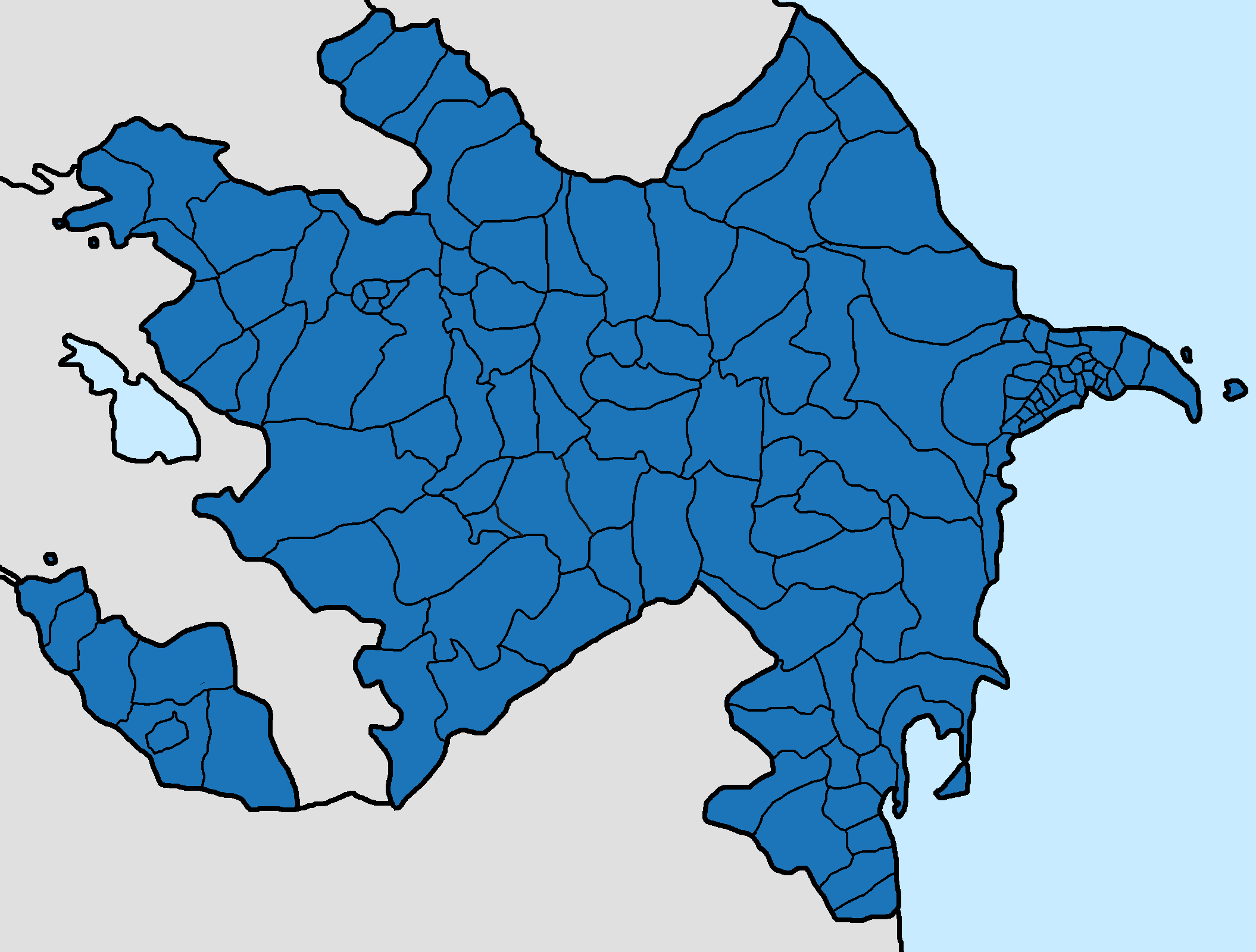
- Results of the elections by constituencies Ilham Aliyev
President before election
Ilham Aliyev
New Azerbaijan
Elected President
Ilham Aliyev
New Azerbaijan

Presidential elections were held in Azerbaijan on 15 October 2008. The incumbent Ilham Aliyev of the New Azerbaijan Party was re-elected with 89% of the vote. Several shortcomings in the election were highlighted.

In the lead-up to the election, OSCE highlighted election irregularities and government repression of the opposition. The opposition were not allowed by the government to hold campaign rallies. Students and state workers were coerced into attending pro-Aliyev rallies and were also bussed to polling places to vote for Aliyev.

All major opposition parties, including Musavat, the Azerbaijan Popular Front Party, Azerbaijan Liberal Party, and the Azerbaijan Democratic Party boycotted the vote because of alleged poll-fixing and oppression of political opponents. Aside from Aliyev, none of the candidates running in the election were well known.

== Background ==
The incumbent, Ilham Aliyev, was nominated by the New Azerbaijan Party for a second term on 3 August 2008. Musavat, the Azerbaijan Popular Front Party, the Azerbaijan Liberal Party, the Citizen and Progress Party, and the Azerbaijan Democratic Party announced their boycott of the election due to unfair conditions. In response, an aide to Aliyev claimed that the opposition withdrew because it "knew that President Aliyev would win the elections with a majority." A total of seven candidates filed to run in the election. Each of the candidates had to collect 40,000 support signatures.

Campaigning officially began in mid-September. The candidates were limited to a four-week campaigning period by law. According to Radio Free Europe/Radio Liberty, IRFS and RSF, the media (state-owned and private) showed bias in favor of Aliyev's candidacy.

== Conduct ==
The election was observed by more than 500 international observers, mostly from the Organization for Security and Co-operation in Europe (OSCE). The OSCE said that there was progress in the elections compared to past ones, however it did not meet international standards, because of the lack of competition to the incumbent, Aliyev. The NATO Secretary General, Jaap de Hoop Scheffer, stated that he "welcomes reports from the international election observers from OSCE, Council of Europe and the European Parliament indicating progress in the conduct of Azerbaijan’s presidential elections on 15 October 2008. Azerbaijan should build on this achievement and address the remaining shortcomings that were noted."

Avez Temirhan of the election-boycotting Azerbaijan Liberal Party said, "This leadership is not legitimate and its election does not reflect the will of the people."

== Results ==
A total of seven candidates registered with the Central Election Commission.

The incumbent, Ilham Aliyev, won the election with over 88% of the vote, and Igbal Aghazade came in second with 2.86%. Voter turnout was 75.1%. Fuad Aliyev and Hafiz Hajiev, as in 2003, received fewer votes than supporting signatures. Eight polling places' votes were invalidated.

Candidate	Party	Votes	%
Ilham Aliyev	New Azerbaijan Party	3,232,259	88.73
Igbal Aghazade	Party of Hope	104,279	2.86
Fazil Mustafa	Great Order Party	89,985	2.47
Gudrat Hasanguliyev	Whole Azerbaijan Popular Front Party	83,037	2.28
Gulamhuseyn Alibayli	Independent	81,120	2.23
Fuad Aliyev	Liberal-Democrat	28,423	0.78
Hafiz Hajiyev	Modern Equality Party	23,771	0.65
Total		3,642,874	100.00
Valid votes		3,642,874	98.44
Invalid/blank votes		57,760	1.56
Total votes		3,700,634	100.00
Registered voters/turnout		4,927,561	75.10
Source: CEC
