= Azerbaijan Social Prosperity Party =

The Azerbaijan Social Prosperity Party (Azerbaijani: Azərbaycan Sosial Rifah Partiyası) was a political party in Azerbaijan founded on 4 August 1995.

At the elections (5 November 2000 and 7 January 2001), the party won 1 out of 125 seats. At the parliamentary elections of 6 November 2005 the party kept 1 seat, and it did the same in the 2010 and 2015 elections. The first chairman of the party was Khanhuseyn Kazimli, the final chairman of the party is Asli Kazimova (daughter of Khanhuseyn Kazimli).

The party was dissolved on 23 March 2023.
