= Amiraslan Isgandarov =

Alleged head of a Salafist group in Baku, Azerbaijan

Amiraslan Alikhan oglu Isgandarov (Azerbaijani: Əmiraslan Əlixan oğlu İsgəndərov; born 1976) was the alleged head of a Salafist group in Baku, Azerbaijan.

From 1999 to 2003, he attended Afghan training camps, and ostensibly studied how to focus on recruiting young female mujahideen. TNT, grenades and detonators were seized during the arrest.

The Ministry of National Security released a press notice claiming that Isgandarov "engaged in anti-Azerbaijan campaign [sic] among representatives of ethnic minorities instilling hosility and hatred towards Azerbaijan", and accused him of trying to form a "Jamaat" or army.

== Trial ==
After a closed trial, Azerbaijan's Court for Serious Crimes passed sentence on Isgandarov and five accomplices, Alirza Macid oglu Babayev (b. 1965), Zaur Aliyevich Aliyev (b. 1984), Abdulla Mahammadovich Mahammadov (b. 1986), Sumgayit Hidayet Pirivey (b. 1971) and Rizvan Abdulgadirov. Isgandarov and Babayev were each sentenced to 14 years imprisonment, under 28.214.2.1 for illegal possession of explosives and ammunition, while Abdulla and Alivey were sentenced to 5 years under 228.2.1 and Abdulgadirov was sentenced to 3 years under 228.1.
