= New Azerbaijan Party =

Azerbaijani political party

New Azerbaijan Party Yeni Azərbaycan Partiyası
- Abbreviation: YAP
- President: Ilham Aliyev
- Vice President: Mehriban Aliyeva
- Founder: Heydar Aliyev
- Founded: 21 November 1992
- Registered: 18 December 1992
- Headquarters: Sergey Senyuşkin küç. 26, Baku
- Youth wing: Yeni Azərbaycan Partiyası Gənclər Birliyi
- Women's wing: Qadınlar Şurası
- Membership: ▲773,770 (2022 est.)
- Ideology: Conservatism; Statism; Social market economy; Azerbaijani nationalism; Azerbaijani irredentism; Pan-Turkism; Authoritarianism
- Political position: Centre-right
- Continental affiliation: International Conference of Asian Political Parties; European Conservatives and Reformists Group (CLRA only)
- International affiliation: For the Freedom of Nations! Centrist Democrat International (observer)
- Colours: Blue; Yellow
- National Assembly: 68 / 125

Website
- www.yap.org.az

The New Azerbaijan Party (Azerbaijani: Yeni Azərbaycan Partiyası, YAP) is the ruling political party in Azerbaijan, founded on 21 November 1992 under the leadership of Heydar Aliyev. After his election as President of Azerbaijan on 3 October 1993, and the party's victory at 1995 parliamentary elections, YAP became the ruling party, a position it has held since. President Ilham Aliyev has been chairman of YAP since its 3rd congress held on 26 March 2005.

YAP is a member of the International Conference of Asian Political Parties (ICAPP) and an observer member of the Centrist Democrat International. The party's rule over the country has been described as authoritarian.

== Ideology and views ==
The party's stated ideologies and stances are lawfulness, secularism, and Azerbaijani nationalism. It wants to build a "social-oriented" economy, and lists civil solidarity and social justice as the basis of its ideology. The founder of the party, Heydar Aliyev, was a member of the Communist Party of the Soviet Union until July 1991.

The New Azerbaijan Party's program highlights the main tasks which it states are aimed at strengthening the state independency, building the democratic, legal and secular state and ensuring the peaceful and prosperous life of the citizens. The principles of an independent state, lawfulness, creative progress, Azerbaijanism, civil solidarity and social justice have been declared as the basis of the party's ideology.

== Rights ==
The members of the party are ensured with the following rights:

- to elect and to be elected to authorities of the party;
- to take part freely in the determination of the party's policy and in the discussion of issues related to its activities;
- to participate in the events organized by the party
- to make suggestions for realizing the goals and tasks of the party;
- to use the party's support;
- to discuss and criticize freely all issues related to the party's policy as well as all activities of its bodies;
- to stop membership in the party or to leave the party.

== Organizational structure ==
- YAP implements its activity all over the territory of Azerbaijan.
- The initial party organization is based on the territorial principle.
- The decision to establish the initial party organization is adopted by foundation meeting with participation at least three members of the YAP and approved by the Executive Board of the district-city organizations. A party member can be registered only in the one party organization.
- The guiding body of the initial party organization is a general assembly. The general assembly is held at least once every three months. The assembly is available by participation of more than half of the members registered in the initial party organization. Decisions are approved by simple majority of votes.

== Congresses ==
- The 1st Congress of the party was held on 20–21 December 1999, with the participation of more than 2,000 members of the party from different regions of the country, as well as more than 30 foreign representatives.
- The 2nd Congress of the New Azerbaijan Party was held in Baku on 21 November 2001. Some amendments were made to the Charter. Ilham Aliyev was elected as a deputy chairman of the party. Heydar Aliyev delivered a speech at the congress. 1952 representatives participated at the II Congress.
- The 3rd Congress of the New Azerbaijan Party was held on 26 March 2005 in Baku with participation of more than 1800 members.
- The 4th Congress of the New Azerbaijan Party was held on 2 August 2008, in the Heydar Aliyev sports and concert complex with the participation of more than 600 members in Baku. The Congress decided to nominate Ilham Aliyev as a candidate for the presidential elections to be held on 15 October 2008.
- The 5th Congress of the New Azerbaijan Party was held at the Buta Palace in Baku on 7 June 2013. The congress decided to nominate Ilham Aliyev as a candidate for the presidential elections to be held on 9 October 2013.
- The 6th Congress of the New Azerbaijan Party was held on 8 February 2018 at the Heydar Aliyev Center in Baku. The congress decided to nominate Ilham Aliyev as a candidate for the presidential elections to be held on 11 April. Representatives of more than 700,000 members of the New Azerbaijan Party attended at the Congress.

== Election results ==
At the elections (5 November 2000 and 7 January 2001), the party won 62.3% of the popular vote and 75 out of 125 seats. Its candidate Ilham Aliyev was reported by the government to have won 76.84% of the popular vote in the 2003 presidential elections. Ilham Aliyev also won presidential elections of 2008, 2013 and 2018. At the 2005 parliamentary elections, it won 62 out of 125 seats. At the 2010 parliamentary elections, it won 72 out of 125 seats. In the 1 November 2015 parliamentary election, the New Azerbaijan Party won 70 out of 125 seats, thus losing two seats in the National Assembly since the last election.

=== Presidential elections ===
Election	Party candidate	Votes	%	Result
1993	Heydar Aliyev	3,919,923	98.83%	Elected ✓
1998	Heydar Aliyev	2,556,059	77.61%	Elected ✓
2003	Ilham Aliyev	1,860,346	76.84%	Elected ✓
2008	Ilham Aliyev	3,232,259	88.73%	Elected ✓
2013	Ilham Aliyev	3,126,113	84.54%	Elected ✓
2018	Ilham Aliyev	3,394,898	86.02%	Elected ✓
2024	Ilham Aliyev	4,567,458	92.12%	Elected ✓

=== National Assembly elections ===
Election	Leader	Votes	%	Seats	+/–	Position	Government
1995–1996	Heydar Aliyev	2,228,435	62.7	53 / 125	New	▲1st	In government
2000–2001	Heydar Aliyev	1,809,801	62.3	75 / 125	▲22	1st	Majority government
2005	Ilham Aliyev			56 / 125	▼19	1st	In government
2010	Ilham Aliyev	1,110,885	46.48	71 / 125	▲15	1st	Majority government
2015	Ilham Aliyev	1,340,765	47.20	69 / 125	▼2	1st	Majority government
2020	Ilham Aliyev	976,163	41.84	70 / 125	▲1	1st	Majority government
2024	Ilham Aliyev	1,200,134	50.41	68 / 125	▼2	1st	Majority government
