= Civic Unity Party (Azerbaijan) =

Azerbaijani political party

Civic Unity Party Vətəndaş Birliyi Partiyası
- Abbreviation: VBP
- Leader: Sabir Hacıyev
- Founder: Ayaz Mutallibov
- Founded: 1999
- Registered: 12 August 2004
- Dissolved: 22 May 2023
- Split from: ASDP
- PACE affiliation: Socialists, Democrats and Greens Group

The Civic Unity Party (Azerbaijani: Vətəndaş Birliyi Partiyası) was an Azerbaijani political party established in 1999 in Moscow by the former President of Azerbaijan Ayaz Mutallibov. After the 2000 parliamentary elections in Azerbaijan, the party split between into two fractions: one led by Ayaz Mutallibov and the other led by Igbal Agazade. The latter fraction later formed the Party of Hope (Azerbaijani: Ümid Partiyası).

In 2003, Mutallibov split from CUP, joining the Social Democratic Party of Azerbaijan as its chairman. From then on, CUP was led by Sabir Hajiyev and participated in 2005 parliamentary elections, gaining 1 out 125 seats in the National Assembly of Azerbaijan. Albeit nominally an opposition party, CUP officially supported the incumbent President Ilham Aliyev.

The party dissolved itself on 22 May 2023.
