= Democratic Reforms Party =

Azerbaijani political party

Democratic Reforms Party Demokratik İslahatlar Partiyası
- Abbreviation: DİP (Azerbaijani)
- Leader: Asim Mollazade
- Founder: Asim Mollazade
- Founded: 27 May 2005
- Registered: 12 August 2005
- Split from: Azerbaijani Popular Front Party
- Headquarters: Neftchilar Avenue 65, Sabail raion, Baku
- Membership: 1,000
- Ideology: Reformism
- Colours: Blue
- National Assembly: 1 / 125
- Municipalities: 35 / 15,156

Party flag

Website
- az.demreforms.az

The Democratic Reforms Party (Azerbaijani: Demokratik İslahatlar Partiyası) is an Azerbaijani political party established on May 27, 2005.

The party's first congress took place on July 4, 2005, where the party's program and memorandum were accepted, members of its Political Council and General Revision Committee were elected. Party's congress also elected Asim Mollazade, a member of the Parliament of Azerbaijan, as the party's first chairman. The following people became members of its Political Council:

1. Asim Mollazade
2. Rauf Talyshinsky
3. Ingilab Ahmedov
4. Nazim Abdullayev
5. Eduard Chernin
6. Elkhan Agamirzayev
7. Gulnara Mamedova
8. Murad Rahimov
9. Mardan Afandiyev
10. Eldar Jahangirov
11. Ilgar Huseynov

The members of the Central Revision Committee:

1. Chingiz Abdullayev
2. Roman Temnikov
3. Ilkin Hasanov

At the initiative of Asim Mollazade, the Chief Editor of popular "Echo" Newspaper, Rauf Talyshinsky, was appointed as Deputy Chairman for Political matters, Ingilab Ahmedov – Deputy Chairman for Economic matters, and Nazim Abdullayev, president of "NNN" Group of Companies, – Deputy Chairman for Entrepreneurship.

== Election results ==
=== National Assembly elections ===
Election	Leader	Votes	%	Seats	+/–	Position	Government
2005	Asim Mollazadə			1 / 125	New	▲8th	Opposition
2010	Asim Mollazadə	5,555	0.23	1 / 125	0	▼19th	Opposition
2015	Asim Mollazadə	21,044	0.74	1 / 125	0	▲8th	Opposition
2020	Asim Mollazadə	5,533	0.24	1 / 125	0	▼15th	Opposition
2024	Asim Mollazadə	10,698	0.45	1 / 125	0	▲12th	Opposition
