= Free Homeland Party (Azerbaijan) =

The Karabakh Liberation Organization (KLO) (Azerbaijani: Qarabağ Azadlıq Təşkilatı (QAT)) was an Azerbaijani organization created in Baku, Azerbaijan on January 28, 2000 with objective of "liberation of Nagorno-Karabakh". Led by Doctor of History, docent Akif Naghi, KLO represents cultural figures of Azerbaijan, former military soldiers, refugees and internally displaced persons (IDPs). On August 17, 2022 was established as a political party with the name Free Homeland Party.

== Election results ==
=== National Assembly elections ===
| Election | Leader | Votes | % | Seats | +/– | Position | Government |
|---|---|---|---|---|---|---|---|
| 2024 | Akif Nağı | 4,886 | 0.21 | 0 / 125 | New | ▲17th | Extra-parliamentary |
