= Modern Musavat Party =

Center-left political party in Azerbaijan

Modern Equality Party Müasir Müsavat Partiyası
- Leader: Hafiz Haciyev
- Founded: 2001
- Registered: 8 May 2002
- Split from: Musavat
- Headquarters: Baku, Azerbaijan
- Membership: 5,000+ (2023)
- Ideology: Social liberalism
- Political position: Centre-left
- Colours: Yellow, blue

The Modern Equality Party (Azerbaijani: Müasir Müsavat Partiyası) is a political party in Azerbaijan.

Its candidate Hafiz Haciyev won 0.3% of the popular vote in the 15 October 2003 presidential elections. During a live debate on TV, Haciyev clashed with Fuad Mustafayev, a representative of the Azerbaijani Popular Front Party who threw his full water glass into Haciyev's face, the latter reacted throwing his water glass against Mustafayev.

In one occasion Haciyev accused Musavat leader Isa Gambar of being a KGB agent, ANIP leader Etibar Mamedov of collaborating with Armenians, and Popular Front leader Ali Kerimli of "losing his manhood" while in jail.

Elections were held on October 15, 2008, in which Ilham Aliyev won with 88.6% of the vote. None of the opposition parties, including the Modern Equality Party garnered more than 3% of the vote. Hafiz Hajiyev of Modern Equality received 0.65% of the vote.

In 2013 Hafiz Haciyev, leader of the party, offered a reward of 10,000 manats ($12,700) for the ear of novelist Akram Aylisli. The Interior Ministry said they would investigate the statement by Haciyev, who is pro-government. Human Rights Watch condemned the threat.

On 11 April, 2018 presidential elections were held in Azerbaijan. Eight candidates participated, but it was clear from the outset that the incumbent president Ilham Aliyev of the New Azerbaijan Party would win. The following chart displays the results of the election:

Candidate	Party	Number of Votes	Percentage of total vote
Ilham Aliyev	New Azerbaijan Party	3,394,898	86.02
Zahid Oruj	Independent	122,956	3.12
Sardar Mammado	Azerbaijan Democratic Party	119,621	3.03
Gudrat Hasanguliyev	Whole Azerbaijan Popular Front Party	119,311	3.02
Hafiz Hajiyev	Modern Equality Party	59,924	1.52
Araz Alizade	Social Democratic Party	54,533	1.38
Faraj Guliyev	National Revival Movement Party	45,967	1.17
Razi Nurullayev	Independent	29,229	0.74

== Election results ==
=== Presidential elections ===
Election	Party candidate	Votes	%	Result
2003	Hafiz Hajiyev	23,771	0.65%	Lost ✗
2013	Hafiz Hajiyev	24,461	0.66%	Lost ✗
2018	Hafiz Hajiyev	59,924	1.52%	Lost ✗

=== National Assembly elections ===
Election	Leader	Votes	%	Seats	+/–	Position	Government
2020	Hafiz Haciyev	6,844	0.29	0 / 125	New	▲11th	Extra-parliamentary
2024	Hafiz Haciyev	2,599	0.11	0 / 125	0	▼20th	Extra-parliamentary
