= 2024 Azerbaijani presidential election =

- 7 February 2024
- Registered: 6,514,222 (▲21.49%)
- Turnout: 76.26% (▲2.02pp)
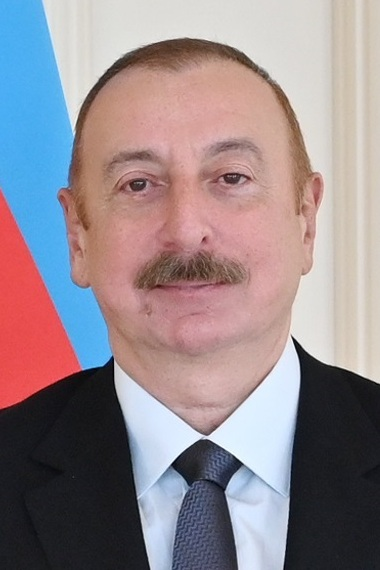

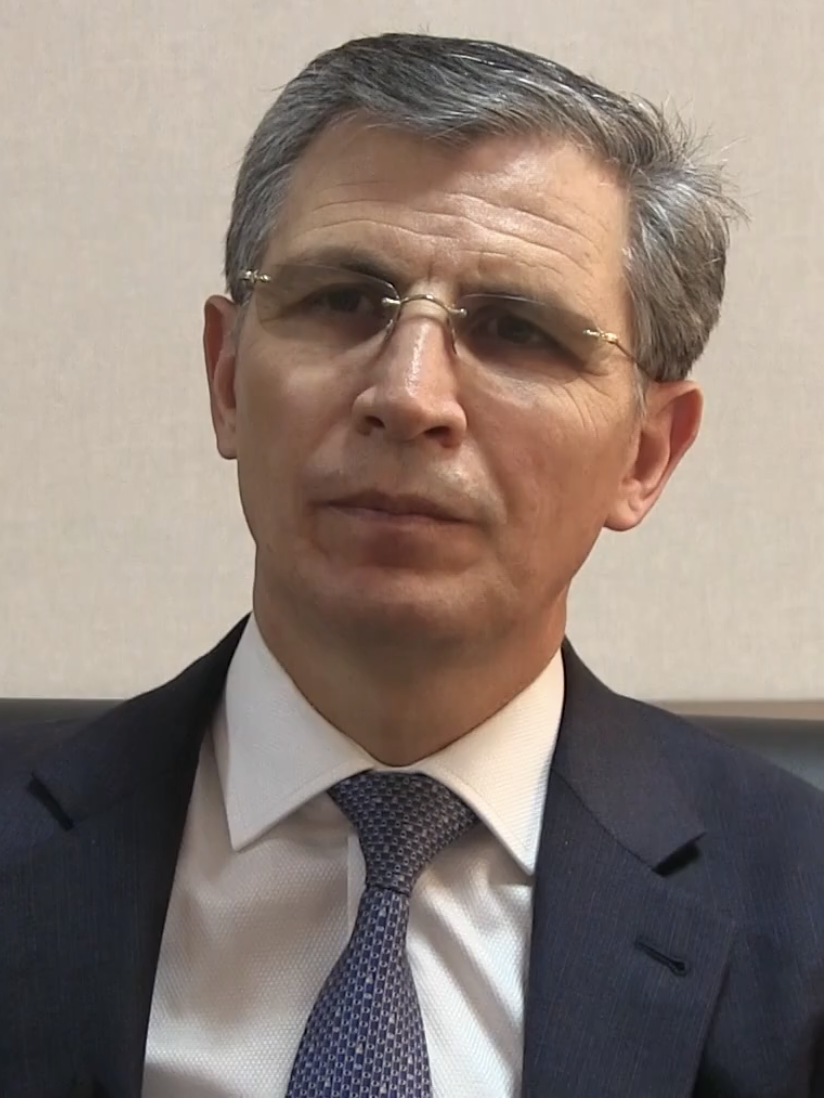
| Nominee | Ilham Aliyev | Zahid Oruj |
| Party | New Azerbaijan | Independent |
| Running mate | Mehriban Aliyeva |
| Popular vote | 4,567,458 | 107,632 |
| Percentage | 92.12% | 2.17% |
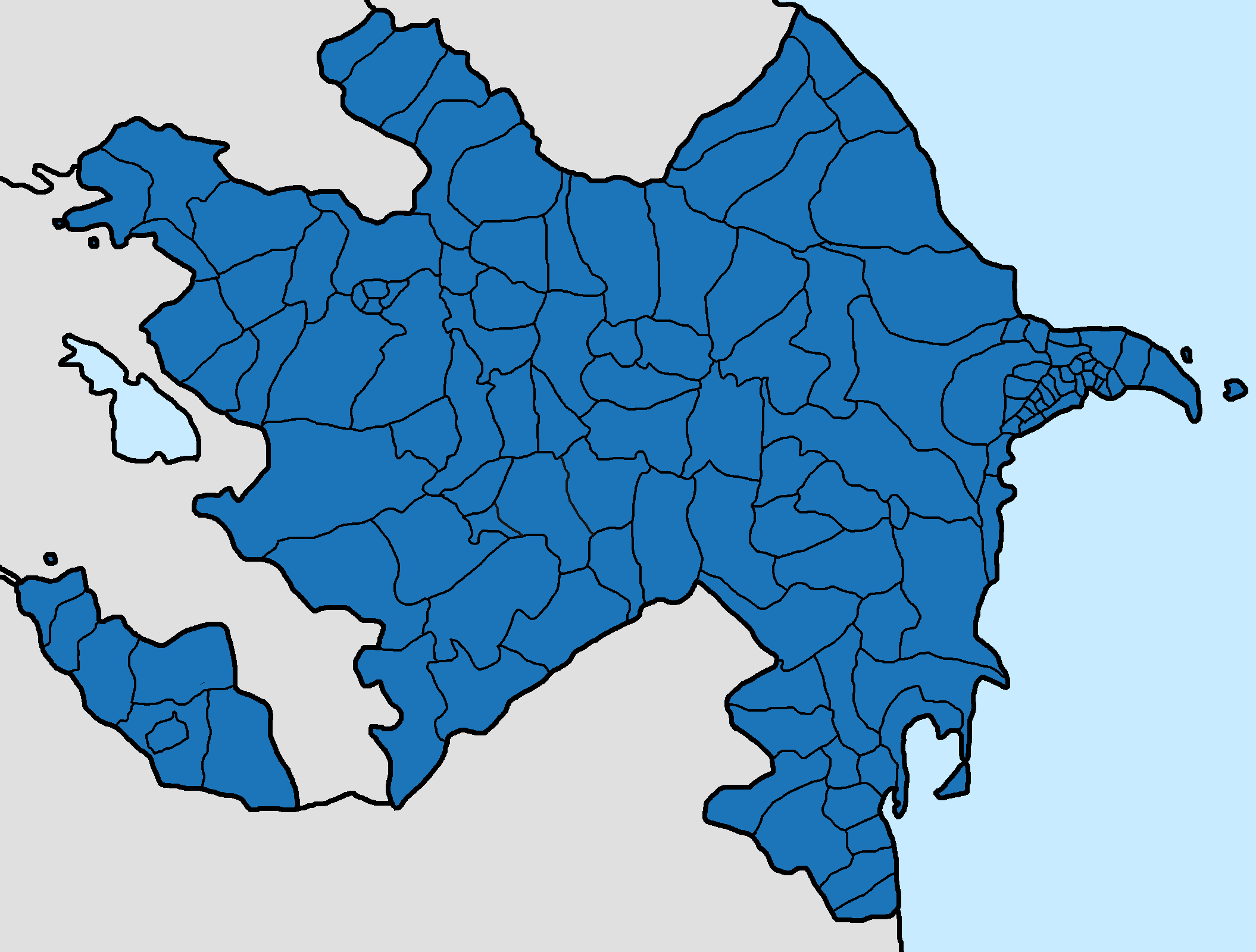
- Result by constituency Ilham Aliyev
President before election
Ilham Aliyev
New Azerbaijan
Elected President
Ilham Aliyev
New Azerbaijan

Presidential elections were held in Azerbaijan on 7 February 2024. Incumbent president Ilham Aliyev, who has held office since 2003, won a fifth consecutive term with over 92% of the vote, defeating his closest runner-up Zahid Oruj, who obtained just 2% of the vote.

Originally planned for October 2025, President Aliyev called for a snap election in December 2023 following the victorious Azerbaijani offensive in Nagorno-Karabakh. This offensive led to the end of the Republic of Artsakh, which was an Armenian-led breakaway state, and Azerbaijan gaining full control over the disputed Nagorno-Karabakh region. The election is informally known as the "Victory Election" (Azerbaijani: Zəfər seçkisi) due to the successful military operation. It marks the third snap election in Azerbaijan's history and the first to be held in winter season.

The election took place in an authoritarian context where the opposition and independent media were noted to be repressed. The two main opposition parties, Musavat and Popular Front, announced that they would not field candidates for the election and urged voters to stay home, citing the undemocratic nature of the election. Furthermore, several candidates featured on the ballot had previously expressed public admiration for Aliyev, resulting in the absence of opposition contenders amidst the crackdown on independent media and journalists.

In addition to the aftermath of the Nagorno-Karabakh conflict and its future implications, the election campaign unfolded against a backdrop of broader geopolitical tensions in the region. This included competition between regional powers and efforts to assert Azerbaijan's influence in the South Caucasus. Domestic issues such as economic stagnation, rising social inequalities, and concerns about democratic governance were also prominent themes in the election discourse. The Organization for Security and Co-operation in Europe highlighted concerns such as "secrecy of the vote, absence of measures against multiple voting, and signs of ballot stuffing," prompting doubts about the integrity of the ballot counting and reporting process. Observers noted that although election preparations were executed efficiently and competently, genuine pluralism was lacking, with critical viewpoints consistently suppressed.

== Background ==
The previous 2018 presidential election was held months ahead of schedule which saw the re-election of long-time authoritarian president Ilham Aliyev, in power since 2003, securing a fourth consecutive term in office after obtaining 86% of the vote. The election was boycotted by the Azerbaijani opposition and criticized for its conduct and early schedule amid allegations of irregularities and electoral fraud.

President Aliyev's fourth presidential term was initially marked by a series of socioeconomic reforms, where he issued decrees addressing burdensome credit loans, providing compensation to the families of military veterans, and increasing student stipends, as well as issuing mass pardons to several political prisoners. He also made an effort attempt at diversifying the oil-dependent Azerbaijani economy. In late 2019, the National Assembly dissolved itself, which triggered the February 2020 parliamentary election, with the move being viewed as Aliyev's possible preparation for an order of succession, where he would eventually hand over presidency to his wife, First Vice President Mehriban Aliyeva, as a way to ensure the Aliyev family's dynastic rule over Azerbaijan. The parliamentary election campaign, initially offering a glimmer of political change, nevertheless saw Aliyev's ruling New Azerbaijan Party retaining a majority of deputy seats. From 2020, Aliyev endured the outbreak of COVID-19 pandemic in Azerbaijan, where a series of controversial anti-lockdown laws were introduced that allowed for the Azerbaijani government to crackdown on political opposition and silence anti-government critics over the country's response to the pandemic, which Aliyev referred to as a "fifth column" attempting to "destroy Azerbaijan". The Azerbaijani government also introduced a series of anti-crisis packages that were aimed at relieving the economic impact caused by the coronavirus pandemic, to which the emergency aid was later criticized for allegedly having citizens struggling to obtain it.

=== Nagorno-Karabakh and the 2023 Azerbaijani offensive ===
The Nagorno-Karabakh region has served as an epicenter of the decades-long conflict between Azerbaijan and Armenia. Since 1994 much of Nagorno-Karabakh, internationally recognized as part of Azerbaijan, was de-facto under control by the ethnic Armenian-led breakaway state Republic of Artsakh, with periods of occurring border skirmishes occurring in the 2010s. In July 2020, border clashes took place between Armenian and Azerbaijani forces, sparking massive pro-war protests in Azerbaijan which became increasingly grew following the deaths of military officers Polad Hashimov and Ilgar Mirzayev. The demonstrations in Baku, leading to the storming of the Parliament building and clashes with the security forces, had profound impact on Azerbaijan's foreign policy as its believed to have been one of the causing factors that led to the following outbreak of the Second Nagorno-Karabakh War in September 2020. The war lasted for approximately 44 days and resulted in an Azerbaijani victory, reclaiming control of the newly-captured territories and Armenian-occupied territories surrounding Nagorno-Karabakh in the aftermath of November 2020 ceasefire agreement signed by Armenia, Azerbaijan, and Russia.

Post-war stability within the Nagorno-Karabakh region was relatively short-lived, as the Armenia–Azerbaijan border crisis began in 2021. From December 2022, Azerbaijan enforced a blockade of Nagorno-Karabakh, sparking a humanitarian crisis in Artsakh as the region grappled with the shortages of medication, food and fuel. In September 2023, Azerbaijan launched a large-scale military offensive into Nagorno-Karabakh which lasted for a day, leading to the immediate surrender of the remaining Artsakhi forces, which effectively ended the existence of the Republic of Artsakh and resulted in the mass exodus of Nagorno-Karabakh Armenians.

=== Calling for snap election ===
Article 178 of the Election Code of Azerbaijan stipulates that the presidential election must be held every third Wednesday of October of the last year of the President’s term of office. The 2016 constitutional referendum previously extended the presidential term from five to seven years, with Aliyev being subsequently re-elected for a seven-year term in 2018 following the amendments to the Constitution of Azerbaijan, thus making the presidential election originally set to take place on 15 October 2025.

Article 101 §1 of the Constitution of Azerbaijan allows for the President to legally call a snap election. In accordance with Article 179 §2 of the Election Code of Azerbaijan, the date of the presidential elections shall be determined within a week of the call by the Central Election Commission (CEC). The election must be on a Wednesday and be conducted within a 3 month period after the date determination by the CEC. On 7 December 2023, President Ilham Aliyev signed a decree in setting Wednesday, 7 February 2024, as a date for an early presidential election to be held. In addition, the election day in Azerbaijan would be a public holiday.

Given without the official explanation for Aliyev's decision, it was speculated by Mehmood Ul Hassan Khan during an interview with Azernews that the original election date for autumn 2025 would have coincided with the already scheduled parliamentary elections for that same timeframe, which might could have potentially caused "a bit of distress" among Azerbaijani voters and that a snap election for president in February 2024 would look "more convenient from a time perspective." Other analysts suggested the reasoning factor behind an early presidential election was due to Aliyev's attempt to take advantage of his high popularity following Azerbaijani's successful seizure of Nagorno-Karabakh. The timing of election was also noted by Associated Press to have coincided ahead of the 2024 Russian presidential election, for which the alleged reason was due to attempts by Aliyev to minimize Russia's influence on the Azerbaijani election. Opposition leader Ali Karimli assessed that a snap presidential election indicated Aliyev's desire to hold polls "in isolation from the democratic world" and fear of a change in the current "minimal political competition", where he speculated that Aliyev wanted to secure another seven-year presidential term before a potential Russian defeat in the Russo-Ukrainian War which could according to his theory "upend the regional geopolitical situation to authoritarians' disfavor." Musavat party chairman Arif Hajili criticized the announcement of a snap presidential election, stating that holding an early vote hinders political competition and that it is problematic for the election campaign. In a following subsequent statement, the Musavat party claimed that the election date in winter will lead to a low voter turnout, accusing Azerbaijani authorities of turning the presidential election into "a formal procedure".

== Electoral system ==
The President of Azerbaijan is elected for a seven-year term from universal, direct and equal suffrage with a personal and secret ballot. Using the two-round system; if no candidate receives a majority of the vote in the first round, a run-off vote is held between the top two candidates who garnered the most votes in the first round. Under a case of the war, the presidential term must be extended until the end of military operation, for which the decision on this matter must be adopted by the Constitutional Court of the Republic of Azerbaijan on the basis of the application of the state body organizing elections (referendum).

== Timetable ==
The Central Election Commission (CEC) on 9 December 2023 approved the official calendar plan for the 2024 election as follows.

Key Dates
| Date | Event |
|---|---|
| 9 December 2023 | Nomination process of candidates begin. |
| 19 December 2023 – 8 January 2024, 18:00 UTC+4 | Collecting signatures in support of presidential nominees. |
| 15 January–6 February 2024, 08:00 UTC+4 | Pre-election campaigning. |
| 28 January 2024 | Deadline for the accreditation of election observers. |
| 2 February 2024 | Deadline for the submission of applications for election observation in the premises of electoral precinct to the district election commission. |
| 7 February 2024 | Election day, voting held from 08:00 to 19:00 UTC+4. |
| Evening, 7 February 2024 | Publication of the information about the election results in the protocols of precinct and district election commissions. |
| By 19:00 UTC+4, 8 February 2024 | Precinct election commissions submit the first copies of the protocols on the results of the elections to the district election commissions. |
| 9 February 2024 | Deadline for district election commissions requiring to submit the first copies of protocols on the results of voting in the district to the CEC, for which after all protocols received from the districts the CEC must immediately announce the primary generalized election results. |
| 17 February 2024 | Deadline for the Constitutional Court to verify and approve the election results. |

== Candidates ==
A citizen of the Republic of Azerbaijan, who has lived permanently in the territory of the Azerbaijan for more than 10 years, has the right to participate in elections, has not been convicted of a serious crime, has no obligations to other states, has a higher education, and does not have dual citizenship can be elected as President.

=== Registered ===
| Candidate name and age, political party | Political office(s) | Details | Registration date |
|---|---|---|---|
| Ilham Aliyev (62); New Azerbaijan Party | President of Azerbaijan (2003–present); Chairman of the New Azerbaijan Party (2005–present); Prime Minister of Azerbaijan (2003) | The New Azerbaijan Party submitted the documents on the presidential nomination of Ilham Aliyev to the CEC on 17 December 2023. | 30 December 2023 |
| Fuad Aliyev (53); Independent | Chairman of the Liberal Democratic Party of Azerbaijan (2001–2023) | Previously a candidate in the 2008 presidential election. | 3 January 2024 |
| Zahid Oruj (52); Independent | Member of the National Assembly (2003–present) | A pro-Aliyev member of parliament. He was a presidential candidate previously in the 2018 and 2013 elections, and gave an interview in support of Ilham Aliyev on 8 December 2023. Despite this, he later announced his bid to participate in the election and applied his presidential candidacy to the CEC on 17 December. | 6 January 2024 |
| Fazil Mustafa (58); Great Order Party | Member of the National Assembly for the 26th Sabunchu constituency (2005–present) | On 17 December 2023, the documents on Mustafa's nomination by the Great Order Party in the election were submitted to the CEC. | 9 January 2024 |
| Elşad Musayev (60); Great Azerbaijan Party | Chairman of the Great Azerbaijan Party (2003–present) | Chairman of the Great Azerbaijan Party (GAP) which was re-registered in 2023. Previously ran in the 2003 presidential election. | 9 January 2024 |

=== Nominations ===
After the meeting of the Central Election Commission (CEC) held on 8 December 2023, in a statement made by the secretary of the CEC, Arife Muhtarova, candidates willing to participate in the 2024 presidential election must submit the necessary documents to the commission starting from 10 December. She noted that the acceptance of documents should continue until 8 January 2024, and the propaganda work should continue until 6 February 2024 at 18:00. In order to participate as an observer, citizens should apply to the commission by 28 January 2024.

==== New Azerbaijan Party ====
On 12 December 2023, deputy chairman of New Azerbaijan Party (YAP) and chairman of the YAP central office, Tahir Budaqov, confirmed that Ilham Aliyev would be the presidential nominee for YAP, noting that the final decision will be made at the meeting of the party's board of directors, as the nomination of candidates is made under the authority of the board of directors in accordance with the decision taken at the previous YAP congress.

At the meeting of the YAP board of directors on 15 December 2023, Aliyev was officially nominated for presidency under the party's decision. In addition, Tahir Budagov, deputy chairman of YAP – head of the central office and Ali Ahmadov, deputy chairman of YAP, were appointed as authorized party representatives for the election with Ahliman Taghiyev, deputy head of the central office, being appointed as authorized representative for financial issues.

==== Great Order Party ====
According to the decision taken at the meeting of the supreme assembly of the Great Order Party (BQP) on 16 December 2023, party chairman Fazil Mustafa, candidate in the 2008 election, was nominated for the presidency by the BQP.

==== Great Azerbaijan Party ====
On 17 December 2023, the decision of the political council of the Great Azerbaijan Party (BAP) regarding the elections was announced to the press. Thus, the BAP nominated party chairman Elşad Musayev as a presidential candidate for the elections.

==== Whole Azerbaijan Popular Front Party ====
On 18 December 2023, Qüdrat Hasanquliyev, the chairman of the Whole Azerbaijan Popular Front Party (BAXCP), who was a candidate for the presidency in the 2003 elections, received presidential nomination by BAXCP.

==== Independents ====
Zahid Oruj
On 16 December 2023, Zahid Oruj, who ran in the 2018 and 2013 presidential elections announced his interest to take part in the 2024 election as an independent candidate.

Fuad Aliyev
Fuad Aliyev, the chairman of the former Liberal Democratic Party of Azerbaijan and the chairman of the Public Union for the Protection of Civil Rights, nominated himself for presidency on 18 December 2023. Those who support him established the "Citizen Union" Election Headquarters which was chaired by Khazar Teyyublu.

== Endorsements ==
Ilham Aliyev

Notable individuals

- Hurru Aliyev, nephew of Abulfaz Elchibey, chairman of Beyaz Movement
- Mübariz Mansimov, businessman, president of "Palmaly" Group of Companies
- Rais Rasulzade, honored artist, grandson of Mahammad Amin Rasulzade
- Javanshir Guliyev, composer, honored artist
- Nadir Vekiloğlu, son of Mustafa bey Vakilov
- Adil Geybulla, professor, doctor, and politician
- Flora Karimova, singer, people's artist
- Rasul Guliyev, former Speaker of the National Assembly of Azerbaijan
- Rasim Balayev, actor, people's artist, chairman of the Union of Cinematographers of Azerbaijan
- Elchin Shikhly, journalist, chairman of the Union of Journalists of Azerbaijan, son of Ismail Shikhly
- Firudin Jalilov, former Deputy Prime Minister and former minister
- Akif Islamzade, singer, son of Sara Gadimova

Political parties

- New Azerbaijan Party
- Motherland Party
- Free Homeland Party
- Azerbaijan Hope Party
- Future Azerbaijan Party
- Right Justice Party
- Modern Musavat Party
- Unity Party

International and local organizations

- Azerbaijan Trade Unions Confederation
- Azerbaijan Red Crescent Society
- Union of Azerbaijani Writers
- Council of Elders
- Western Azerbaijani Community

== Campaign ==
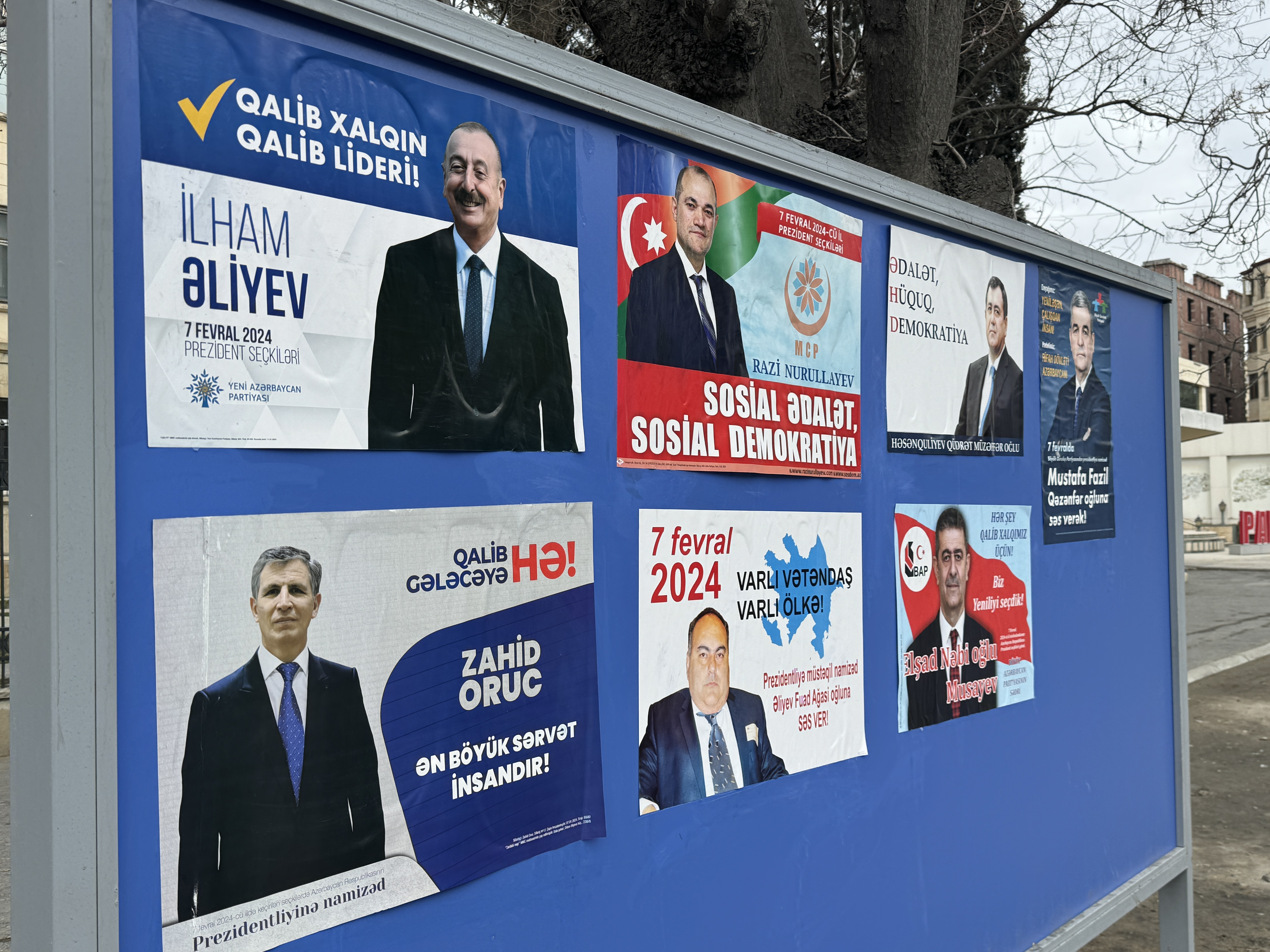
Campaign flyers on display board

The Central Election Commission has allocated a total of 278 permanent meeting places, 139 of which are open and 139 are closed, for the pre-election campaign of presidential candidates.

=== Elşad Musayev ===
With the announcement of his campaign, Great Azerbaijan Party presidential nominee Musayev began to use his campaign slogan "Everything is for the victorious people!" (Azerbaijani: Hər şey qalib xalq üçün!). Musayev held a meeting with voters in Gobustan District on 17 January 2024.

=== Fazil Mustafa ===
Fazil Mustafa, candidate for the Great Order Party, campaigned under the slogan "Our support: A renewing, hardworking person! Our goal: welfare state Azerbaijan" (Azerbaijani: Dayağımız: Yeniləşən, çalışqan insan! Hədəfimiz: rifah dövləti Azərbaycan). Mustafa's campaign placed a significant focus on education, but also addressed other issues such as international politics, social concerns, internal governance, and reform. The campaign committed itself to offer distinct perspectives on each issue and scheduled meetings across different regions to engage with voters directly.

On 17 January 2024, Mustafa held a meeting with voters in his constituency of Sabunçu raion. From there, he was accompanied by Ogtay Gasimov, who served as assistant to former president Abulfaz Elchibey.

=== Fuad Aliyev ===
As an independent presidential candidate, Fuad campaigned in a motto "Rich citizen, rich country" (Azerbaijani: Varlı vətəndaş, varlı ölkə). To kickoff his campaign, Fuad held a meeting with voters in the settlement of Binə on 16 January 2024. In a press statement, Fuad exclaimed that the election would signify the dawn of a new era in Azerbaijan's history and urged citizens to inscribe "golden chapters" in the annals of the nation, pledging to safeguard Azerbaijan's legacy for future generations.

=== Ilham Aliyev ===
The New Azerbaijan Party (YAP) announced its election slogan with the launch of the pre-election campaign. Ilham Aliyev, being the official presidential candidate for YAP, participate in the election under a campaign motto "The victorious leader of the victorious people!" (Azerbaijani: Qalib xalqın qalib lideri!).

Aliyev's election program outlined what it called a multifaceted agenda aimed at advancing Azerbaijan's progress across various domains. It highlighted achievements in social welfare, economic growth, national security, and foreign relations, as well as significant improvements in citizens' well-being, economic independence, and defense capabilities under his leadership.

=== Qüdrat Hasanquliyev ===
On 21 December 2023, presidential candidate Qüdrat Hasanguliyev (Whole Azerbaijan Popular Front Party) announced several provisions from his pre-election campaign platform to the press. If elected as president, Hasanguliyev pledged to change Azerbaijan's official name to the "Northern Azerbaijan Republic" through a constitutional referendum, combine the state bodies of the Minister of Justice and the Prosecutor General into the State Investigative Committee, divide the country into 15 administrative units and establish 31-member assemblies which will be formed by the votes of the residents of those administrative units, increasing workers' salaries, reduce the Azerbaijani military service period to six months, and introduce a cash payment system for exemption from premiums, as well as establish "child allowance" payments. Hasanguliyev's platforms also included transitioning to a parliamentary republic within nine months, holding the 2025 parliamentary elections under proportional representation, and establishing a Government of National Unity until the new elections. He also reducing presidential powers, shortening the presidential term to five years, and transferring the power to elect the head of state to parliament. His proposals also included restructuring regional administrative units, declaring the Nakhchivan Autonomous Republic as an autonomous administrative unit and abolishing the Constitutional Court. Hasanguliyev also announced plans for metro and tramway expansions, high-speed rail connections, and privatization initiatives.

Canvassing under his election slogan "Justice, Law, Democracy" (Azerbaijani: Ədalət, Hüquq, Demokratiya), Hasanguliyev held a meeting with voters in Sumgait on 17 January 2024.

=== Razi Nurullayev ===
Presidential candidate Razi Nurullayev for the National Front Party (MCP) emphasized that his party's ideology is social democracy, thus describing himself as a "social democratic politician", outlying that his election program is mainly related to the issue of social security.

Participating as the MCP chairman, Nurullayev announced his campaign slogan "Social justice, social democracy!" (Azerbaijani: Sosial ədalət, sosial demokratiya!). From there, he appealed to the supporters through his social media. Nurullayev began his electoral campaign in Imishli District, where he was born and elected as deputy.

=== Zahid Oruj ===
On 9 January 2024, Zahid Oruj's campaign headquarters announced his election platform titled 4th Republic — 100 years of Azerbaijan's victory (Azerbaijani: 4-cü Respublika — Azərbaycanın qalib 100 ili).

With the launch of his pre-election campaign, Oruj announced his electoral slogan: "YES to the future of victory!" (Azerbaijani: Qalib gələcəyə HƏ!). He also wrote "The 4th Republic: The Victorious Hundred Years of Azerbaijan!" (Azerbaijani: 4-cü Respublika: Azərbaycanın Qalib Yüz İli!), "The greatest wealth is Human!" by announcing that he will also use foreign exchange. Running as an independent, Oruj called on Azerbaijani voters to "stand above the opposition-power polarization" and actively participate in building a new country.

On 17 January 2024, Oruj's authorized representative, Aziz Alibeyli, held a meeting with voters in Barda District, a constituency in which Oruj himself represents as a deputy.

== Debates ==
2024 Azerbaijani presidential election debates
| Date | Organiser | Moderator | P Candidate was present R Representative attended A Both candidate and representative were absent | | | | | | | Notes |
| Date | Organiser | Moderator | Zahid Oruj | Fazil Mustafa | Ilham Aliyev | Elşad Musayev | Qüdrat Hasanquliyev | Razi Nurullayev | Fuad Aliyev | Notes |
|---|---|---|---|---|---|---|---|---|---|---|
| 15 January; 21:00 UTC+4 | İctimai Television | Murad Hüseynov | P | P | R | P | R | P | P | |
| 17 January; 21:00 UTC+4 | İctimai Television | Murad Hüseynov | P | P | R | P | P | P | P | |
| 19 January; 21:00 UTC+4 | İctimai Television | Murad Hüseynov | P | P | R | P | P | P | P | |
| 22 January; 21:00 UTC+4 | İctimai Television | Murad Hüseynov | P | P | R | P | P | P | P | |
| 24 January; 21:00 UTC+4 | İctimai Television | Murad Hüseynov | P | P | R | P | P | P | P | |
| 26 January; 21:00 UTC+4 | İctimai Television | Murad Hüseynov | P | P | R | P | P | P | P | |
| 29 January; 21:00 UTC+4 | İctimai Television | Murad Hüseynov | P | P | R | P | P | P | P | |
| 31 January; 21:00 UTC+4 | İctimai Television | Murad Hüseynov | P | P | R | P | P | P | P | |
| 2 February; 21:00 UTC+4 | İctimai Television | Murad Hüseynov | P | P | R | P | P | P | P | |
| 5 February; 21:00 UTC+4 | İctimai Television | Murad Hüseynov | P | P | R | P | P | P | P | |

== Observation ==
On 29 December 2023, the Ministry of Foreign Affairs reported that it had sent invitations to the OSCE Office for Democratic Institutions and Human Rights (ODIHR), Commonwealth of Independent States (CIS), Organization of Turkic States, Organisation of Islamic Cooperation, Shanghai Cooperation Organization, Non-Aligned Movement Youth Organization, and the GUAM Organization for Democracy and Economic Development to observe elections.

Secretary General of the Commonwealth of Independent States (CIS), Sergey Lebedev, announced plans on 13 December 2023 in sending CIS election observers to Azerbaijan.

A long-term mission of the Office for Democratic Institutions and Human Rights (ODIHR) under the Organization for Security and Co-operation in Europe (OSCE) consisting of 26 people will observe the 2024 presidential election. The institution has sent a request to the OSCE participating countries regarding the provision of a short-term observation mission consisting of 250 people, with Eoghan Murphy being appointed as the head of the observation mission.

The Dilara Aliyeva Protection of Women's Rights Public Union chaired by Novella Jafaroglu, the Human Rights and Rule of Law Protection Public Union chaired by Saida Gojamanli, and the Azerbaijani branch of the Office of the United Nations High Commissioner for Human Rights chaired by Saadat Bananyarli established the "My Voice" Election Monitoring Coalition to monitor the polls.

At the meeting of the Central Election Commission (CEC) held on 6 January 2024, it was announced by CEC chairman Mazahir Panahov that 72 international observers from 19 countries applied to observe the presidential elections and all of them were welcomed. According to him, the OSCE Office for Democratic Institutions and Human Rights will send 37 observers to the presidential elections, the CIS Parliamentary Assembly 17, the Republic of Turkey 5, and the CIS 9 observers. He also stated that the observation mission led by the chairman of the Central Election Commission of Georgia will monitor the election. In addition, 228 local observers have been accredited in the CEC. 92 of them are on their own initiative, 10 are NGO representatives, and 126 are New Azerbaijan Party observers with special permission.

On 9 January 2024, 8 international organizations and 78 international observers representing 21 countries were accredited. In addition, 242 local observers are registered in the CEC, and 14,281 in the district election commissions.

Along with the "My Vote" Election Monitoring Coalition, the "Democratic Election Center" Public Union chaired by Gorkhmaz Ibrahimli, the "Independent Law Center" Public Union chaired by Aydın Karimli and the "Society Development Center" Public Union chaired by Ahmet Abbasbeyli joined together to form the Civil Society Monitoring Coalition. The coalition will conduct the monitoring process for 63 constituencies. Along with this coalition, the "Oilmen's Rights Protection Organization" Public Union chaired by Mirvari Kahramanli, the "For Civil Society" Public Union chaired by Rafiq Ismayil and the "Multimedia Information Systems and Technologies Center" Public Union chaired by Osman Gunduz joined together to form the Election Observation and Analysis Group Coalition. This coalition will observe the elections with more than 500 representatives. In addition to the observation coalitions, the Azerbaijan National NGO Forum, the International Eurasian Press Fund, the Public Association of the Disabled, Veterans and Martyrs' Families of the Azerbaijan Karabakh War, the Organization of War, Labor and Armed Forces Veterans, the Azerbaijan Student Youth Organization, the Union of Voluntary Organizations of Azerbaijan, and the National Council of Youth Organizations of the Republic of Azerbaijan will observe the elections.

As of 13 January 2024, the CEC had accredited over 20,500 observers, with 18,359 registered in district election commissions. By 18 January, the total number of accredited observers had risen to 25,841, including 153 international observers. Of these, 22,856 were accredited to observe specific districts, with 18,359 registered in district election commissions. On 29 January, Mazahir Panahov announced that the number of international observers had reached 800. By 31 January, Panahov stated that the total number of registered observers exceeded 85,000.

On 16 January 2024, the European Parliament issued joint statement that it would refrain from observing or commenting on the Azerbaijani presidential election and its outcomes, noting that any commentary on the election made by individual members will be done on their own accord and will not be representative of the European Parliament.

The GUAM Organization for Democracy and Economic Development's observation mission will monitor the upcoming presidential election in Azerbaijan, to which its delegation consists of five members, including GUAM Secretary-General Altay Efendiev, Ukrainian Verkhovna Rada deputies Sviatoslav Yurash and Mikhail Papiyev, Georgian deputy David Mamashvili, and Timoraz Kiladze, the program coordinator of the GUAM Cathedral.

=== Post-election analysis ===
Following the vote, OSCE monitors told a news conference in Baku that the election was “not competitive” and “was held in a restrictive environment”, adding that “recent arrests of critical journalists have hindered the media from operating freely”. It also noted “issues of secrecy of the vote, a lack of safeguards against multiple voting, indications of ballot stuffing", and raised “serious questions about whether ballots were counted and reported honestly".

== Conduct ==
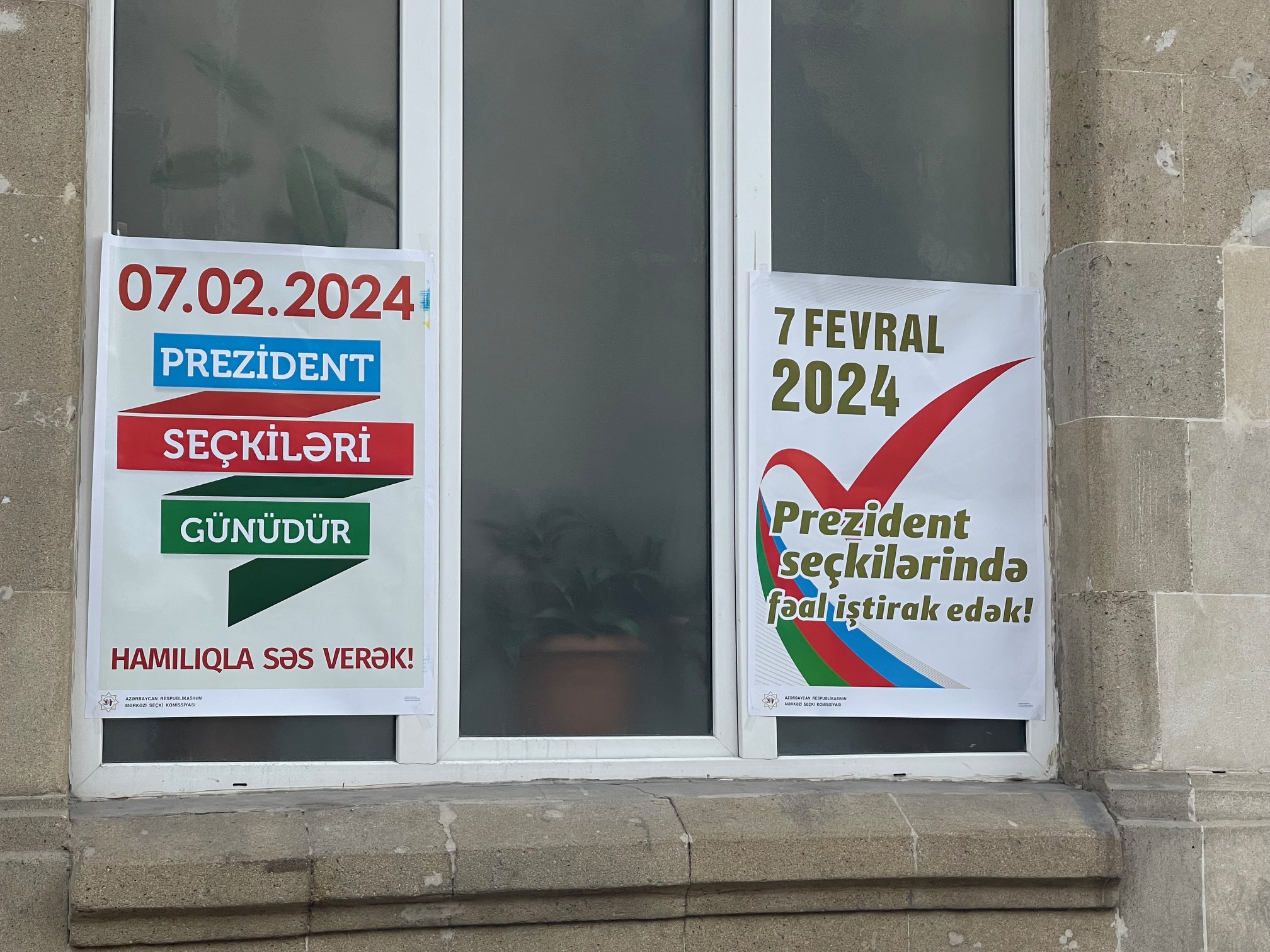
Public poster promoting the presidential election

A meeting of the Central Election Commission (CEC) was held on 8 December 2023, where the decision in holding a snap election was approved with a working group being established and CEC member Etibar Guliyev being appointed as the chairman of the group.

=== Electoral districts ===
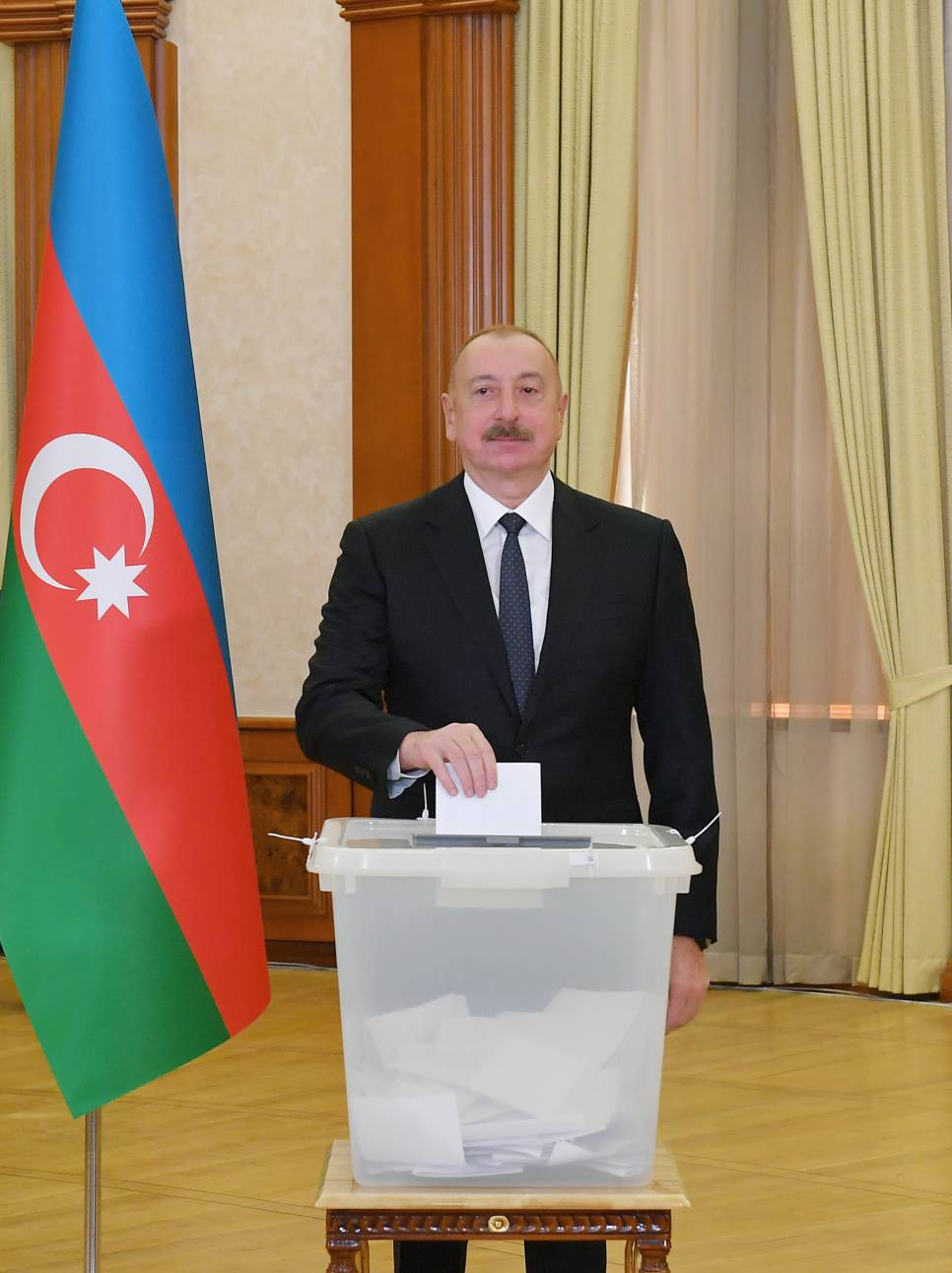
President Ilham Aliyev casting his vote in Khankendi

According to the information provided by the CEC on 19 September 2023, electoral districts in Azerbaijan were reorganized whilst taking into account the norm of voter representation.

With the Azerbaijani takeover of Nagorno-Karabakh from the Republic of Artsakh, the 2024 election was held in all of Azerbaijan's recognized territory the first time, with 20,000 voters taking part in the vote in the polling stations in the previously-occupied Nagorno-Karabakh territories. During the CEC meeting on 16 December 2023, chairman Mazahir Panahov announced that elections would be held in the "liberated" city of Khankendi (formerly Stepanakert) for the first time under Azerbaijani control and that a newly-formed polling station will be located in the administrative building of the former Nagorno-Karabakh Autonomous Province Committee of the Communist Party of Azerbaijan. According to the information provided, 26 polling stations will be created in nine constituencies covering the regions of Nagorno-Karabakh taken by Azerbaijan. On election day, both Aliyev and his wife and running-mate Mehriban cast their votes in Khankendi.

=== Funding ===
Approximately 110.9 million manats (0.3%) from the Azerbaijani government budget have been allocated for the expenses of holding elections and statistical measures, as stated in the Law "On the 2024 State Budget of the Republic of Azerbaijan".

=== Voter listing ===
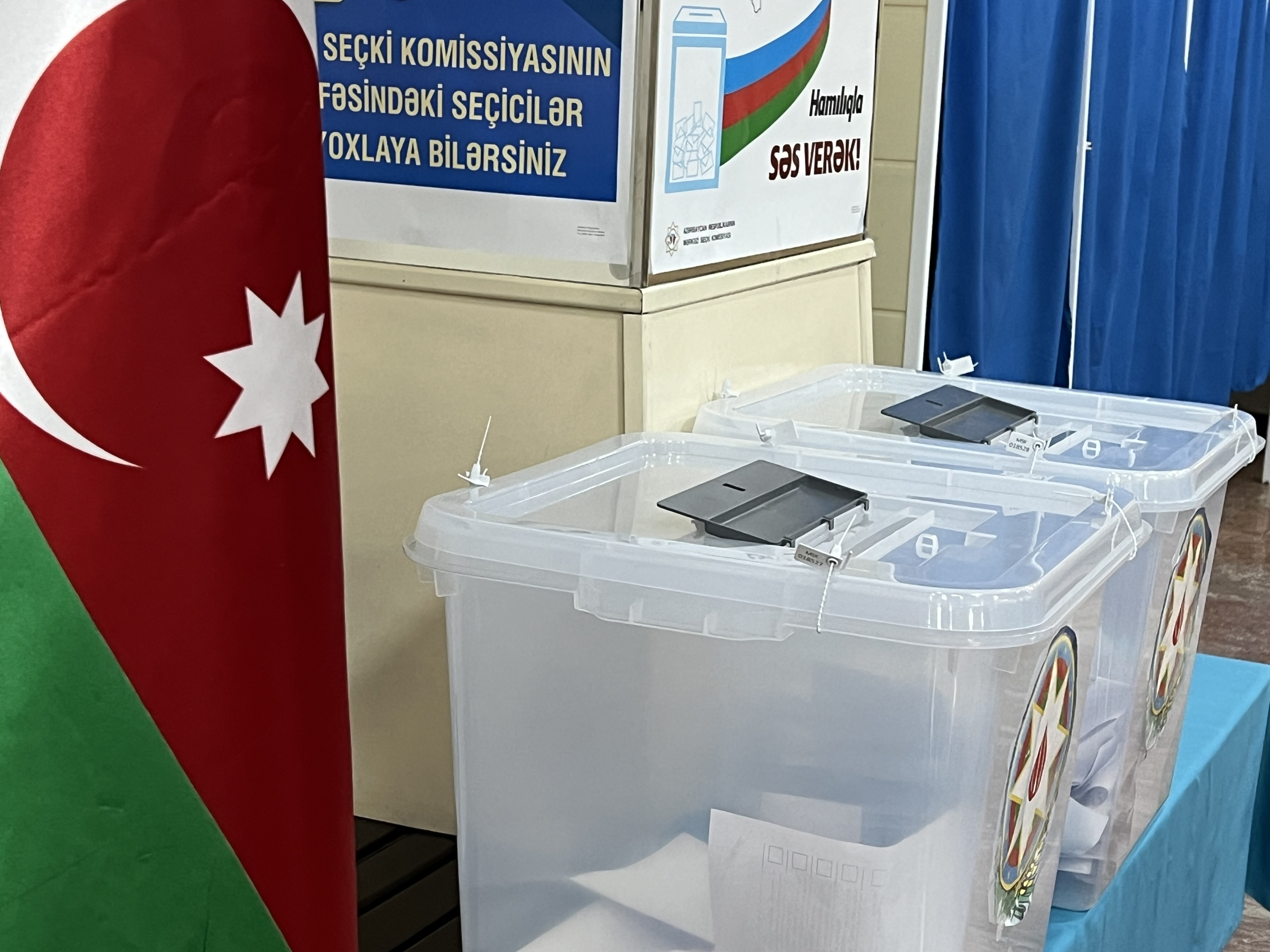
Ballot box for the presidential election

On 16 December 2023, CEC chairman Mazahir Panahov noted that a new electoral roll system was drawn up, that in case if a voter passed away on election day, then it would be reported in the voter listing, to which the project was prepared with the cooperation of the Ministry of Justice. In addition, he also announced any voter who turned out in the polls for the first time and media organizations reporting from here will be rewarded.

The CEC held a meeting on 20 December 2023, after which chairman Panahov made statements to the press revealing the number of registered voters for the 2024 presidential election numbering to approximately 6,254,556 people. The number of eligible voters in Azerbaijan has seen a significant increase, with a rise of 590,000 since the 2018 presidential election and an estimated 407,000 since the 2020 parliamentary election. Thus, a total of 6,524,203 paper ballots will be printed for the upcoming election, which will include the presidential candidates' last name, first name, and middle name arranged in alphabetical order.

The elections also coincided with the vacation break of the universities, and in this regard, Panahov requested the information list of university students from the Ministry of Science and Education in regard to their voter registration status and unveiled plan to create certain conditions for students to vote depending on their primary residence.

The CEC along with the Ministry of Foreign Affairs worked on assisting Azerbaijani citizens to vote overseas, with Panahov encouraging voters to register in the closest Azerbaijan's diplomatic missions. In 37 Azerbaijan's foreign diplomatic missions, a total of 49 polling stations have been established. Notably, the Azerbaijani embassy in Ankara, Turkey, has set up 55 polling stations, with additional stations located at the chief consulate in Istanbul and in Kars. Similarly, in the Russian Federation, polling stations are located at the Azerbaijani embassy headquarters in Moscow, as well as in Saint Petersburg and Yekaterinburg. Additionally, polling stations have been set up in various countries including Italy, South Korea, Kazakhstan (in cities such as Astana, Almaty, and Aktau), Qatar, Kyrgyzstan, Latvia, Lithuania, Belgium, the United Arab Emirates (including in Abu Dhabi and Dubai), the United Kingdom, China, the Czech Republic, Estonia, France, Georgia (in Tbilisi and Batumi), Jordan, Spain, Sweden, Switzerland (in Bern), the Netherlands, Uzbekistan, Pakistan, Poland, Germany, the United States (in Washington, D.C., and Los Angeles), Austria, Saudi Arabia, Turkmenistan, Ukraine, Greece, Iran (in Tehran and Tabriz), Belarus, Moldova, Hungary, and Romania.

=== Media coverage ===
According to the CEC, the persons whose candidacy is registered in the presidential elections will be allocated free airtime in the Azerbaijan Television and Radio Broadcasting for pre-election campaigning, as well as publication in Azerbaijan, Xalq Qəzeti, Respublika, and Bakinskiy Rabochiy newspapers.

44 media organizations applied to join the paid pre-election campaign in the election.

On 15 January 2024, a lot was cast for the campaign list of candidates in the Azerbaijan newspaper. The result was as follows: Elşad Musayev; Fuad Aliyev; Fazil Mustafa; Zahid Oruj; Ilham Aliyev; Qüdrat Hasanquliyev; Razi Nurullayev.

== Opinion polls ==
On 2 February 2024, the Oracle Advisory Group and the Civil Rights Defense League unveiled the results of a joint survey, indicating overwhelming support for Ilham Aliyev's candidacy for the presidency, which was criticized by presidential candidate Qüdrat Hasanquliyev for not being in line with reality despite acknowledging Aliyev's high popularity.

| Polling source | Date(s) conducted | Sample size | Ilham Aliyev | Zahid Oruj | Fazil Mustafa | Razi Nurullayev | Qüdrat Hasanquliyev | Fuad Aliyev | Elşad Musayev |
|---|---|---|---|---|---|---|---|---|---|
| ORACLE/VƏHML | 2 February 2024 | 3,000 | 97% | 1.2% | 0.7% | 0.5% | 0.3% | 0.2% | 0.1% |

=== Exit polls ===
| Polling source | Ilham Aliyev | Zahid Oruj | Fazil Mustafa | Razi Nurullayev | Qüdrat Hasanquliyev | Fuad Aliyev | Elşad Musayev |
|---|---|---|---|---|---|---|---|
| Oracle Advisory Group | 93.9% | 1.8% | 1.5% | 0.9% | 1.2% | 0.3% | 0.4% |
| Rəy | 92.6% | 0.4% | 0.6% | 1.2% | 0.5% | 0.8% | 0.1% |
| Social Research Center | 92.4% | 2.2% | 2% | 0.6% | 1.6% | 0.4% | 0.8 |

== Results ==
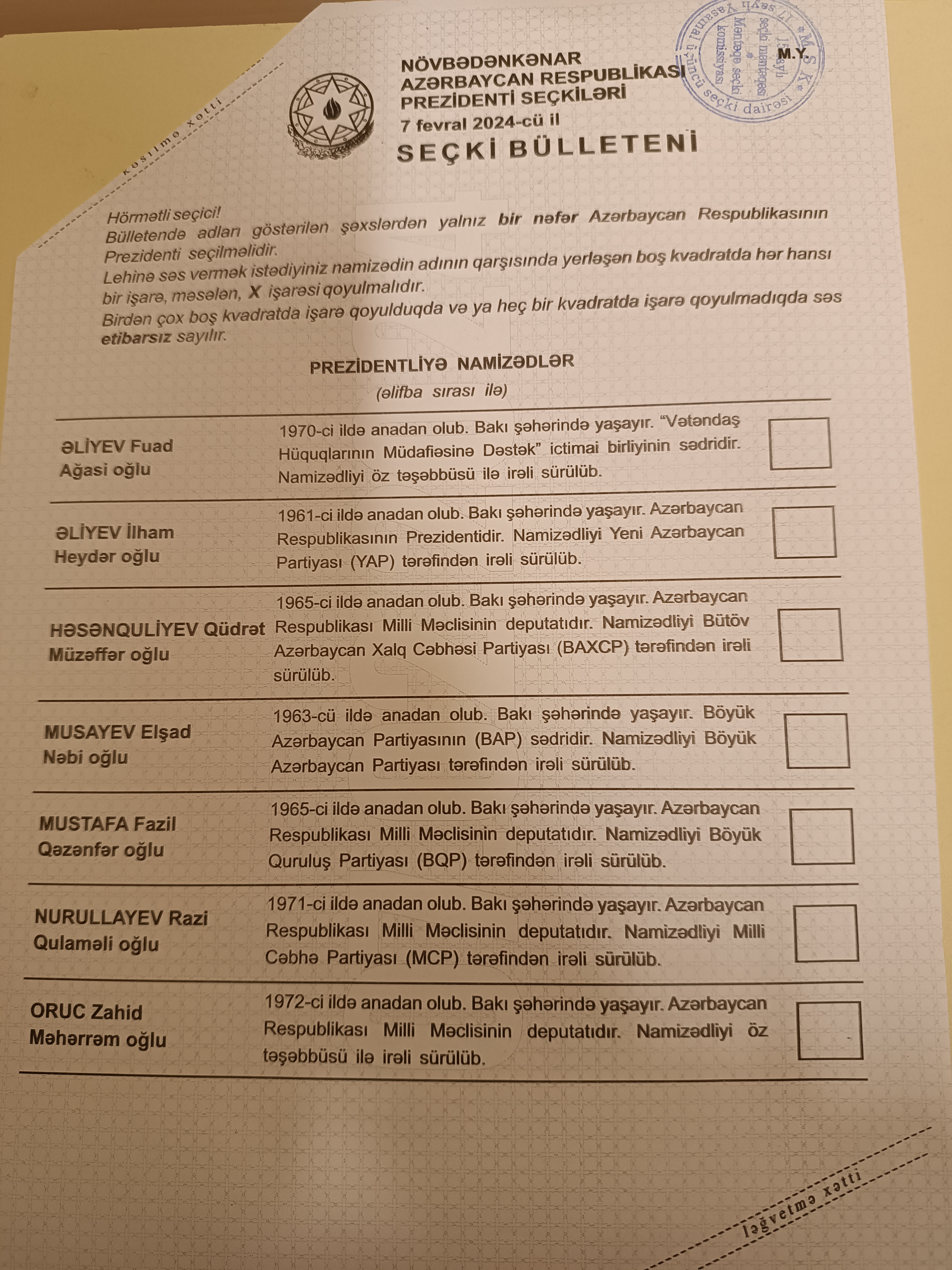
2024 Azerbaijani election ballot

At midnight on 7 February, preliminary election results were announced by the chairman of the Central Election Commission (CEC), Mazahir Panahov. With 54.5% of the votes reportedly counted, Ilham Aliyev was declared the winner of the election, securing over 92.1% of the vote.

| Candidate | Party | Votes | % |
|---|---|---|---|
| Ilham Aliyev | New Azerbaijan Party | 4,567,458 | 92.12 |
| Zahid Oruj | Independent | 107,632 | 2.17 |
| Fazil Mustafa | Great Order Party | 98,421 | 1.99 |
| Qüdrat Hasanquliyev | Whole Azerbaijan Popular Front Party | 85,411 | 1.72 |
| Razi Nurullayev | National Front Party | 39,643 | 0.80 |
| Elşad Musayev | Great Azerbaijan Party | 32,885 | 0.66 |
| Fuad Aliyev | Independent | 26,517 | 0.53 |
| Total | | 4,957,967 | 100.00 |
| Valid votes | | 4,957,967 | 99.80 |
| Invalid/blank votes | | 9,828 | 0.20 |
| Total votes | | 4,967,795 | 100.00 |
| Registered voters/turnout | | 6,514,222 | 76.26 |
Source: CEC

=== Voter turnout ===
Authorities said that at least 76% of the electorate had turned out to vote in the first nine hours of the election.

Time
| 10:00 | 12:00 | 15:00 | 17:00 | 19:00 |
|---|---|---|---|---|
| 19.44% | 38.57% | 60.54% | 70.85% | 76.73% |

== Reactions ==
In response to the announcement of Aliyev's victory, a support march was organized by supporters in the streets of Baku. Various celebrations over Aliyev's win took place in several cities including Ganja, Shusha, Biləsuvar, Cəlilabad, and Lachin. Victory parades were also held in Quba, Khachmaz, and Şabran.

The Musavat party issued a statement calling for the election results to be annulled, citing concerns about the undemocratic nature of the vote. The party proposed a re-run of presidential elections that genuinely reflect "the free will of the Azerbaijani people and adhere to international standards".

After the announcement of the exit polls, Aliyev received congratulatory messages from various leaders. He was congratulated by the presidents of Turkey, Uzbekistan, Kazakhstan, Kyrgyzstan, Turkmenistan and Hungarian Prime Minister Viktor Orbán, the member and observers of the Organization of Turkic States. Additionally, Ersin Tatar, the president of Northern Cyprus, also congratulated Aliyev on his victory. He was also congratulated by Albania, Algeria, Bangladesh, Belarus, Chinese President Xi Jinping, Egypt, both the Georgian president Salome Zourabichvili and prime minister Irakli Kobakhidze, Kuwait, Iran, Iraq, Morocco, Mozambique, Oman, Pakistan, Palestine, Qatar, Serbia, Tajikistan, Tunisia, Venezuela, Saudi king Salman, Russian president Vladimir Putin, and Ukrainian president Volodymyr Zelenskyy.

Aliyev also received congratulations from various Turkish politicians, including Foreign Minister Mevlüt Çavuşoğlu, Numan Kurtulmuş, speaker of the Grand National Assembly of Turkey, Vice President Fuat Oktay, Ömer Çelik, the spokesman for the Presidential Administration, and Sinan Oğan, a far-right candidate in the 2023 Turkish presidential election.
