= 2018 Azerbaijani presidential election =

- 11 April 2018
- Turnout: 74.24%
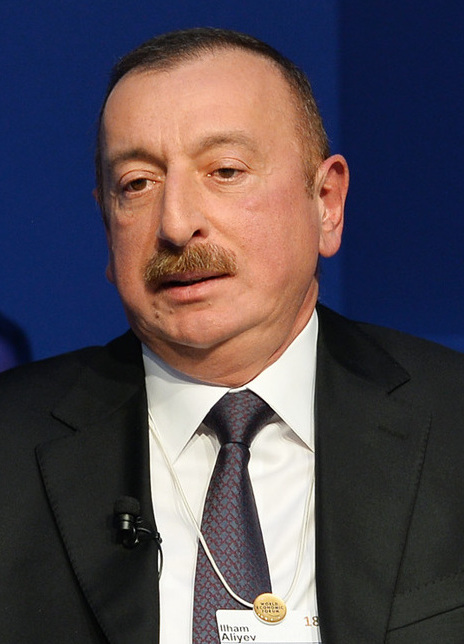

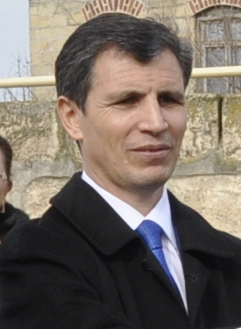
Nominee	Ilham Aliyev	Zahid Oruj
Party	New Azerbaijan	Independent
Running mate	Mehriban Aliyeva
Popular vote	3,394,898	122,956
Percentage	86.02%	3.12%
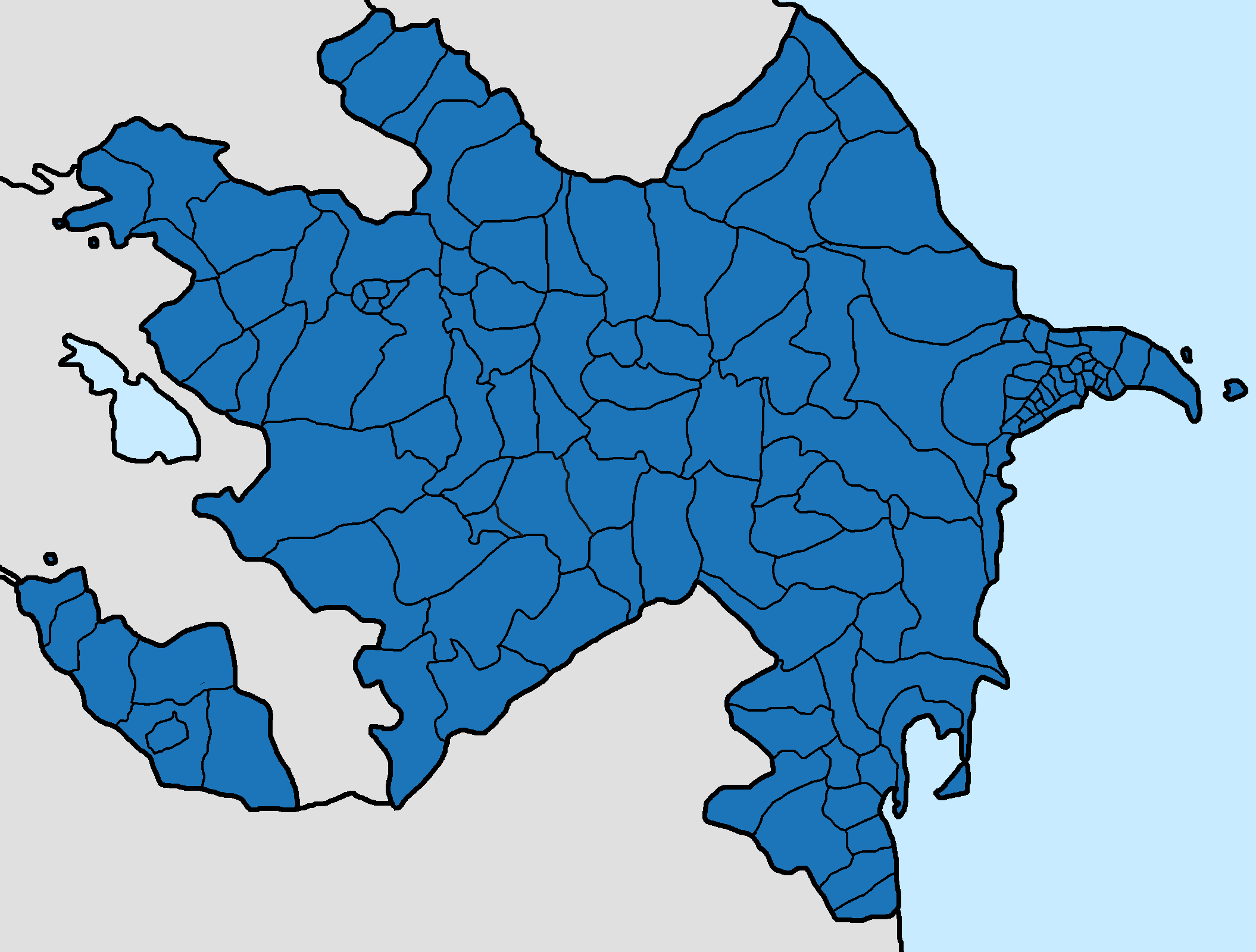
- Result by constituency Ilham Aliyev
President before election
Ilham Aliyev
New Azerbaijan
Elected President
Ilham Aliyev
New Azerbaijan

Presidential elections were held in Azerbaijan on 11 April 2018. The elections were the first since the 2016 constitutional referendum, which extended the presidential term from five to seven years. The incumbent, Ilham Aliyev, was re-elected president for a seven-year term.

The elections, which took place in an authoritarian context, were characterized as fraudulent. Major opposition parties were disqualified before the election and Aliyev's regime imprisoned major opposition figures. Eight candidates ran for the presidency, although there were doubts as to whether the opposition candidates were genuine candidates; Zahid Oruj, the runner-up in the election, asked his supporters to vote for Aliyev and praised his regime.

== Background ==
Article 178 §1 of the electoral law sets the third Wednesday of October as the date for presidential elections, which would have meant the elections were held on 17 October 2018. However, the vote was unexpectedly brought forward by a presidential decree on 5 February 2018. Azerbaijan's Central Election Commission (CEC) held a poll on 1 February 2018 on the preparation and delivery of double cabins for the voting room.

== Electoral system ==
The President of Azerbaijan is elected using a two-round system; if no candidate receives a majority of the vote in the first round, a run-off is held. Polls opened nationwide at 08:00 and closed at 19:00.

== Candidates ==
- Ilham Aliyev – incumbent President of Azerbaijan since 2003, chairman of the New Azerbaijan Party.
- Razi Nurullayev – political analyst, former deputy chairman of Azerbaijani Popular Front Party.
- Sardar Jalaloglu - politician, chairman of Azerbaijan Democratic Party. Previously ran for president in 2013.
- Zahid Oruj - member of the Parliament of Azerbaijan since 2001. Former deputy chairman of Motherland Party. Placed 5th in the presidential elections in 2013. During the campaign, he directly asked his voters to vote for Aliyev and praised his rule.
- Hafiz Hajiyev – chairman of the Modern Equality Party, previously participated in the 2003, 2008 and 2013 elections. During the campaign, he praised incumbent president Ilham Aliyev.
- Gudrat Hasanguliyev – member of the Parliament of Azerbaijan, chairman of the Whole Azerbaijan Popular Front Party. Previously participated in the 2003, 2008 and 2013 elections.
- Araz Alizadeh – member of the Parliament of Azerbaijan, chairman of the Social Democratic Party of Azerbaijan. Previously participated in the 2013 presidential elections and finished seventh. During the campaign, he criticized the political opposition in Azerbaijan.
- Faraj Guliyev – member of the Parliament of Azerbaijan, chairman of the National Revival Movement Party. Previously contested the 2013 presidential elections and finished eighth.

The National Council of Democratic Forces (NCDF) decided to boycott the elections and intends to launch protests against the elections. Another organisation, the Republican Alternative Movement (REAL), also announced that it would not recognize the results of the elections, calling them as a "hasty and unjustified step". On 10 February the Musavat Party announced that it would also boycott the elections and its leader Isa Gambar would not run for president. The same day, another opposition party, the Party of Hope, also announced that they would not participate in the elections.

== Opinion polls ==
A poll by ELS on 27 March found that 84.1% of respondents intended to vote for Aliyev. A poll by AJF & Associates on 28 March concluded that 82.9% or respondents intended to vote for Aliyev.

Date	Pollster	Aliyev	Hasanguliyev	Mammadov	Hajiyev	Guliyev	Oruj	Alizadeh	Nurullayev	Against all	Undecided	Abstention
2–3 April 2018	Omnibus	83.5%	2.0%	1.7%	1.6%	1.1%	0.9%	0.7%	0.5%	2.5%	2.3%	3.2%

=== Exit polls ===
Pollster	Date	Aliyev	Hasanguliyev	Mammadov	Hajiyev	Guliyev	Oruj	Alizadeh	Nurullayev
Els	11 April 2018	82.71%	4.23%	3.56%	2.10%	1.33%	3.37%	1.87%	0.92%
Opinion Way	11 April 2018	86.53%	3.10%	2.81%	1.73%	1.03%	2.92%	1.21%	0.67%
Arthur J. Finkelstein & Associates	11 April 2018	85.57%	2.96%	2.48%	1.76%	1.52%	2.92%	1.42%	1.37%

== Conduct ==
The Organization for Security and Co-operation in Europe (OSCE) announced that the election was not free and fair. In a press conference the day after the election, the OSCE found that there was "widespread disregard for mandatory procedures, a lack of transparency, and numerous serious irregularities, including ballot box stuffing." Aliyev's supporters took to disrupting the press conference and accused the international observation mission of bias.

== Results ==
Candidate	Party	Votes	%
Ilham Aliyev	New Azerbaijan Party	3,394,898	86.02
Zahid Oruj	Independent	122,956	3.12
Sardar Jalaloglu	Azerbaijan Democratic Party	119,621	3.03
Gudrat Hasanguliyev	Whole Azerbaijan Popular Front Party	119,311	3.02
Hafiz Hajiyev	Modern Equality Party	59,924	1.52
Araz Alizadeh	Azerbaijani Social Democratic Party	54,533	1.38
Faraj Guliyev	National Revival Movement Party	45,967	1.16
Razi Nurullayev	Independent	29,229	0.74
Total		3,946,439	100.00
Valid votes		3,946,439	99.69
Invalid/blank votes		12,413	0.31
Total votes		3,958,852	100.00
Registered voters/turnout		5,332,817	74.24
Source: CEC
