= Vasila Hajiyeva =

Azerbaijani political scientist and professor

- Vəsilə Hacıyeva Cümşüd qızı
- Born: April 12, 1969; Baku, Azerbaijan SSR
- Citizenship: Azerbaijan
- Education: Azerbaijan Technical University (Systems Engineering); The Academy of Public Administration (Aze) (Doctor of Philosophy on Politics, Doctor of Sciences on Politics)

Vasila Hajiyeva (Azerbaijani: Vəsilə Hacıyeva Cümşüd qızı born on April 12, 1969, in Baku, Azerbaijan), is an Azerbaijani political scientist, Professor of Political Science.

== Family ==
Her father — Jumshud Huseyn oglu Hajiyev (Turkel) was born in 1936 in the Sarvan region (Marneuli of the Republic of Georgia) of the Borchaly district, as the son of Huseyn Mahammad agha oglu Hajioglu and Mashadi Shahval Seyyid Askar agha gizi HajiSeyyidli (Shahval’s mother Mashadi Fakhransa was from the Topchiyevs lineage of Tiflis, and representatives of this lineage also carried the surname Topchubashov). During the 1950s, while studying at the Faculty of Philology of Baku State University, he became an active participant in the student dissident movement, and in the late 1980s and early 1990s, in the National Liberation Movement. First, he was the ideologist and founder of the Unity Party, and later the founder and leader of the Turkic World Unity Party. He died on November 11, 2004.

Her mother — Shovqiyya Mahyaddin gizi Hajiyeva was born in 1943 in the town of Aghdash, into a teacher’s family. She was born into the family of Mahyaddin Karimov, son of Zakir agha (whose family had fled from the Zardab district during the 1920s due to repression and persecution by the Bolshevik власти and had acquired the label “sesikesikler” (kulak). Zakir agha’s brother Haji Bakir Efendi had studied at Istanbul Darülfünun and became a renowned theologian scholar who opened the first madrasa in Aghdash; Haji Aziz Efendi, son of Zakir's another brother Ibrahimkhalil agha, was a well-known educator and philanthropist who died in exile in 1927; Bakir Efendi’s grandson Vahid Karimov is a doctor of philosophy and professor) and Yakhshikhanim Ali gizi Ismayilova. She was a mathematics teacher. She died on September 3, 2024.

She is the cousin of Pərvanə Hacıyeva.

== Education and degrees ==
- Doctor of Sciences on Politics (D.Sc. - equivalent to a Habilitation). (defense-2011, diploma-2012). The Academy of Public Administration at the President of the Republic of Azerbaijan, Baku. Thesis titled “Complex Systems Research of Politics”.,
- Post-doctoral researcher. (2007-2009). Department of Political Science and Political Sociology. Institute of Philosophy and Law. Azerbaijan National Academy of Sciences.
- Candidate of Sciences on Politics (PhD) (defense-2004, diploma-2005). The Academy of Public Administration at the President of the Republic of Azerbaijan, Baku, Azerbaijan. Thesis titled “Information Support of Politics”.,
- Post-graduate student. (1997-2001). The Academy of Public Administration at the President of the Republic of Azerbaijan, Baku, Azerbaijan.
- Systems Engineer. (1986-1991—higher education). Computer Science. Azerbaijan Technical University, Baku, Azerbaijan.

== Academic titles ==
- Professor at the Department of Political Science and International Relations. By the decision of the Supreme Attestation Commission attached to the President of the Republic of Azerbaijan dated March 14, 2017 (Minutes 05-k).
- Associate Professor at the Department of Political Science and International Relations. By the decision of the Supreme Attestation Commission attached to the President of the Republic of Azerbaijan dated January 27, 2015 (Minutes 04-k).

== Research experience ==
- 2016–2017 (Spring Semester). Visiting Scholar. Davis Center for Russian and Eurasian Studies. Harvard University, United States.,
- 2014–2015. Visiting Scholar. REEES - Russian, East European, and Eurasian Studies Centre.
- Unused invitations from Columbia University, Warwick University, and Salerno University

== Selected publications ==
- The Dilemma of Monopoly and Democracy in Azerbaijani Party Politics. Summer 2024. Demokratizatsiya: The Journal of Post-Soviet Democratization. Volume 32, Number 3, pp. 217–249. Institute for European, Russian, and Eurasian Studies, The George Washington University.
- To a Perfect Society through Intellectual Liberalism / İntellektual liberalism ilə kamil cəmiyyətə. 2023. In Azerbaijani & English. Bakı: “Qanun nəşriyyatı”. 224 p.
- Political Organism: Elements, Relations, Processes. 2008. In Azerbaijani. Bakı: “Elm”. 336 s.,
- Complex view to politics. 2003. In Azerbaijani. Bakı: “Azərbaycan Universiteti”. 186 s.
- Intellectual liberalism: a theoretical way based on the legacy of Turkic thought. 2022. ISJ Theoretical & Applied Science, 05 (109), 38–49. Philadelphia, USA ,
- Political scene and political culture in the clash of generations: analysis of early parliamentary elections on February 9, 2020, in Azerbaijan. 2020. ISJ Theoretical & Applied Science, 11 (91), 227–239. Philadelphia, USA ,
- To Oligarchy through Democracy or to Disorder through Order. 2018. ISJ Theoretical & Applied Science, 10(66): 235–247. Philadelphia, USA ,
- EU's Policy for Azerbaijan: Challenges, Errors and Opportunities. 2015. Akademik Bakış Dergisi. SayıI 52. Kasım - Aralık. Uluslararası Hakemli Sosyal Bilimler E-Dergisi. İktisat ve Girişimçilik Üniversitesi, Türk Dünyası.
- Problem of Globalizing of Democracy in the Context of Correlation of Local, Regional and Global Conditions. In Proceedings of the 23rd World Congress of Political Science, organized by the International Political Science Association (IPSA), Montreal, Canada, July 19-24, 2014. DASH at Harvard,
- Correlation between Philosophy and Politics: Complex Systems Approach to the Question. In Proceedings of the 23rd World Congress of Philosophy (WCP 2013), Athens, Greece, August 4 – 10, 2013. DASH at Harvard,
- On Correlation between Politics and Law. DASH at Harvard,
- On Stability and Sustainability of Political System. DASH at Harvard,
- Turkey and New World System. 2013. Geostrategy. N 02 (14). Baku.
- Global Crisis: Reasons, Directions, Solution Ways. 2010. In Russian. Век глобализации. V.1. Москва. Россия.;
- Two Basic Sides of the Global Order and Disorder in the Modern Period – Democratization and Conflicts. 2010. In Azerbaijani. “Fəlsəfə və sosial-siyasi elmlər” jurnalı, V. 4(28). Bakı.
- Systematic Approach to the Local, Regional and Global Security. 2009. In Turkish. (Yerel, bölgesel ve küresel güvenliye doğru yaklaşım). “2023” Dergisi, sayı 94, Ankara, Türkiye.
- On Correlation between Politics and Law. 2009. In Russian. (К вопросу о соотношении политики и права). Мир человека. Философский и общественно-гуманитарный журнал. No.2 (40). Алма-Ата, Казахыстан.
- Azerbaijanizm and Turkizm in the National Ideological System. The Philosopher's Index. An International Index to Philosophical Periodicals and Books. V.44, N 4, 4-th quarter, P.383, 2010. “Philosopher’s Information Center”, USA; 2009.
- Conditions of the Optimum Geopolitical Activities. 2009. In Azerbaijani. BDU-nun xəbərləri. Humanitar elmlər seriyası, No.1. Bakı.
- Coordination Between Politics and Economy. 2008. In Azerbaijani. AMEA-nın xəbərləri. İqtisadiyyat elmləri seriyası. N 2. Bakı.
- The Network of Internal and External Relations of Political System. 2008. In Azerbaijani. “Fəlsəfə və sosial-siyasi elmlər” jurnalı, N 4. Bakı.
- Relations between Politics and Philosophy in Terms of Ideology. 2008. In Azerbaijani. “Fəlsəfə və sosial-siyasi elmlər” jurnalı, N 4(22). Bakı.
- Moral Criteria of Politics. 2007. In Azerbaijani. Pedaqoji Universitetin xəbərləri. N 3. Bakı.

== Fields of interest ==
Political theory, complexity theory, democracy, international relations, world politics and comparative politics

== International relations ==
=== Editorial membership ===
- Editorial Advisory Board member. New Horizons. Research Journal. Faculty of Social Sciences. Greenwich University. Karachi-Pakistan.
- Editorial Board member. "Metafizika" International Journal of Philosophy and Interdisciplinary Research. ISSN 2616-6879. Baku. Azerbaijan.

=== Projects ===
Institutional Coordinator. Erasmus Mundus 2013 ‒ 2017. Partnership title: “Education Force: Driving Mobility for EU - East Europe cooperation”

== Political activity ==
Central Election Commission of the Republic of Azerbaijan (CEC) approved the candidacy of Vasila Hajiyeva to deputy on Khatai second Con.EC #34 in the Elections to the Milli Majlis (parliament) of the Republic of Azerbaijan, dated February 9, 2020.

From this circle, the ruling party nominated Mikhail Zabelin. Vasila Hajiyeva was considered by the public as the main opponent for Mikhail Zabelin. , , 

The election campaign was conducted under unequal conditions. Thus, while all the executive structures of Khatai district were mobilized for Zabelin, the executive power prevented posters of Vasila Hajiyeva from being outside the polling boards. Moreover, posters of Vasila Hajiyeva were regularly removed from election boards till election day. In addition, three other persons with surname of Hajiyeva and Hajiyev were nominated as candidates for the presence in the ballot papers on Hajiyev's name (these people did not campaign in the area). On February 10, 2020, Vasila Hajiyeva addressed the public about the fraudulent victory of Mikhail Zabelin on election day (February 9, 2020) with reliable facts about the violation of the electoral rights of voters and total fraud. , On February 12, 2020, Vasila Hajiyeva filed a complaint against the actions (inactions) and decisions violating citizens’ election rights in the Election to the Milli Majlis, appointed to February 9, 2020. On February 17, 2020, during a session of the Central Election Commission (CEC) made a decision related to the Khatai second Con.EC # 34. The voting results on the PECs # 1, 2, 3, 4, 18, 30 and 35 of Khatai second Con.EC # 34 due to the impossibility of determining voters’ will in the final voting results protocols of those PECs. ; , On February 20, 2020, Vasila Hajiyeva filed a complaint against the decision of the CEC to the Baku Court of Appeal. The Baku Court of Appeal found the dispute in favor of the CEC by a decision of February 22, 2020, not satisfying the lawsuit.
