= Emin Ibrahimov =

Azerbaijani diplomat (born 1981)

- Emin Şaiq oğlu İbrahimov
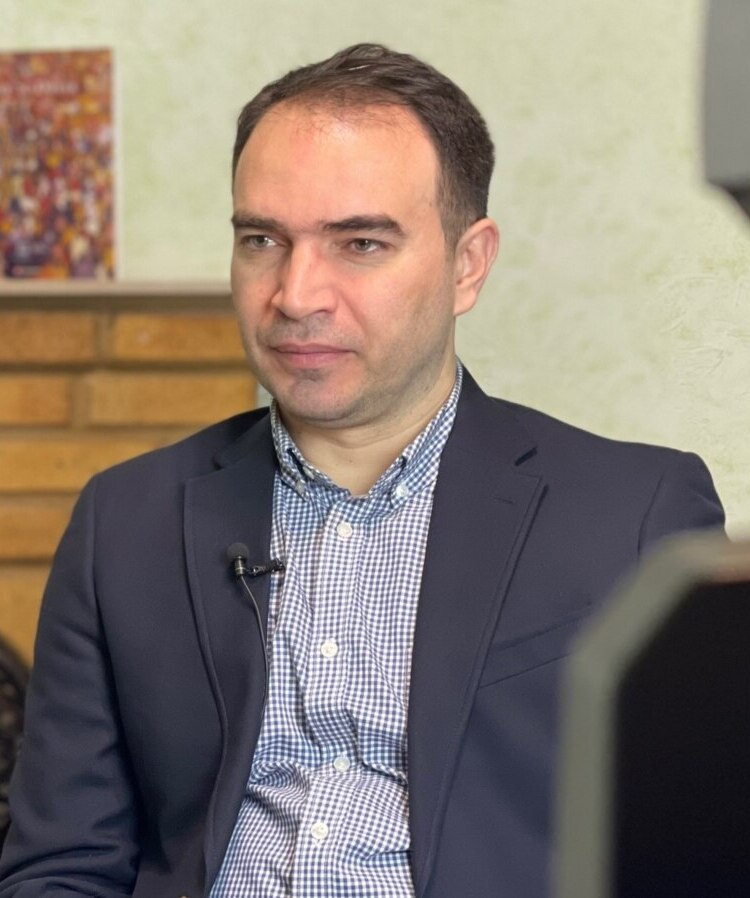
- Emin Ibrahimov in 2024
- Born: Emin Shaig oglu Ibrahimov; 13 June 1981 (age 45); Sumgait, Azerbaijan
- Education: Baku State University (B); Ankara University (M)
- Occupation: diplomat
- Years active: 2007–2020

Emin Shaig oglu Ibrahimov — former Azerbaijani diplomat; currently a political prisoner; In 2007–2020, he worked in various positions in the Ministry of Foreign Affairs of Azerbaijan. In March 2020, he resigned in protest against human rights violations in Azerbaijan and became a critic of the Azerbaijani government. He was administratively arrested in September 2023. In July 2024, this trip was brought to criminal responsibility on the charge of "hooliganism". A number of local and international human rights institutions considered his arrest to be politically motivated.

== Early life ==
Emin Shaig oglu Ibrahimov was born on June 13, 1981, in the city of Sumgait. In 2002, he graduated from the Faculty of International Relations of Baku State University. In 2005, he received a master's degree in political science from Ankara University, Turkey. In 2009, he graduated from the Advanced Course of the NATO Defense College.

== Activity ==
In 2007, he passed the civil service exam and started working as an attache at the Ministry of Foreign Affairs of Azerbaijan.

In 2012–2016, he worked as a secretary in the Embassy of Azerbaijan in the United States, and in 2016–2019, he worked as a chargé d'affaires in the Diplomatic Mission of Azerbaijan in Uruguay.

On March 3, 2020, Emin Ibrahimov resigned in protest against the violation of human rights in Azerbaijan and the fraud that took place in the February 9, 2020 parliamentary elections. In his resignation letter, he explained the reasons for his decision: "Working as a diplomat in the context of the collapse of the electoral system in Azerbaijan, the erosion of the foundations of political legitimacy, and the systematic stifling of freedoms creates more and more serious moral dilemmas. The recent parliamentary "elections" were the last straw for me. Taking these into account, I ask you to order my expulsion from the diplomatic service." Some time after his resignation, pro-government websites published articles targeting Emin Ibrahimov.

After his resignation, Emin Ibrahimov engaged in social activities, using his social media accounts to criticize the pro-Russian policy of the Azerbaijani government and expressed his opposition to the violation of human rights in the country. He was a trainer in diplomatic and organizational management at the Institute of Political Management.

Emin Ibrahimov was detained on September 20, a day after the criticisms he wrote on his social media accounts during the Azerbaijani offensive in Nagorno-Karabakh and calling the war "politics playing into the hands of Russia". The Department of Non-Criminal Prosecution of the General Prosecutor's Office of Azerbaijan prepared materials about him and sent them to the court for consideration. It was claimed that Ibrahimov shared his views supporting terrorism. Emin Ibrahimov said that the accusations were fabricated and that he was punished for criticizing the war. According to the decision of the Yasamal District Court, Emin Ibrahimov was sentenced to administrative detention for 30 days under Article 388–1.1.1 of the Code of Administrative Offenses (posting prohibited information on the Internet).

== Arrested ==
Emin Ibrahimov was detained again on July 22, 2024, and this time a criminal case was initiated against him. He was charged with articles 126.2.4 (deliberate oral harm to health with hooliganism) and 221.1 (hooliganism) of the Criminal Code. According to the allegation, Emin Ibrahimov injured someone named Kamal with a knife near the metro station "Friendship of Peoples". Ibrahimov pleaded not guilty, saying that this accusation was false, and the incident was fictitious. "I am a victim of the authoritarian regime," he said at the court where the arrest warrant was issued. According to Emin Ibrahimov, on July 22, while he was going to the apartment near the metro station to repair his apartment, an unknown person suddenly attacked him and tried to tear his clothes. Soon after, plainclothes police officers came to that area and arrested Ibrahimov. After being detained, Emin Ibrahimov was taken to the 24th Police Department of the Nizami District Police Department. The demand was to give the password of his phone. When Zahid Oruj, chairman of the Human Rights Committee of the Milli Majlis, commented on the issue of torture, he stated that it was a lie and that there was no pressure against him.

By the decision of the Nizami District Court, Emin Ibrahimov was sentenced to 4 months of detention. Ibrahimov started a hunger strike after his arrest. On August 12, Emin Ibrahimov decided to stop his hunger strike for 20 days after the requests of his parents, relatives and friends.

Currently, he is being held in the Investigation Detention Center No. 3 of the Penitentiary Service of the Ministry of Justice.

On October 24, 2024, the European Parliament adopted a resolution on human rights violations in Azerbaijan. In the resolution of the Parliament, on the eve of COP29, the repressions against activists, journalists, and opposition leaders in Azerbaijan were significantly intensified. Emin Ibrahimov was also mentioned in the resolution.
