= MDHP =

MDHP may refer to:

- National Revival Movement Party, a political party in Azerbaijan
- The Million Dollar Homepage
