= Razi Nurullayev =

Azerbaijani politician (born 1971)

Razi Qulaməli oğlu Nurullayev
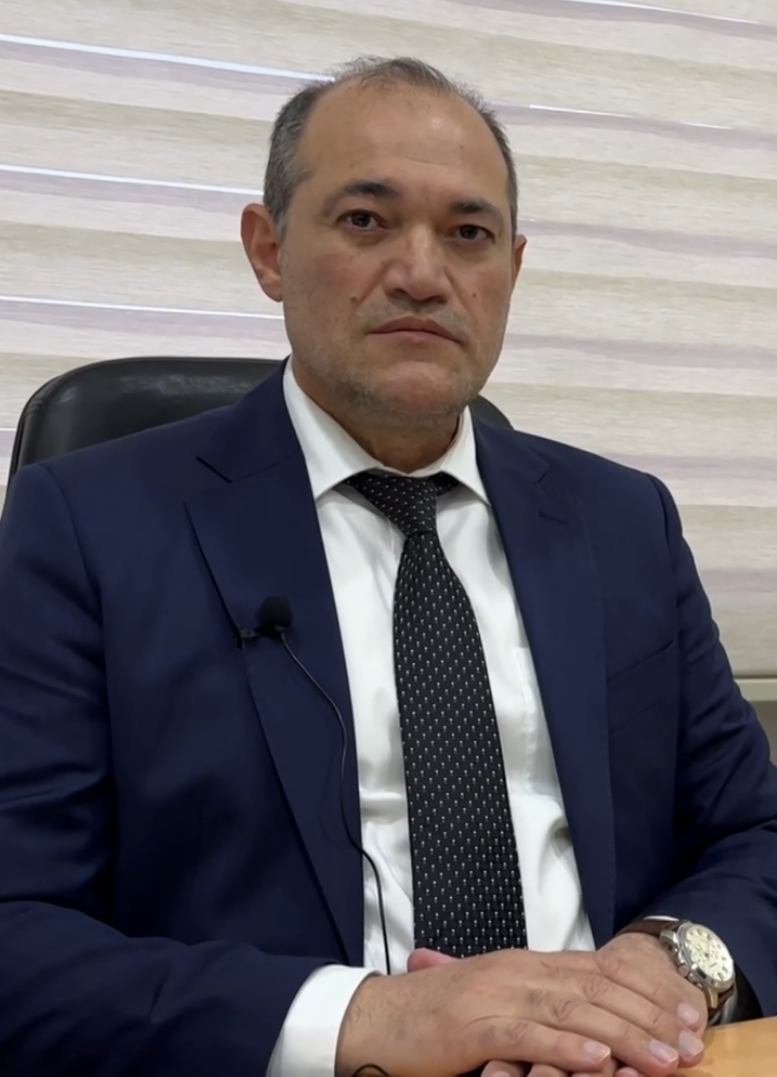
- Nurullayev in 2024

Chairman of the National Front Party
- Incumbent
- Assumed office 29 July 2020
- Preceded by: Position established

Member of the National Assembly for Imishli
- Incumbent
- Assumed office 9 February 2020
- Preceded by: Basil Qasimov

Deputy-chairperson for Foreign Affairs of the APFP
- In office September 2009 – February 2015

Personal details
- Born: 1 April 1971 (age 55) Imishli, Azerbaijan SSR, Soviet Union
- Party: National Front Party
- Other political affiliations: Azerbaijan Popular Front Party (until 2015)
- Education: Azerbaijan University of Languages; Southern Russian Humanitarian Institute
- Website: Official blog

Razi Qulaməli oğlu Nurullayev (born 1 April 1971) is an Azerbaijani politician who is a Member of the National Assembly of Azerbaijan. One of the biggest oppositionists in Azerbaijan 2018, 2024 Presidential elections candidate.

He is founder and chair of the National Front Party.

== Early life and education ==
Nurullayev was born on 1 April 1971 in Khalfali village of Imishli District in Azerbaijan SSR.

In 1978-1988 he received primary and secondary education at the school of Khalfali village of Imishli District.

In 1997 Nurullayev received a master's degree from Azerbaijan University of Languages, and in 2005 he graduated from Southern Russian Humanitarian Institute’s Law Faculty.

== Political career ==
In February 2005 Razi Nurullayev formed Yox! Movement – Azerbaijan. The stated aim of the movement was to say "YOX" (NO) to anti-democratic thinking.

Since 2009 he has been a deputy-chairperson for Foreign Affairs of Azerbaijan Popular Front Party (APFP).

Nurullayev ran in the 2009 Municipal elections and 2010 parliamentary elections.

In 2023, Nurullayev supported legislation that restricted the ability of political parties to register and compete in Azerbaijani politics. The bill, which was passed into law by the parliament dominated by Ilham Aliyev's New Azerbaijan Party, further restricted the already limited ability of opposition to contest elections in Azerbaijan.
