= Azerbaijan Democrat Party =

Azerbaijan Democrat Party Azərbaycan Demokrat Partiyası
- Chairman: Sardar Jalaloglu
- Founder: Sardar Jalaloglu
- Founded: January 26, 1991
- Ideology: Conservatism

Website
- Adp-müxalifət

The Azerbaijan Democrat Party (Azerbaijani: Azərbaycan Demokrat Partiyası), also known as ADP, is a conservative political party in Azerbaijan.

== History ==
The Azerbaijan Democrat Party was established on January 26, 1991, by the participants of 27 persons. On October 17, it was registered by the Cabinet of Ministers of the Nakhchivan Autonomous Republic. It was registered by the Ministry of Justice of Azerbaijan Republic on March 14, 1993, after the adoption a new law about political parties. Later in the same year, the headquarters of the party was moved into the city of Baku. Sardar Jalaloglu was elected as a party leader at the first Congress of ADP and remained a sole leader of the ADP between 1994 and 1996. In order to prevent the participation of ADP in the parliament election, the Ministry of Justice, by political request, cancelled the registration of the party illegally on September 1, 1995. As a result of five years intensive and continues struggle, and by the pressure of international organizations and diplomatic corpus to the government, the Justice Ministry had to reregister ADP again.

== Integration ==
ADP is a leader and pioneer of integration in the history of Azerbaijan’s political life. On March 30, 1996, under the leadership of Ilyas Ismayilov - the former General Prosecutor and Chairman of “Adalat” (Justice) Party in 1998, under the leadership of ex-speaker of Azerbaijani parliament Rasul Guliyev’s “International Fond of Democracy and Ecology”, Democratic Azerbaijan Party; in 2000 the Democratic Path Party joined to ADP. The first time in the history of Azerbaijan’s political life, five members of the dominant governing party YAP (NAP) in Milli Majlis (Parliament) and one neutral member joined to ADP between 1998 and 1999.

== Conference ==
First Conference – 25.04.1992, Nakhchivan
Second Conference - 28.07.1993, Baku
Third Conference - 23.01.1994, Baku
Sixth (Unification) Conference - 29.11.1998, Baku
Seventh Emergency Conference - 22.06.2003, Baku

== Congress ==
1- First Congress – 07.08.1994, Baku
2- Second (emergency) Congress - 10.09.1995, Baku
3- Third extraordinary (unification) and
4- Four (unification) Congress - 30.03.1996, Baku
5- Third (extraordinary) Congress - 25.04.1998, Baku
8- Eighth Congress – 23.04.2005, Baku
9- Ninth Congress – 27.05.2005, Baku

== Political Council ==
Those represented in the leadership of the ADP
Chairman – Sardar Jalaloglu
Deputy Chairman – Hasret Rustemov
Deputy Election and Legistilation – Taliyet Aliyev
Deputy Section of Analysis and Information – Nureddin İsmayılov
Deputy Organizational Department – Reshid Mensurov
Deputy Finance and Agriculture – Zakir Huseynov
Deputy of Section of Works with Women – Nazila Soltan
Secretary of High Majlis – Vaqif Shirinov
The Chairman of the Central Control-Inspection Commission - Bahruz Mammedov
Deputy Chairman on Youth Affairs -

The deputies of the party's youth organization working with young people
Deputy Director of Public Relations – Azer Sadikhov
Deputy Organizational Department – Osman Ahmadov
Deputy of Press and Information – İlham Haziyev
Deputy chairman of the electoral and legal issues - Elshan Shakhbazov

== Election results ==
=== Presidential elections ===
Election	Party candidate	Votes	%	Result
2013	Sardar Jalaloglu	22,773	0.62%	Lost ✗
2018	Sardar Jalaloglu	119,621	3.03%	Lost ✗

=== National Assembly elections ===
Election	Leader	Votes	%	Seats	+/–	Position	Government
2000–2001	Sardar Jalaloglu		1.1	0 / 125	New	▲8th	Extra-parliamentary
2005	Sardar Jalaloglu			0 / 125	0	▼13th	Extra-parliamentary
2010	Sardar Jalaloglu	7,662	0.32	0 / 125	0	▼16th	Extra-parliamentary
2015	Sardar Jalaloglu	2,746	0.10	0 / 125	0	▼23rd	Extra-parliamentary
2020	Sardar Jalaloglu	6,110	0.26	0 / 125	0	▲14th	Extra-parliamentary
2024	Sardar Jalaloglu	2,013	0.08	0 / 125	0	▼23rd	Extra-parliamentary
