= Zardusht Alizadeh =

Azerbaijani political analyst and former politician

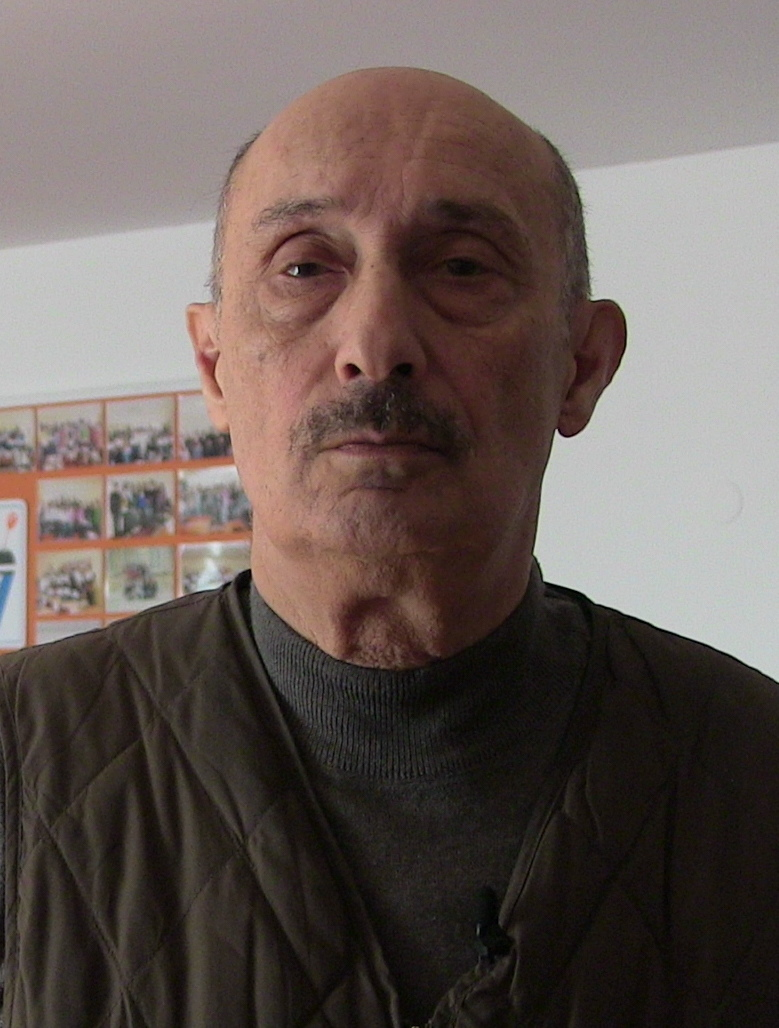
Zardusht Alizadeh

Zardusht Mammad Mubariz oglu Alizadeh (Azerbaijani: Zərdüşt Əlizadə; born 2 February 1946) is an independent Azerbaijani political analyst and former politician. He is known for his interviews, political comments and articles criticizing the heavy-handed rule of the ruling New Azerbaijan Party.

== Early life ==
Zardusht Alizadeh was born in Baku in 1946, one of the three children of Mammad Mubariz Alizadeh, a professor of philology of the Baku State University, and his wife Zinat. In a 2017 interview, Alizadeh identified himself as Azerbaijani and, when specifically asked about his ethnic identity, as a Turk. In another statement in March 2017, he said that his parents and all his ancestors had considered themselves Turks, while he considered himself Azerbaijani and was proud of his nation. He attended Public School #132 and, in 1969, graduated from the Baku State University with a degree in Arab Studies. For the next seven years, he worked as a Russian to Arabic translator with various Soviet missions in Egypt and South Yemen. From 1971 to 1990, he worked for the Institute of Oriental Studies of the Azerbaijan National Academy of Sciences, where he later earned a master's degree in philology.

== In the Popular Front ==
In 1988, Zardusht Alizadeh became one of the founders of the Popular Front of Azerbaijan, the first opposition party in then Soviet Azerbaijan. In his memoirs, Alizadeh described his initial vision of the party as one led by "patriotic intellectuals able to [...] make adequate decisions guaranteeing [...] democratization, transferring of the state's property under the people's control, freedom of speech, a multi-party system and fair elections". Alizadeh says he was against electing Abulfaz Elchibey as the leader of the new party, as that would mean changing its orientation from being democratic to nationalist. Later he also questioned Isa Gambar's dedication to democratic change, accusing him of "pandering to the demands of the angry mob" to gain its support.

In 1989, he was one of the party delegates sent to Georgia to meet with members of the Georgian opposition, including Zviad Gamsakhurdia and Merab Kostava, to prevent potential ethnic clashes involving Georgia's Azerbaijani minority.

Alizadeh belonged to the centrist wing of the Popular Front, which is why, as the party's radicalised membership grew, he and fellow centrists came under the attack of Elchibey's supporters, mainly Azernaijani natives of Nakhchivan and Armenia. Alizadeh described the state of the Popular Front at the time as a "gathering of KGB agents and regional mafia clans". On 7 January 1990, Zardusht Alizadeh announced his resignation from the Popular Front due to the fact that the capture of the party by extremists, according to him, was leading to violence and chaos.

== In opposition ==
Almost immediately after leaving the Popular Front, together with his brother Araz Alizadeh and fellow ex-Popular Front members Leyla Yunus, Fakhraddin Aghayev, Abdulvahab Manafov and Arzu Abdullayeva, Alizadeh founded the Azerbaijan Social Democratic Party, which aimed at a Western European style of social democracy and more harmony in relations with other former Soviet republics. He unsuccessfully ran for a seat in the Supreme Council of Azerbaijan on 30 September 1990 and claimed the election was rigged.

Elchibey was elected as Azerbaijan's new president in the 1992 election. In his interviews and publications, Alizadeh described Elchibey's presidency as thoughtless, destructive and paving way to the dictatorial rule of Heydar Aliyev. He openly called Popular Front activists "Aliyev's agents". In 2000, he left the party then led by his brother Araz Alizadeh, unimpressed by the latter's policies, and the relationship between the two brothers remains strained.

== Current activity ==
After retiring from politics, Alizadeh has continued to be a critic of the current Azerbaijani government. He describes the political state of Azerbaijan as an increasingly absolute rule, when the ruling elite is only interested in multiplying its own wealth. He remains skeptical about the country's democratic progress for as long as the West "turns a blind eye" on it due to being depended on Azerbaijan's oil and gas.

In 2006, in the aftermath of the arrest of the opposition journalist Mirza Sakit on the allegedly fabricated charges of drug possession, Zardusht Alizadeh published an article in the newspaper Azadlig accusing the key figures of the Ministry of Foreign Affairs Drug Enforcement Administration of running drug-related business themselves. The Ministry filed a lawsuit against Alizadeh for libel, and the court ordered him to pay the Ministry restitution.

Alizadeh views Russia as a power that orchestrated the Nagorno-Karabakh conflict between Armenia and Azerbaijan and continues to be the sole power that exercises control over the negotiations. This, however, does not stop other great powers, including the United States, from trying to benefit from the conflict situation, according to Alizadeh. He is pessimistic about the efforts of the Minsk Group, the official mediator, and believes that any developments, positive or negative, in the negotiation process are either a reflection of the geopolitical interests of the great powers or pre-election bravado of the parties at conflict.

In 2012, Alizadeh condemned the pardoning of Ramil Safarov, a convicted murderer of an Armenian officer, extradited to Azerbaijan from Hungary after serving eight years of his lifelong sentence. According to Alizadeh, the act was not based on any political will, respect of law or interest in conflict resolution, but instead had only "cheap fame" to it, and could only disrupt the peaceful solution of the Nagorno-Karabakh conflict.

Alizadeh has been critical of the non-governmental organisations and opposition parties calling on the international military operation against Iran from Azerbaijan's territory. He described such an attack against a sovereign state both as a violation of international law and a major destabilising factor in the region, which may lead Iranian troops to incur in Azerbaijan and reach Baku in a matter of 12 hours. At the same time, Alizadeh believes Iran is very likely to be targeted by an American military operation in the near future.

From 2005 to 2011, Zardusht Alizadeh was the head of the executive board of the Azerbaijani branch of the Soros Foundation. He is currently the director of a private establishment known as the Baku School of Journalism.

== Personal life ==
Zardusht Alizadeh married Niyal Barkhalova in 1970. They have two sons, Khazar and Salur. Salur Alizadeh was detained on 21 January 2009 for alleged possession of one gram of heroin and sentenced to five months. Zardusht Alizadeh, who described this as a trap and the government's retaliation for his own political activity, said his son was as much guilty of possession as the opposition journalists who were arrested on the same charges at various times in the past. Alizadeh believed by arresting his son, the government sent him a warning for describing the Azerbaijani ruling elite as an "organised criminal ruling class [that] uses oil money to assert its authority over the population" during his speech in the European Parliament two months before Salur Alizadeh's arrest.
