= National Front Party (Azerbaijan) =

National Front Party Milli Cəbhə Partiyası
- Abbreviation: MCP
- Leader: Razi Nurullayev
- Founder: Razi Nurullayev
- Founded: 19 August 2015 (AXCP EQTK); 29 July 2020 (MCP)
- Registered: 31 August 2020
- Split from: Azerbaijani Popular Front Party
- Membership (2021): 2,000
- Ideology: Azerbaijani nationalism Social democracy (self-described)
- Colours: Azure and red
- National Assembly: 1 / 125

Website
- millicebhe.com

The National Front Party (Azerbaijani: Milli Cəbhə Partiyası; MCP) is a registered political party in Azerbaijan established by Razi Nurullayev and on August 31, 2020.

== History ==
On August 19, 2015, forces dissatisfied with Ali Karimli announced the formation of the AXCP Confidence Congress Organizing Committee (AXCP EQTK), a former deputy chairman of the APFP, Razi Nurullayev. After being elected chairman, the APFP ECRC did not recognize this congress and elections, held a congress on October 17, 2015 and elected Razi Nurullayev chairman of the APFP.

Razi Nurullayev resigned on behalf of the Popular Front Party at the party's congress on July 29, 2020 and founded a new National Front Party.

The party was registered on September 1, 2020.

== Symbols ==
The elements used in the logo are the moon, the star and the exinasea flower. The crescent reflected in the logo is a symbol of the Turkic peoples.

As for the meaning of the octagonal star, it shows the spelling of the word "Azerbaijan" in the old alphabet and the commitment of all peoples living in Azerbaijan to the ideology of equality and Azerbaijanism.

The blue color used in the logo is associated with the idea of Pan-Turkism. Red represents the building of a modern society and democratic development.

== Election results ==
=== Presidential elections ===
Election	Party candidate	Votes	%	Result
2024	Razi Nurullayev	39,643	0.80%	Lost ✗

=== National Assembly elections ===
Election	Leader	Votes	%	Seats	+/–	Position	Government
2024	Razi Nurullayev	11,554	0.49	1 / 125	New	▲11th	Opposition
