= Azerbaijani Social Democratic Party =

Political party in Azerbaijan

Social Democratic Party Azərbaycan Sosial Demokrat Partiyası
- Chairman: Araz Alizadeh
- Founder: Araz Alizadeh; Zardusht Alizadeh
- Founded: 10 December 1989
- Dissolved: 4 April 2023
- Ideology: Social democracy Secularism
- Political position: Centre-left
- Continental affiliation: Forum of Socialists of the CIS Countries
- International affiliation: Socialist International

The Azerbaijani Social Democratic Party (Azerbaijani: Azərbaycan Sosial Demokrat Partiyası, ASDP) was an Azerbaijani secularist and a social democratic political party led by the former President of Azerbaijan Ayaz Mutalibov. At the elections held on 5 November 2000 and 7 January 2001, the party won less than 1% of popular vote and failed to gain seats in the parliament.

On 4 April 2023, after the adoption of the new law "On political parties" in Azerbaijan and the death of party chairman Araz Alizadeh, the party announced its dissolution.

== See also ==
- Azerbaijani Social Democratic Party politicians
