= Elchin Shikhly =

Azerbaijani newspaper editor

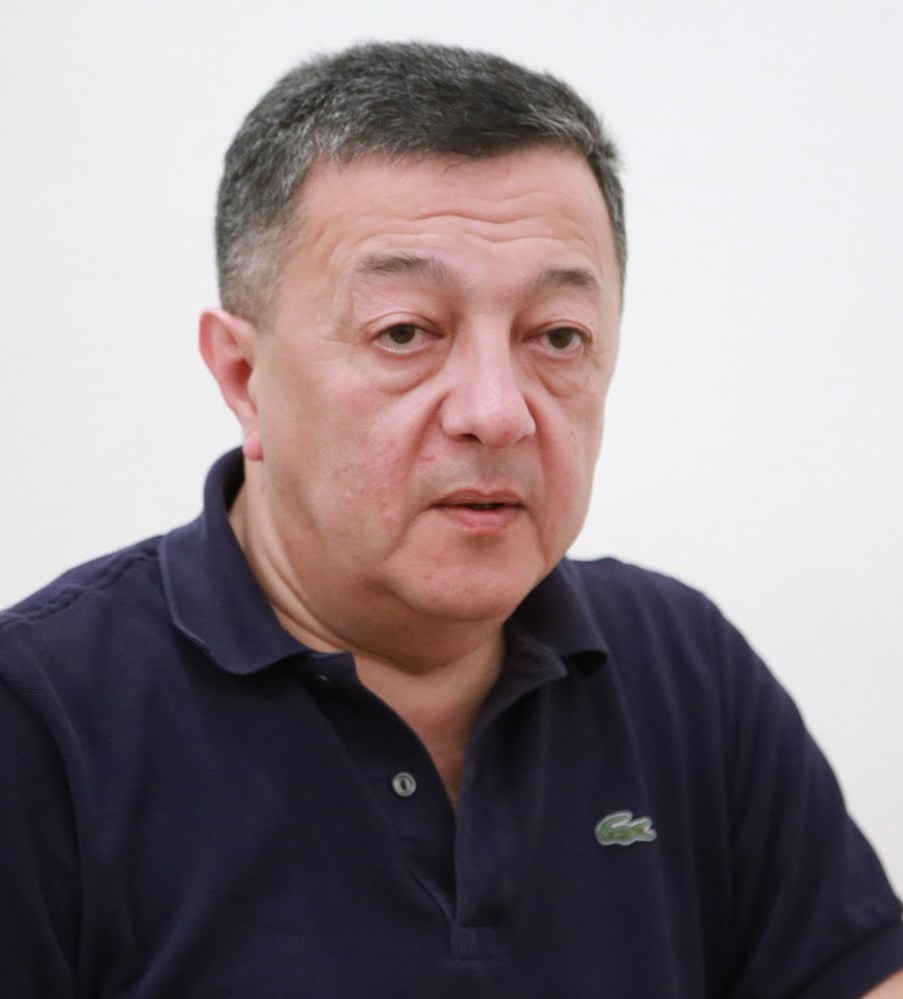

Elchin Shikhly (born October 4, 1957) is the creator and editor-in-chief of "Ayna"-"Zerkalo" newspapers since 2001. He is a member of the Azerbaijani Writers' Union since 1989, and is the chairman of the Azerbaijani Journalists' Union since 2006.

== Life ==
Shikhly was born on October 4, 1957, in Baku. He graduated from School No.190 in 1974. Elchin received his education at Azerbaijan Pedagogical Foreign Languages Institute English faculty between 1974 and 1979. He has worked as an inspector of the department of information and advertisement at Foreign Tourist Office under the Council of Ministers of Azerbaijan SSR.

In October 1979 Elchin Shikhly joined the Soviet Army and during that time he worked as a translator. Elchin Shikhly is a writer and is Ismayil Shikhly's son. He is married and has two children.

== Activity ==
- On July–August, 1981 – "İnturist" USC Baku, translator
- In 1981–1986 – Azerbaijan Society of Friendship and Cultural Relations with Foreign Countries, reviewer
- In 1986–1988 – Ministry of Education of Azerbaijan SSR, scribe
- In 1988–1989 – The Board of Directors of the section named after Lenin Azerbaijan Republic Soviet Children's Fund, chief reviewer
- In 1989–1990 – "The Communist of Azerbaijan" magazine
- In 1990–1998 – "Ayna"-"Zerkalo" newspapers, deputy editor-in-chief
- In 1998–1999 – "Al-ver" newspaper, editor-in-chief
- In 1999–2001 – "Ayna Mətbu Evi" company, president
