= Sviatoslav Yurash =

Ukrainian politician

- Святослав Юраш
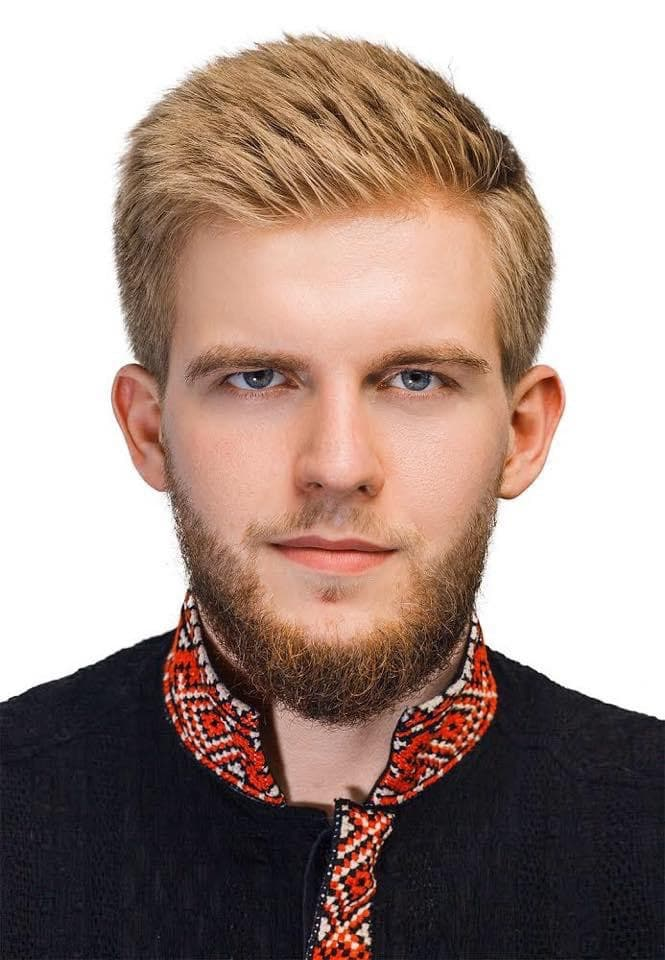

People's Deputy of Ukraine
- Incumbent
- Assumed office 29 August 2019
- Constituency: Servant of the People, No. 27

Personal details
- Born: 16 February 1996 (age 30) Lviv, Ukraine
- Party: Servant of the People

Sviatoslav Andriiovych Yurash (Ukrainian: Святосла́в Андрі́йович Юра́ш, IPA: [sʲwʲɐtosˈlɑu̯ ɐnˈd⁽ʲ⁾r⁽ʲ⁾ijowɪtʃ jʊˈrɑʃ]; born 16 February 1996) is a Ukrainian politician who represents the Servant of the People party in the Verkhovna Rada (Ukraine's parliament), to which he was elected in 2019. As of 2022, Yurash is the youngest Ukrainian MP. He was previously the Euromaidan press centre organiser and senior spokesperson for Volodymyr Zelenskyy's successful 2019 presidential election campaign. Yurash co-founded the cross-party conservative grouping Values. Dignity. Family. in the Ukrainian parliament.

== Biography ==
Sviatoslav Yurash was born in Lviv, Ukraine, on 16 February 1996. He studied international relations in Poland and was studying in Kolkata when the Euromaidan protests broke out and he returned to Ukraine.

On the occasion of International Women's Day in March 2021, Yurash argued that Ukrainian ratification of the Istanbul Convention would not help reduce domestic violence in the country, commenting that it was "a document that introduces a whole galaxy of terms that create a niche for postmodern superstructures in the legislation. The convention is a Trojan Horse that does not help with domestic violence". He instead argued: "Let's talk about domestic violence, about the police who do not come on calls, about alcoholism". Yurash and fellow Values. Dignity. Family. co-founder Oleh Voloshyn, of the Opposition Platform — For Life party, had previously met Brian S. Brown of the US Christian right organisation World Congress of Families, on the latter's visit to Ukraine. When the group was founded, Yurash confirmed that it would oppose any introduction of same-sex marriages and LGBTQ adoption rights in Ukraine. According to the head of Ukraine's LGBT Military Equal Rights Association, citing an investigation by Bellingcat, "American conservatives are investing in movements such as 'Love against homosexuality' and members of the Verkhovna Rada, Ukraine's parliament. These representatives include Sviatoslav Yurash, who created a parliamentary group called "Values. Dignity. Family" that even took part in the National Prayer Breakfast in Washington DC".

During the early days of the 2022 Russian invasion of Ukraine, along with other People's Deputies, he was photographed patrolling the streets of Kyiv armed with a Kalashnikov. In March 2022, Yurash's former girlfriend, Oleksandra Kuvshynova, was killed when the car that she was in was hit by Russian shelling. Yurash has subsequently worked with the Ukrainian Foreign Legion, helping to co-ordinate foreign fighters and to deliver supplies to frontline cities, towns and villages.

While in India, he earned the nickname "Sweet Love" after locals attempted to find an alternative after they could not pronounce his first name.
