= Araz Alizadeh =

Azerbaijani translator and politician (1951–2022)

Araz Alizade
- Araz Əlizadə
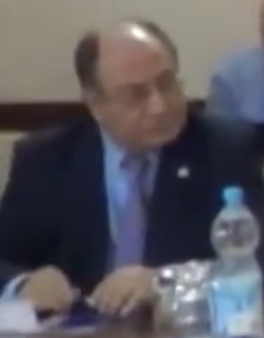

Member of the Supreme Soviet of Azerbaijan
- In office 1991–1995

Personal details
- Born: 3 November 1951 Baku, Azerbaijan SSR, Soviet Union
- Died: 6 October 2022 (aged 70) Baku, Azerbaijan
- Party: ASDP
- Education: Baku State University
- Occupation: Translator

Araz Alizade (Azerbaijani: Araz Əlizadə; 3 November 1951 – 6 October 2022) was an Azerbaijani politician. A member of the Azerbaijani Social Democratic Party, he served on the Supreme Soviet of Azerbaijan from 1991 to 1995.

Alizade died in Baku on 6 October 2022, at the age of 70.
