= Sardar Jalaloglu =

Azeri doctor and politician

Sardar Jalaloglu (Azerbaijan)
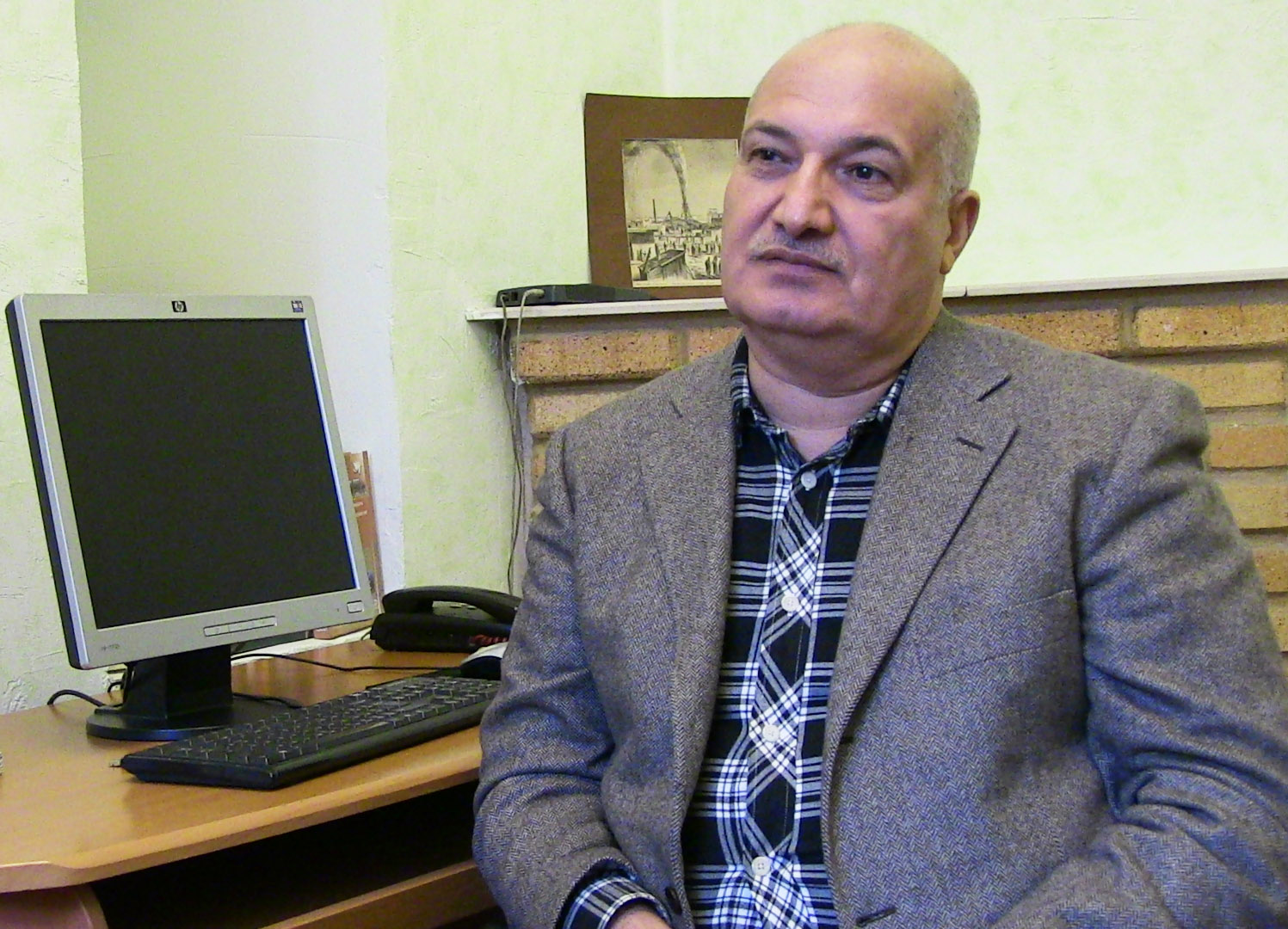

Chairman of the Azerbaijan Democratic Party

Personal details
- Born: June 3, 1954 (age 72) Nakhchivan, Azerbaijan
- Party: Azerbaijan Democratic Party
- Spouse: Fatma Mammadova
- Children: 4
- Profession: Doctor, politician

Sardar Jalaloglu (Azerbaijani: Sərdar Cəlaloğlu; born June 3, 1954) is an Azeri doctor and politician. He was born in the village of Cehri of Babek district of Nakhchivan. He went to school in Ordubad and finished secondary school in Baku. In 1997, he graduated from Azerbaijan State Medical Institute. After graduation, he worked as a doctor for 15 years. In recent years, his statements about women and women rights have drawn significant controversy in the media (see Political views).

== Political career ==
- In 1985, he joined Azerbaijan National Movement. He was one of the initiators for establishing Azerbaijan National Movement and till 1991 was member of Nakhchivan National Movement’s governing body.
- In 1991, he was one of the founders of Azerbaijan Democratic Party, was elected the general secretary of the Azerbaijan Democratic Party in 1994-96, from 1996 to 2005 first deputy chairman of the Party and from 2005 to 2007 deputy chairman of the Party.
- He was arrested illegally in the events of 15–16 October 2003, was recognized as a political prisoner by a number of international organizations including European Union and the ECHR and finally was released in March, 2005.
- On May 27, 2007 in the Ninth Congress of the ADP, he was elected the chairman of the Party.
- Been nominated for 2008 Presidential election from ADP.
- One of the founders of newspapers such as: Hurriyyet, Haray and Oyanish.
- Author of hundreds of articles, book reviews about Globalization, Philosophy, Monographies in Ethnography, etc.
- Sardar Jalaloglu been arrested 3 times for his outspoken speeches and political views.
- Married, has 4 children.

== Political views ==
Jalaloglu holds conservative traditional views on gender roles and has repeatedly made restrictive statements about women's rights and conduct. In 2020, he stated that a woman is less dexterous than man and needs male supervision. In 2026, his remarks about women's appearance at home and in public drew controversy in the Azerbaijani media.

== Works ==
- "Mahiyyət" (English: "Essence")
- "Azadlığa məhkumuq" (English: "Sentenced to Freedom")
- "İnsanlar və adamlar" (English: "Humans and Persons")
- "Türkəçarə" (English: "Quackery")
