= National Revival Movement Party =

National Revival Movement Party Milli Dirçəliş Hərəkatı Partiyası
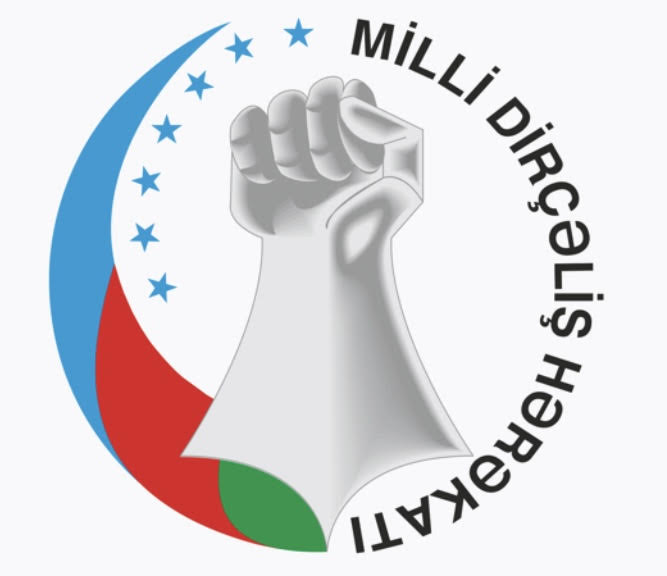
- Abbreviation: MDHP
- Leader: Faraj Guliyev
- Founded: 7 May 2003
- Membership (2023): Over 6,000
- Parliament: 0 / 125

Website
- http://mdhp.az

The National Revival Movement Party (Azerbaijani: Milli Dirçəliş Hərəkatı Partiyası, MDHP) is a political party in Azerbaijan led by Faraj Guliyev.

== History ==
In the 2010 parliamentary elections the party won one of the 125 seats in the National Assembly. The party nominated Guliyev as its candidate in the 2013 presidential elections, but he received just 0.86% of the vote. It retained its seat in the 2015 parliamentary elections, and Guliyev ran for the presidency again in the 2018 elections, in which he received 1.16% of the vote. The party lost its parliamentary representation in the 2020 elections.

== Election results ==
=== Presidential elections ===
| Election | Party candidate | Votes | % | Result |
|---|---|---|---|---|
| 2013 | Faraj Guliyev | 31,926 | 0.86% | Lost ✗ |
| 2018 | Faraj Guliyev | 45,967 | 1.16% | Lost ✗ |

=== National Assembly elections ===
| Election | Leader | Votes | % | Seats | +/– | Position | Status |
|---|---|---|---|---|---|---|---|
| 2015 | Faraj Guliyev | 12,043 | 0.42 | 1 / 125 | New | ▲13th | Opposition |
| 2020 | Faraj Guliyev | 4,980 | 0.21 | 0 / 125 | ▼1 | ▼16th | Extra-parliamentary |
| 2024 | Faraj Guliyev | 178 | 0.01 | 0 / 125 | 0 | ▼25th | Extra-parliamentary |
