= Faraj Guliyev =

Azerbaijani politician

- Fərəc Quliyev
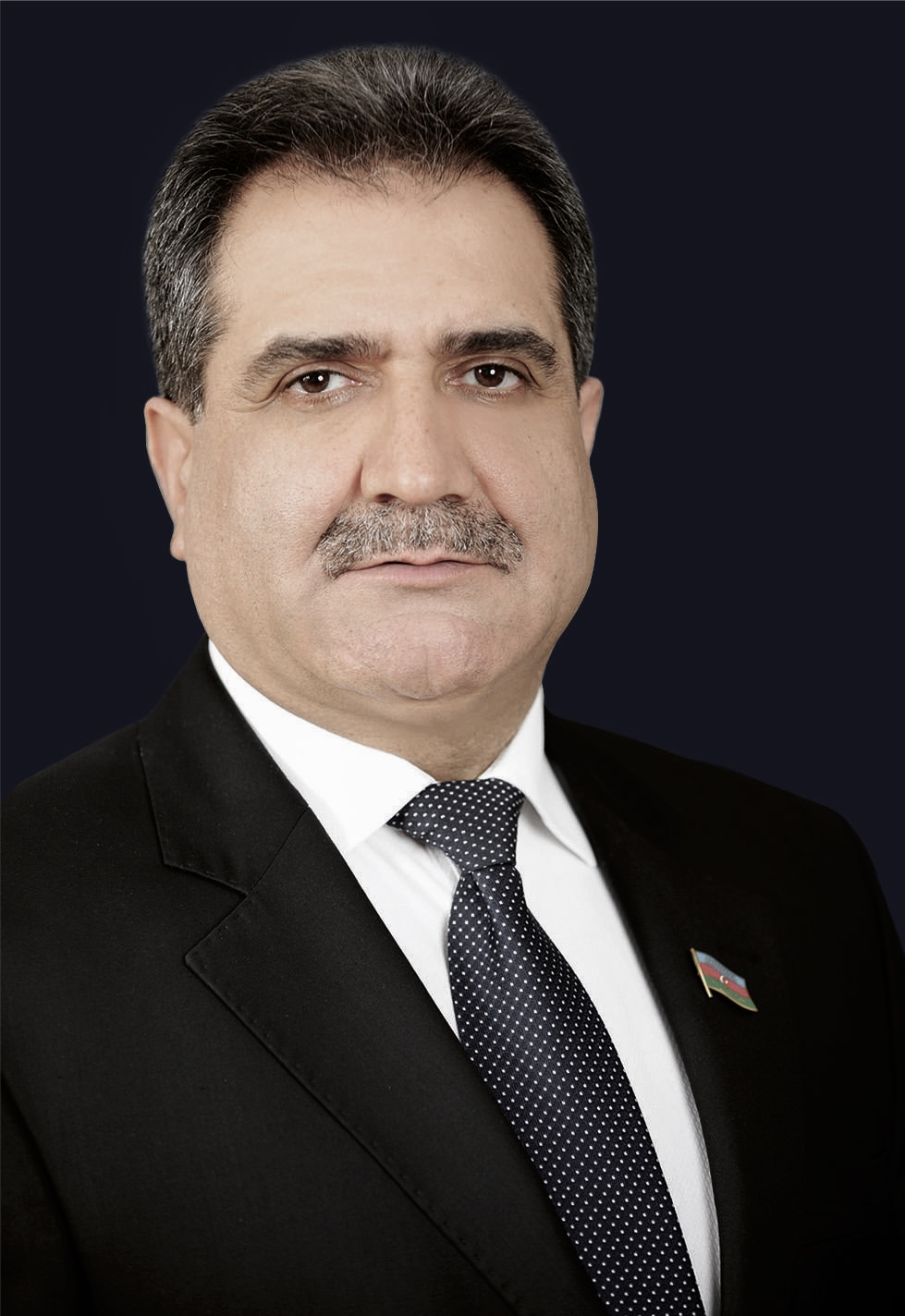

Leader of the National Revival Movement Party

Personal details
- Born: Guliyev Faraj İbrahim oglu 22 December 1962 (age 63) Ordubad, Nakhichevan ASSR, Azerbaijan SSR, Soviet Union
- Citizenship: Azerbaijan
- Party: National Revival Movement Party
- Education: Azerbaijan Medical University
- Website: MDHP.AZ

Faraj Guliyev (Azerbaijani: Fərəc İbrahim oğlu Quliyev; born 22 December 1962) is an Azerbaijani politician. Guliyev is a leader and chairman of the nationalist opposition party – National Revival Movement Party. In 2013 and 2018 he was presidential candidate.

== Early life ==
Guliyev was born on 22 December 1962 in Ordubad, Nakhchivan Autonomous Republic of Azerbaijan. He is author of over 7 books. Foreign languages: Turkish, Russian and German.

== Political activity ==
In 1995, he was convicted and spent several years in prison as opposition leader. In 2002, he was pardoned. In 2010 and 2015, Faraj Guliyev was elected as a deputy of the parliament as chairman of the National Revival Movement party.

He was a candidate in the Azerbaijani presidential elections in 2013 and 2018. He stated that Turkish films do not need to be voiced. Deputy Ferec Guliyev suggested that "Azerbaijani soldiers should fight against the terrorist organization PKK together with the Turkish army". Ferec Guliyev expressed some of the issues that have been discussed and desired in the Turkish World for many years and stated that "Turkish World relations should be transferred to the political and military field".

== National Revival Movement Party ==
National Revival Movement Party (Azerbaijani: Milli Dirçəliş Hərəkatı Partiyası) is a political party in Azerbaijan. The party's leader is Faraj Guliyev, who is well-known politician. At the 2010 parliamentary elections, it won 1 out of 125 seats. In the 2015 parliamentary elections, it won 1 out of 125 seats.
