= Zahid Oruj =

Azerbaijani politician (born 1972)

- Zahid Oruc
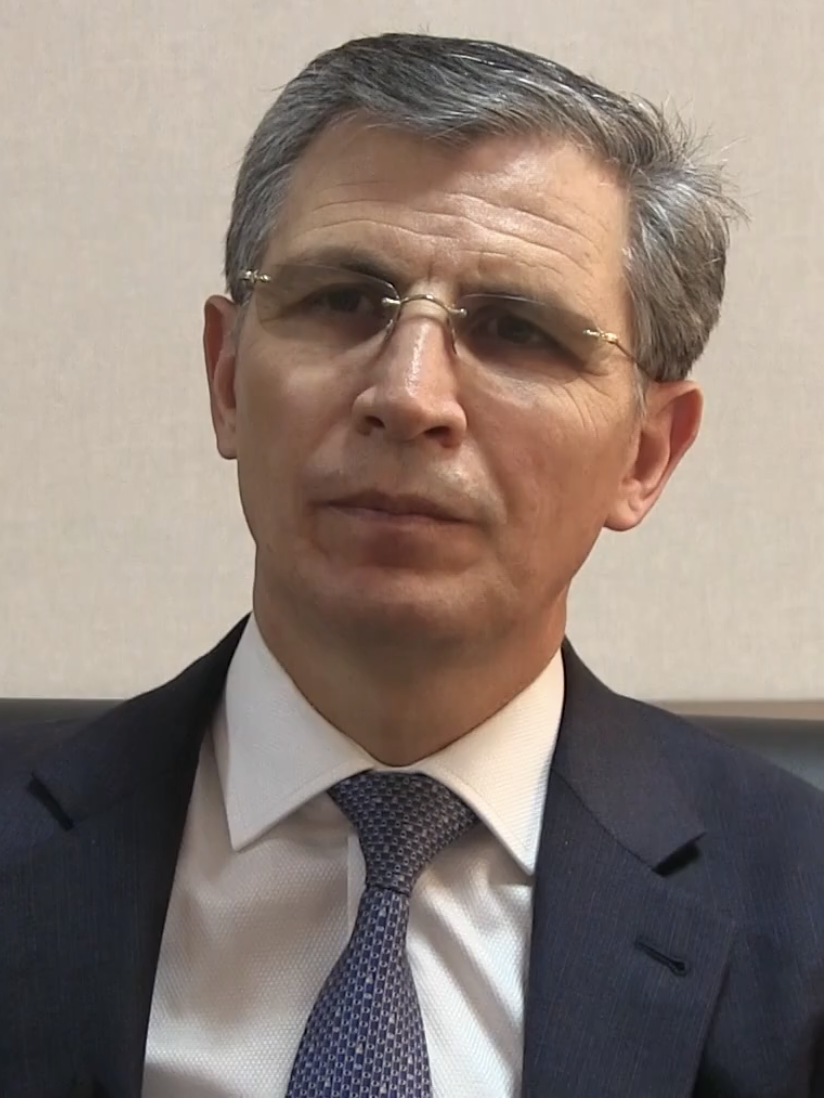
- Oruj in 2023

Member of the National Assembly
- Incumbent
- Assumed office 5 March 2003

Personal details
- Born: 1 February 1972 (age 54) Alnabat, Azerbaijan SSR, USSR
- Party: Motherland Party (1992–2013); Independent (2013–present)

Zahid Maharram oglu Orujov (Azerbaijani: Zahid Məhərrəm oğlu Orucov, commonly known as Zahid Oruj; born 1 February 1972) is an Azerbaijan politician and chairperson of the Azerbaijani Social Research Center (2019). Oruj is pro-government. He was a member of the pro-government Motherland Party from 1992 to 2013.

In the 2005 parliamentary elections, Oruj won the vote in the Barda electoral district while running as a candidate for the pro-government Motherland Party. The European Court of Human Rights ruled in 2010 that the Aliyev regime in Azerbaijan had engaged in electoral fraud by preventing Nemat Aliyev, a member of the opposition Azerbaijan Popular Front Party, from running.

In 2018, Oruj ran for president against Ilham Aliyev and officially received 3.12% of the vote, although this election was characterized as fraudulent by the observers. During the election, Oruj asked his supporters to vote for Aliyev and praised his regime.
