= Central Election Commission (Azerbaijan) =

Central Election Commission of the Republic of Azerbaijan
- Azərbaycan Respublikası Mərkəzi Seçki Komissiyası
- Commission Emblem

Agency overview
- Formed: 26 June 1990; 15 May 1998 (current form)
- Jurisdiction: Government of Azerbaijan
- Headquarters: 7, S.S. Akhundov, Baku, Azerbaijan, 1115
- Agency executives: Manzahir Pahanov, Chairman; Rovzat Gasimov, Deputy Chairman
- Website: msk.gov.az

The Central Election Commission of the Republic of Azerbaijan (CEC; Azerbaijani: Azərbaycan Respublikası Mərkəzi Seçki Komissiyası, AR MSK) is a state body operating on a permanent basis in accordance with the Constitution of the Republic of Azerbaijan. Mazahir Panahov is the chairman of the commission. The agency is responsible for overseeing and conducting national and municipal elections across Azerbaijan.

== Main duty ==
The CEC of the Republic of Azerbaijan ensures preparation and realization of presidential elections, the elections of the members of Milli Mejlis (National Assembly) of the Republic of Azerbaijan, referendums (nationwide opinion poll), and municipal elections. The duties of commissions are carried out by the Central Election Commission of the Republic of Azerbaijan.

== History ==
Central Election Commission Azerbaijan SSR on Elections of People's Deputies first was established on 26 June 1990 in accordance with the decision of the Supreme Soviet of Azerbaijan SSR. It was renamed it to Central Election Commission of the Republic of Azerbaijan on 15 May 1998 according to the legislature of the Republic of Azerbaijan.
