= 2003 Azerbaijani protests =

Series of protests in 2003

- Date: October 15, 2003 – October 19, 2003
- Location: Azerbaijan
- Caused by: Alleged electoral fraud during the 2003 Azerbaijani presidential election
- Goals: Resignation of President Heydar Aliyev; Fresh general elections; Annulment of the 2003 Azerbaijani presidential election
- Methods: Demonstrations
- Result: Protests suppressed by force

Deaths and injuries
- Deaths: 2
- Injuries: Thousands

The 2003 Azerbaijani protests was a series of opposition demonstrations against the 2003 Azerbaijani presidential election results and a violent crackdown against the protesters. On the evening of 15 October, anti-government protests erupted, in which two people were killed when police opened fire with rubber bullets in an attempt to dispel the peaceful sit-ins. These protests were the biggest since the 1998 Azerbaijani presidential election protests.

== Background ==
In Azerbaijan elections have always been rigged, in favour of the president or alleged voter/ballot box fraud is discovered during the elections. Since the Dissolution of the Soviet Union, Azerbaijan has been plagued by internal scandals, corruption, violence and other issues which have angered many. The Azerbaijani opposition led demonstrations against the government in 1998, after the 1998 Azerbaijani presidential election but after the results of the 2003 Azerbaijani presidential election and the re-election of president Heydar Aliyev, the opposition had enough.

== Protests ==
On the evening of 15 October, mass demonstrations erupted nationwide after the announcement of the results but the epicentre was Baku, where most of the opposition unrest was taking place. Anti-government protests by hundreds took place in town squares and main parks. Thousands of riot police was deployed to clamp down on the demonstrators. Anti-presidential chants were heard and the response came quickly and violently, as tear gas and beatings was deployed. Hundreds were arrested after calling for the annulment of the elections.

On 16 October, mass civil unrest continued; thousands continued to rally. Popular demonstrations erupted nationwide with large-scale unrest met with a police crackdown. Military forces and security officials were sent to quell hunger strikes and lay-offs, unrest and anti-government demonstrations.

Small rallies went on for a couple of days after, demanding democratic reforms and free elections. They were met with violence and attacks by police. Azerbaijan's parliament stripped an opposition lawmaker of immunity.

== Aftermath ==
The violence has been investigated and that police forces will be charged over the police brutality and the severe violence, crackdown that followed the post-election uprising. According to some sources, two died in the violence by security forces and the protests.

== See also ==
- 2003 Azerbaijani presidential election
