= Ilham Aliyev =

President of Azerbaijan since 2003

- İlham Əliyev
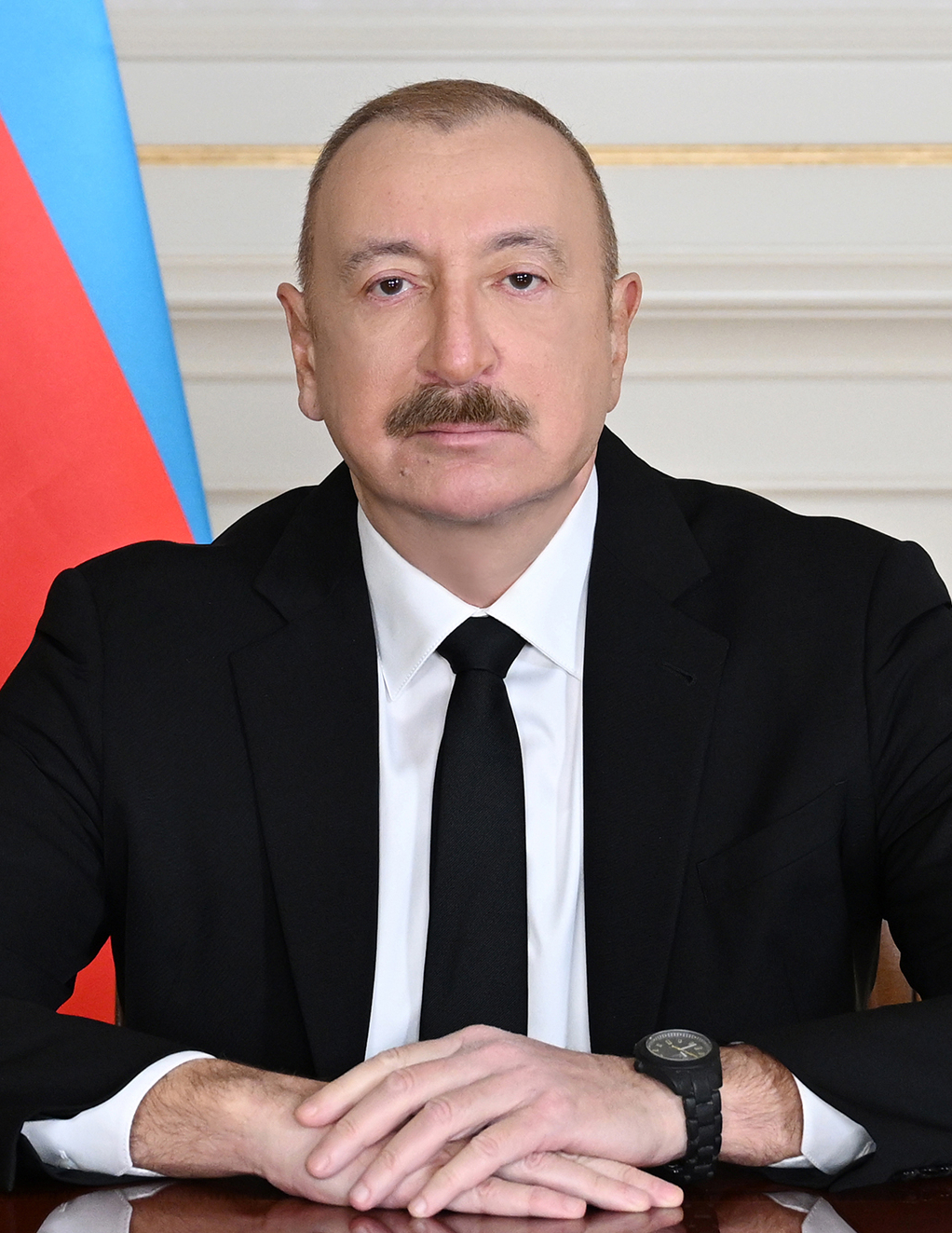
- Formal portrait, 2025

4th President of Azerbaijan
- Incumbent
- Assumed office 31 October 2003
- Prime Minister: Artur Rasizade; Novruz Mammadov; Ali Asadov
- Vice President: Mehriban Aliyeva
- Preceded by: Heydar Aliyev

Leader of the New Azerbaijan Party
- Incumbent
- Assumed office 12 December 2003 (Note: Acting: 12 December 2003 – 26 March 2005)
- Deputy: Mehriban Aliyeva
- Preceded by: Heydar Aliyev

7th Prime Minister of Azerbaijan
- In office 4 August 2003 – 31 October 2003
- President: Heydar Aliyev
- Preceded by: Artur Rasizade
- Succeeded by: Artur Rasizade

Second Gentleman of Azerbaijan
- Incumbent
- Assumed office 21 February 2017
- Vice President: Mehriban Aliyeva
- Preceded by: Office established

Chairman of the Organization of Turkic States
- Incumbent
- Assumed office 7 October 2025
- Preceded by: Sadyr Japarov
- In office 15 October 2019 – 12 November 2021
- Preceded by: Sooronbay Jeenbekov
- Succeeded by: Recep Tayyip Erdoğan
- In office 16 August 2013 – 5 June 2014
- Preceded by: Almazbek Atambayev
- Succeeded by: Abdullah Gül

Secretary General of the Non-Aligned Movement
- In office 25 October 2019 – 16 January 2024
- Preceded by: Nicolás Maduro
- Succeeded by: Yoweri Museveni

Personal details
- Born: İlham Heydər oğlu Əliyev; 24 December 1961 (age 64) Baku, Azerbaijan SSR, Soviet Union
- Party: New Azerbaijan Party
- Spouse: Mehriban Pashayeva (m. 1983)
- Children: Leyla; Arzu; Heydar
- Parents: Heydar Aliyev; Zarifa Aliyeva
- Relatives: Aliyev family
- Education: Moscow State Institute of International Relations
- Occupation: Politician

Ilham Heydar oghlu Aliyev (Note: Azerbaijani: İlham Heydər oğlu Əliyev [ilˈhɑm hejˈdæɾ oɣˈlu æˈlijev]) (born 24 December 1961) is an Azerbaijani politician and statesman who has been the fourth president of Azerbaijan since 2003. He is the son of the previous president, Heydar Aliyev, and has led the New Azerbaijan Party since 2005.

Aliyev briefly served as prime minister for his father before being elected to office in a presidential election defined by irregularities, shortly before his father's death. He was re-elected for a second term in 2008 and was allowed to run in elections indefinitely after the 2009 constitutional referendum removed presidential term limits, winning subsequent elections in 2013, 2018 and 2024. His wife, Mehriban Aliyeva, has been vice president since 2017.

Azerbaijan's oil-rich territory has significantly strengthened the stability of Aliyev's regime and enriched the nation's ruling elite, enabling it to host lavish international events, as well as engage in extensive lobbying efforts. Aliyev's family has also enriched itself through ties to state-run businesses. They hold significant stakes in several major Azerbaijani banks, construction and telecommunications companies, as well as in the country’s oil and gas sector. In 2012, Aliyev was named the "Person of the Year" by Organized Crime and Corruption Reporting Project for featuring prominently in stories on crime and corruption. In 2017, it was revealed that Aliyev and his family were involved in the Azerbaijani laundromat, a complex money-laundering scheme to pay off prominent European politicians to deflect criticism of Aliyev and promote a positive image of his regime.

Aliyev is widely considered a dictator, (Note: See the following:) presiding over an authoritarian government characterized by the absence of free and fair elections, pervasive corruption, and serious human rights violations. Aliyev’s regime is also known for promoting Sunnification, and the suppression of Shia Islam to tighten control, and align with Turkey. His regime is known for the harassment of journalists and non-governmental organizations, as well as the ethnic cleansing of the Armenians of Nagorno-Karabakh. During Aliyev's presidency, the Nagorno-Karabakh conflict escalated into a full-fledged war in 2020 and — following a military siege and renewed offensive in 2023 — expelled all Armenians from Nagorno-Karabakh and reincorporated the territory into Azerbaijan.

== Early life and career ==
Ilham Aliyev is the son of Heydar Aliyev, president of Azerbaijan from 1993 to 2003. His mother Zarifa Aliyeva was an Azerbaijani ophthalmologist. He also has an older sister, Sevil Aliyeva. In 1977, Ilham Aliyev entered the Moscow State Institute of International Relations (MGIMO-MSIIR) and in 1982, continued his education as a postgraduate. In 1985, he received a PhD degree in history. From 1985 to 1990 Aliyev lectured at MSIIR. From 1991 to 1994, he led a group of private industrial-commercial enterprises. In 1994–2003, he was vice-president, and later the first vice-president of SOCAR, the state-owned Azerbaijani oil and gas company. Since 1997, Aliyev has been the president of the National Olympic Committee of Azerbaijan.

== Early political career ==
In 1999, Ilham Aliyev was elected as the deputy chair of the ruling New Azerbaijan Party and in 2001, he was elected to the post of first deputy chair at the Second Congress of the Party. At the third Congress of the New Azerbaijan Party held on March 26, 2005, President Aliyev and the first deputy of the Party was unanimously elected to the post of chairman of the Party. The fourth and fifth congresses of the party held in 2008 and 2013 unanimously supported his nomination for the next presidential term. In 1995, Aliyev was elected to the Parliament of the Republic of Azerbaijan; later he became president of the National Olympic Committee (still incumbent). From 2001 to 2003, Aliyev was head of the Azerbaijani delegation to the Parliamentary Assembly of the Council of Europe (PACE).

=== Prime Minister of Azerbaijan (2003) ===
In 2002, a constitutional referendum in Azerbaijan made the prime minister next in line for the presidency if the president became incapacitated. By early 2003, Heydar Aliyev's health had significantly declined, fueling speculation about his ability to continue serving office.

On 4 August 2003, Ilham Aliyev, his son, was appointed prime minister amidst his Heydar's illness, absence from public life, and rumours of his death, a move that many saw as preparing him to eventually succeed his father as president. After his appointment, Ilham Aliyev dismissed the rumours about his Heydar's death, emphasizing his father's recovery in a televised address.

Ilham Aliyev's appointment as prime minister was confirmed by a National Assembly vote, with 101 out of 125 deputies supporting his nomination. However, opposition parties boycotted the vote, expressing concerns that this move was part of an effort to establish a political dynasty and limit democratic processes. They argued that Ilham's appointment was an attempt to maintain power within the Aliyev family, bypassing a more open and competitive political system.

During his brief tenure as prime minister, Ilham Aliyev focused on continuing policies implemented by Heydar, particularly in terms of Azerbaijan's economy and foreign relations. He assured both the public and international community that there would be no significant changes in government direction. Despite this, the opposition criticized the appointment, calling it an "undemocratic power grab". Observers also pointed to the ongoing concentration of power within the ruling elite as a concern for Azerbaijan's political future.

Ilham Aliyev sought for the presidency in the October 2003 election, but Azerbaijan's election law prohibited him from doing so while serving as prime minister. As a result, he remained in the position, but his duties were temporarily assumed by Artur Rasizade, who became acting prime minister following Aliyev's leave of absence on August 6, 2003. This arrangement allowed Aliyev to focus on his presidential campaign while retaining his position as prime minister until the election.

== President of Azerbaijan (2003–present) ==
=== First term (2003–2008) ===
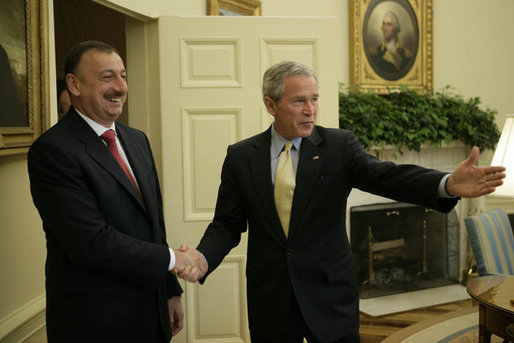
President George W. Bush welcomes President Ilham Aliyev

The official results of the October 15, 2003 elections gave victory to Ilham Aliyev, who earned 76.84% of the votes. The election was defined by election fraud. Human Rights Watch and the Institute for Democracy in Eastern Europe documented arrests of opposition candidates, police violence against journalists and participants in election rallies, and "widespread fraud and abuse" in the conduct of the election itself. Despite these allegations, Aliyev was inaugurated as President of Azerbaijan on 31 October 2003. Following his inauguration, Aliyev appointed Artur Rasizade as Prime Minister, whose nomination was approved by the parliament on 4 November 2003. Rasizade had previously held the position of Prime Minister under Aliyev's father, Heydar Aliyev, and continued to serve in an acting capacity.

Aliyev worked to consolidate his power both politically and economically. One of his first major actions was the creation of the "Foundation for Combating Corruption in Azerbaijan" in 2004. This initiative was aimed at addressing widespread corruption within government institutions and improving public sector accountability. Despite the establishment of this foundation, critics argued that the reforms were insufficient, and corruption remained prevalent within the ruling elite.

In the energy sector, Aliyev focused on solidifying Azerbaijan's role as an important player in the global oil market. A key milestone in his first term was the completion of the Baku–Tbilisi–Ceyhan pipeline in May 2005. This major infrastructure project allowed Azerbaijan to export oil to international markets, particularly to Europe and the United States, and significantly boosted the country's economic profile. The pipeline further reinforced Azerbaijan's strategic importance as an energy supplier, linking the Caspian Sea region to the global market while bypassing Russia and Iran.

Politically, Aliyev faced significant challenges from opposition groups, particularly in the 2005 parliamentary elections. The elections were marred by widespread allegations of fraud, electoral malpractice, and the restriction of opposition parties’ activities. Despite the opposition's gains in certain regions, the elections were widely considered unfair. Protests erupted in response to the results, with demonstrators accusing the government of rigging the vote. However, the protests were quickly suppressed by the government's security forces, and many opposition leaders were arrested. Aliyev's government responded by tightening control over the media and cracking down on dissent.

=== Second term (2008–2013) ===
Ilham Aliyev was re-elected in 2008 with 87% of the vote. Seven candidates registered to run, each required to gather 40,000 voter signatures. According to the European Parliament Election Observation Delegation, the election was conducted without major unrest and with only minor procedural issues. The delegation acknowledged reforms to the Electoral Code, such as the use of ink to prevent repeat voting, improved transparency in voter lists, and legal provisions limiting government involvement in the electoral process. During the 2008 election, the Parliamentary Assembly of the Council of Europe (PACE) included members with differing views. A draft statement by delegation head Andreas Herkel, which contained critical remarks, was not adopted after opposition from several members including Michael Hancock, Eduard Lintner, and Paul Ville. Herkel reportedly offered to resign if the delegation’s findings were not fully reflected.

In March 2009, a constitutional referendum under Aliyev's administration removed presidential term limits, allowing him to seek re-election indefinitely. This move was praised by some PACE delegates as a step towards democratic development but raised serious concerns from the Council of Europe’s Venice Commission and the European Commission about the potential consolidation of executive power and erosion of democratic safeguards. The referendum was conducted without broad public consultation, drawing criticism from opposition parties who argued it violated both domestic constitutional norms and Azerbaijan’s international commitments.

During Aliyev's second term, Azerbaijan experienced significant pro-democracy protests in 2011, as citizens demanded political reforms, economic changes, the release of political detainees and resignation of Aliyev. The government responded with force, dispersing protests and detaining hundreds, which prompted condemnation from numerous international human rights organizations for restricting peaceful assembly and curtailing media freedoms.

Economically, Azerbaijan’s growth during this period remained heavily dependent on its oil and gas sector. However, concerns were raised by Global Witness and other watchdogs about governance and transparency in the energy sector, including allegations of mismanagement of revenues and the use of offshore financial mechanisms.

=== 2013 election ===
In the 2013 presidential elections held on 9 October, Aliyev claimed victory with 85 percent of the vote, securing a third five-year term. The election results were accidentally released before the polls opened. Election observation delegations from the Parliamentary Assembly of the Council of Europe and the European Parliament claimed to have observed a free, fair and transparent electoral process with no evidence of voter intimidation. A day before voting began, however, the Central Election Commission released a new smartphone application intended to allow citizens to watch the ballot counting in real time, and instead the app accidentally showed the results of the election before the election had taken place. The Central Election Commission tried to justify the incident by saying that the initially displayed results were those of the 2008 election, even though the candidates listed, including Jamil Hasanli in second place, were from the 2013 ballot. Aliyev's main rivals in the election were Jamil Hasanli and Iqbal Agazade. Observers from the OSCE / ODIHR spoke of restrictions on freedom of speech during elections. The US State Department described the elections as not meeting international standards, and expressing solidarity with the ODIHR's assessment. In 2013, Amnesty International called on western leaders to speak up against the arrest of Anar Mammadli, prominent human rights activist and head of the independent Election monitoring and Democracy Studies Centre, who was falsely charged with tax evasion and illegal business activity, after his organisation had reported widespread violations during the election. There was a controversy over election observers who had allegedly been paid by the Azerbaijani regime through the Azerbaijani laundromat scandal. A German former lawmaker Eduard Lintner led a mission that claimed that the elections were up to "German standards"; however, Lintner's group had been paid 819,500 euros through the laundromat money laundering scheme. According to the OCCRP, there is "ample evidence of its connection to the family of President Aliyev."

Economically, Aliyev's third term was significantly affected by a sharp decline in global oil prices beginning in 2014, severely impacting Azerbaijan's oil-dependent economy. The resulting drop in government revenues contributed to inflation and depreciation of the national currency, the manat. In response, the government pursued diversification efforts, targeting agriculture, tourism, and information technology sectors, though hydrocarbons remained the dominant economic force. Notably, the Southern Gas Corridor project advanced substantially during this period, aiming to boost Azerbaijan's role as an energy supplier to Europe through pipelines such as TANAP and TAP.

Politically, the Aliyev administration maintained a firm grip on power, continuing to restrict political freedoms and civil society. Opposition parties faced repression, with numerous arrests of journalists, activists, and dissidents. While the government justified these measures as necessary to ensure stability and combat corruption, international watchdogs like Human Rights Watch and Amnesty International criticized these practices as severe setbacks to democratic development.[11][12]

Social unrest surfaced intermittently, including protests in 2016 across Baku and other cities, calling for political reform and improved economic conditions. These demonstrations were met with police crackdowns. Labour strikes and protests over unpaid wages and poor working conditions further highlighted underlying social and economic grievances.

The longstanding Nagorno-Karabakh conflict with Armenia remained unresolved. Despite ongoing negotiations under the OSCE Minsk Group, ceasefire violations persisted, culminating in a notable escalation in April 2016 known as the Four-Day War. Azerbaijani forces sought to regain territory, leading to significant casualties before a ceasefire was reinstated. Aliyev consistently emphasized Azerbaijan's territorial integrity and advocated for a peaceful resolution respecting its sovereignty.

=== 2018 election ===
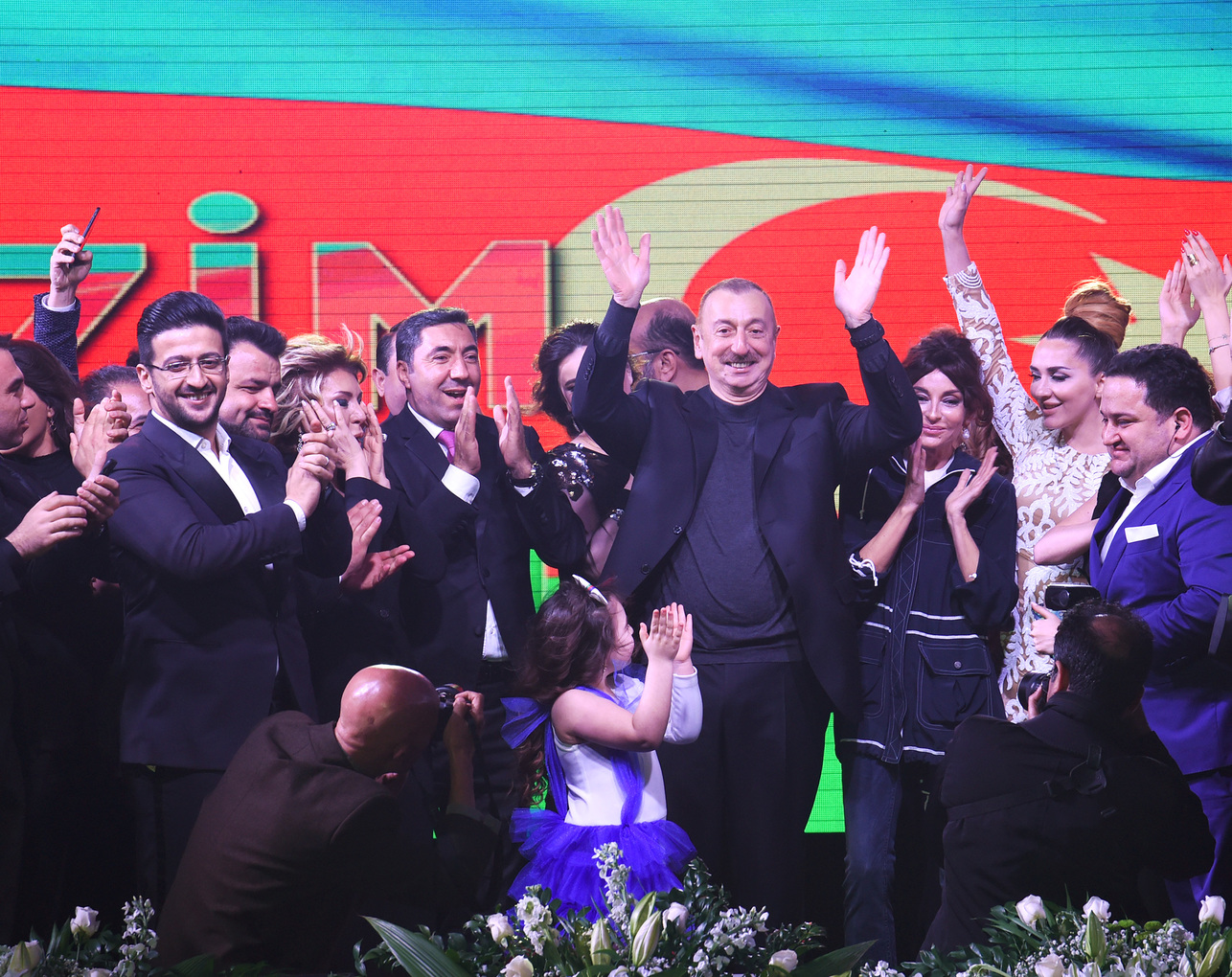
Aliyev celebrates victory in 2018 elections.

Ilham Aliyev got 86.02% of votes in the 2018 presidential election. Major opposition parties did not participate in the election, and evidence indicates that the election was fraudulent.

In January 2019, thousands rallied in Baku calling for the release of political prisoners like blogger Mehman Huseynov, in a permitted protest organized by the National Council of Democratic Forces. Protests escalated in October 2019, with peaceful demonstrations on the 8th, 19th, and 20th triggered by demands for fair elections, economic justice, and greater political freedoms. Police forcibly dispersed crowds, detained approximately 60 protesters including opposition leader Ali Karimli, and cracked down on women's rights activists on 20 October.

In 2020, amid the COVID-19 pandemic, the government enacted emergency measures that critics said were used to suppress dissent and limit civil liberties. Later that year, Azerbaijani forces regained territories in the Second Nagorno-Karabakh War, followed by a high‑profile Victory Parade in December, attended by Turkish President Recep Tayyip Erdoğan, and signaling strengthened ties with Ankara Crisis Group. Throughout his term, Aliyev pursued economic diversification, expanding agriculture, tourism, logistics, and small‑business sectors, while major energy infrastructure projects like the Southern Gas Corridor continued as core state priorities Wikipediahrw.org.

From late 2023 into 2024, authorities intensified repression of independent media. At least six journalists from outlets such as Abzas Media and Toplum TV were arrested on smuggling or tax‑related charges, widely viewed as politically motivated. Journalist trials and detention conditions drew international condemnation, including allegations of ill‑treatment and torture.

=== Nagorno-Karabakh ===
As president, Aliyev has presided over two conflicts involving the region of Nagorno-Karabakh. The Second Nagorno-Karabakh War in 2020 resulted in a ceasefire agreement that left Azerbaijani forces in control of significant portions of the territory which had been previously held by ethnic Armenians and the Republic of Armenia. Another offensive in 2023 resulted in the entire territory coming under Azerbaijani control.

=== Foreign policy ===
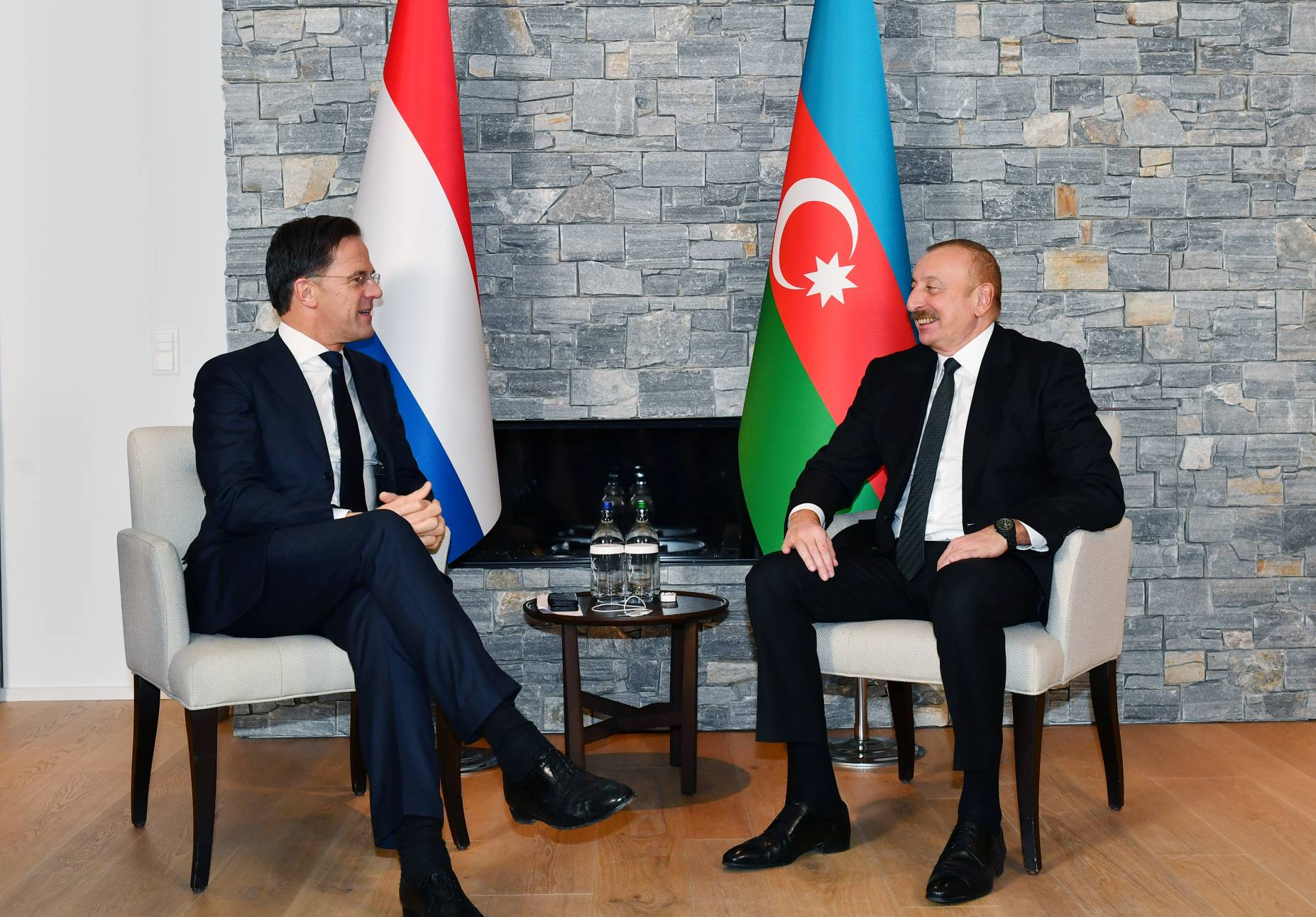
Ilham Aliyev with Dutch Prime Minister Mark Rutte in Davos, Switzerland, 19 January 2023

Azerbaijani foreign relations under Aliyev included strengthened cooperation with the European Union (EU), strong economic ties with Russia, cooperation with NATO via the NATO–Azerbaijan Individual Partnership Action Plan, and close relations with the Organisation of Islamic Cooperation (OIC). Using Azerbaijan's oil wealth, the Azerbaijani regime engages in extensive lobbying efforts, using complex money-laundering and bribery schemes discovered during the Azerbaijani laundromat scandal, such as caviar diplomacy, to pay off prominent European politicians to deflect and whitewash criticism of Aliyev and promote a positive image of his regime and gain support for Azerbaijani projects. During Aliyev's presidency in 2019, Azerbaijan was elected chair of the Turkic Council, as well as the Non-Aligned Movement for a three-year mandate.

==== Armenia ====
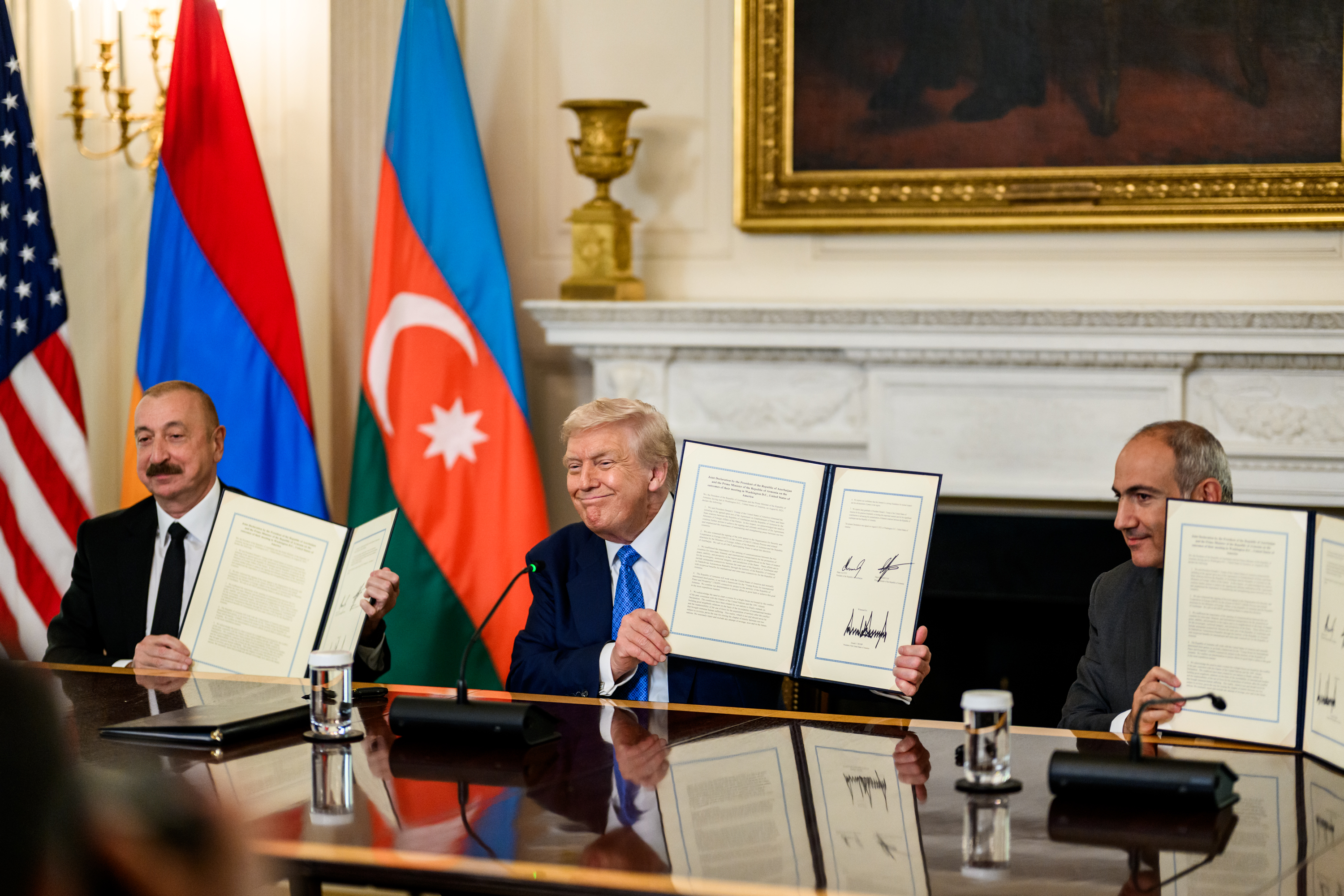
Ilham Aliyev, US President Donald Trump and Armenian Prime Minister Nikol Pashinyan signing a trilateral joint declaration in Washington, D.C., 8 August 2025

In July 2025, Aliyev met with Armenian prime minister Nikol Pashinyan in the United Arab Emirates as part of peace negotiations between their countries. On 8 August 2025, both leaders signed a peace agreement in a ceremony hosted by US president Donald Trump in the White House.

==== United Nations ====
Ilham Aliyev attended and addressed the general debates of the 59th, 65th and 72nd sessions (2004, 2010, 2017) of the UN General Assembly.

==== European Union ====
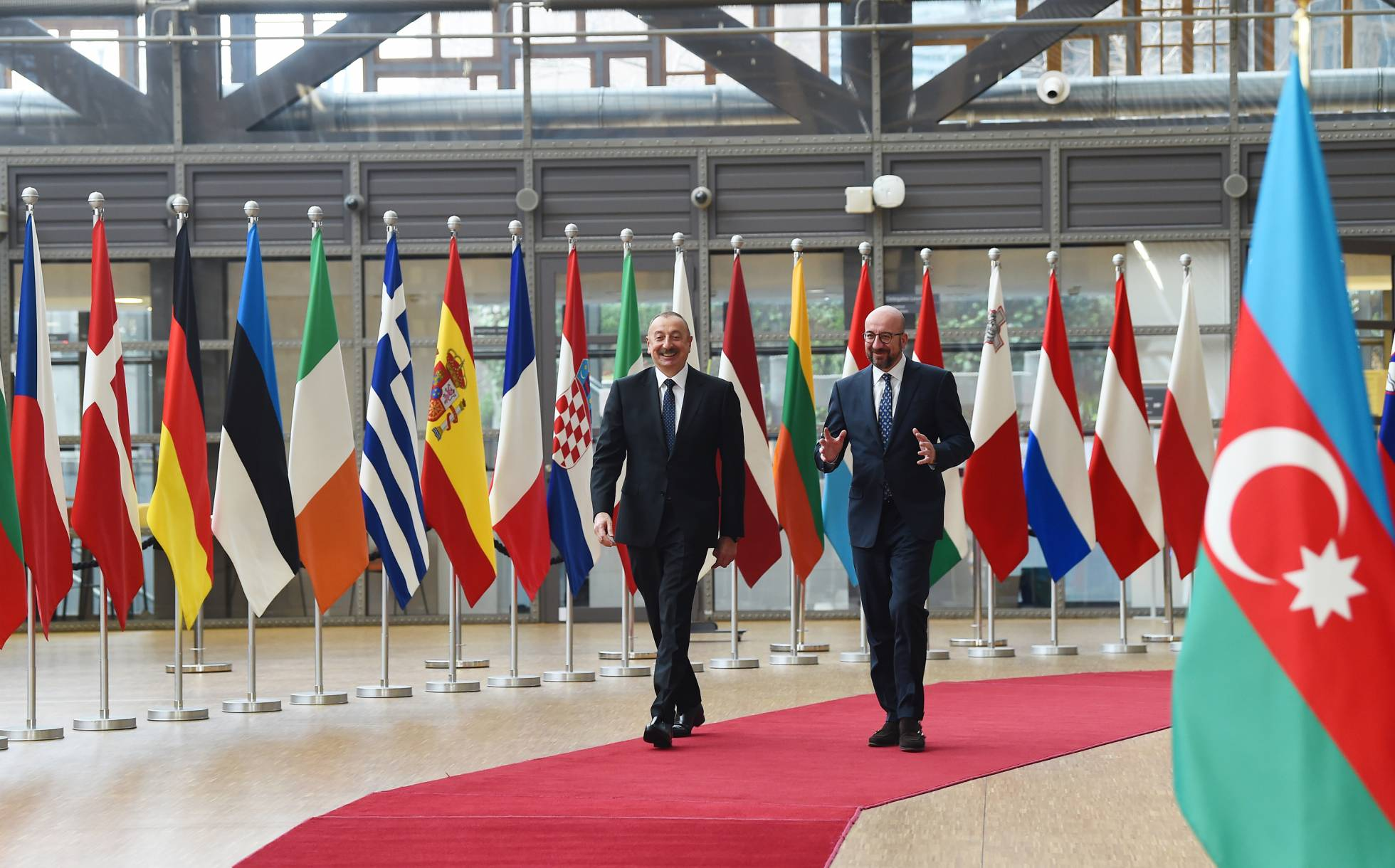
Ilham Aliyev and President of the European Council Charles Michel in Brussels, Belgium (April 2022)

Ilham Aliyev expanded cooperation with the European Union (EU) during his presidency, using caviar diplomacy as a controversial technique of persuading European officials to support Azerbaijani projects. in 2004, Azerbaijan became part of the European Neighbourhood Policy (ENP) of the EU. In 2006, Aliyev and Matti Vanhanen, president of the European Council, and José Manuel Barroso, president of the commission, signed the Memorandum of Understanding on a Strategic Partnership.

In 2009, Azerbaijan was included in the Eastern Partnership Policy. In 2011, Aliyev and José Manuel Barroso concluded the Joint Declaration on the Southern Gas Corridor.

On 6 February 2017, Aliyev visited Brussels, the capital of the EU, where he paid visits to High Representative of the EU for Foreign Affairs and Security Policy, with the president of the European Council, Commission President, and the Commissioner for Energy Union. which resulted in signing the "Partnership Priorities" between EU and Azerbaijan on 11 July 2018.

==== France ====
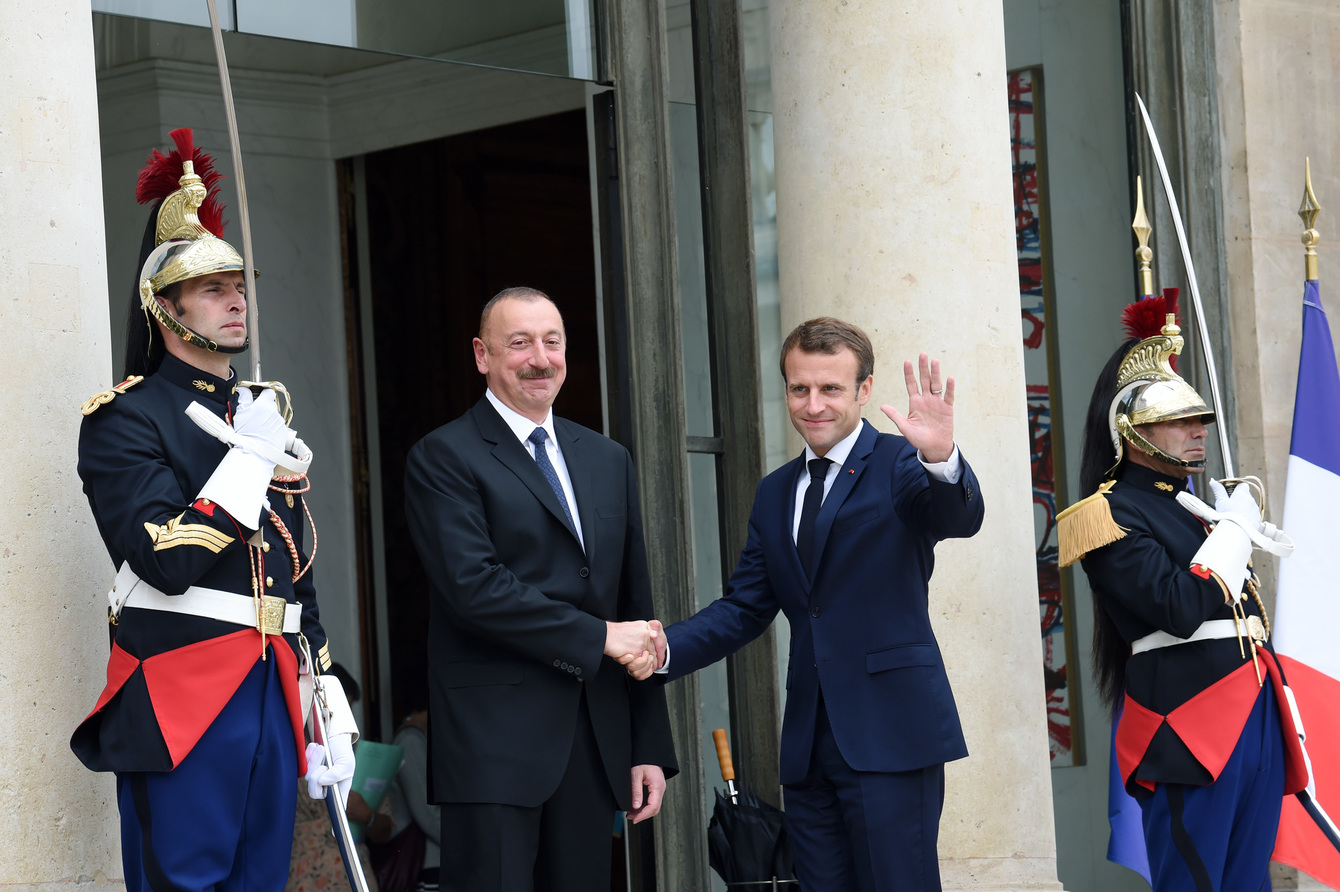
Aliyev with French president Emmanuel Macron

During 12–15 March 2017, Aliyev made an official visit to France and met with executive officials of international companies SUEZ, DCNS, CIFAL, Space Systems in the Airbus Defence and Space Division. during a meeting with French entrepreneurs, he stated that the activities of some companies in the Republic of Artsakh is "unacceptable and violates international and national laws". Following his visit, Aliyev met with the French president in the Elysee Palace. French president François Hollande made a press statement in which he stated that "the status quo in Nagorno-Karabakh conflict is not the right option and he hopes that there can be a resumption of negotiations." During the Second Nagorno-Karabakh War, in which France supported Azerbaijan's adversary Armenia, Aliyev demanded that French president Emmanuel Macron apologize for accusing Azerbaijan of using Syrian mercenaries.

==== Russia ====
On 6 February 2004, Aliyev and Vladimir Putin, the president of Russia, signed the Moscow Declaration, which stated principles of relations between Azerbaijan and Russia. On 16 February 2005 Aliyev participated in the ceremony of opening the Year of Azerbaijan in Russia. On 29 June 2006, Ilham Aliyev and Dmitry Medvedev, former president of the Russian Federation, concluded a joint statement on the Caspian Sea. In 2018, Aliyev and Putin signed Joint Statement on Priority Areas of Economic Cooperation between the two countries. Aliyev met with Russian and Iranian leaders in Baku in 2016 to discuss terrorism, transnational organized crime, arms smuggling and drug trafficking in the region. the trilateral summit signed a declaration to develop the International North–South Transport Corridor, which would run from India to Saint Petersburg, providing better alternatives to existing sea routes.

==== United States ====
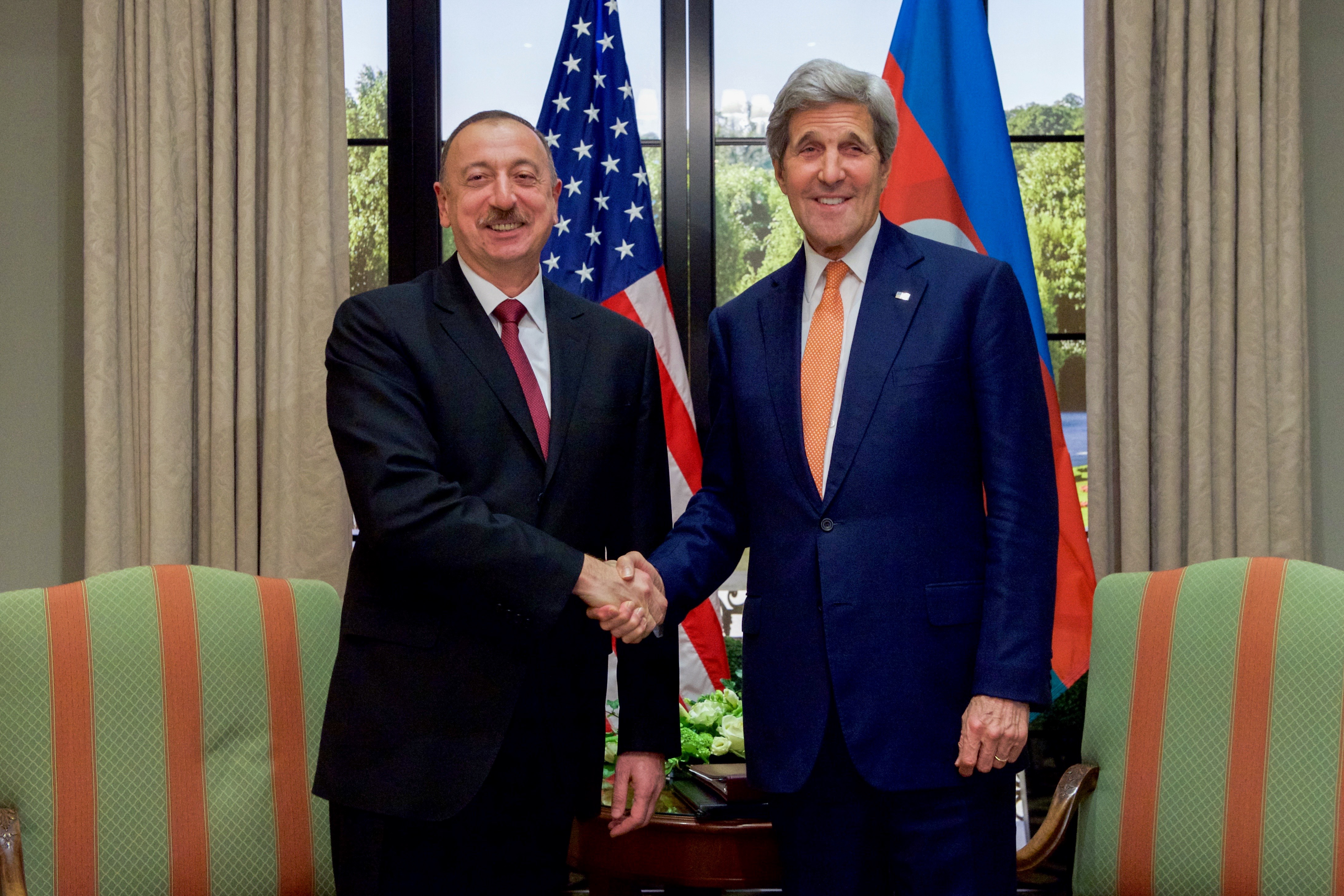
Aliyev with U.S. secretary of state John Kerry in May 2016

Aliyev has met with multiple U.S. presidents during his tenure: George W. Bush, Barack Obama, and Donald Trump.

==== North Atlantic Treaty Organisation (NATO) ====
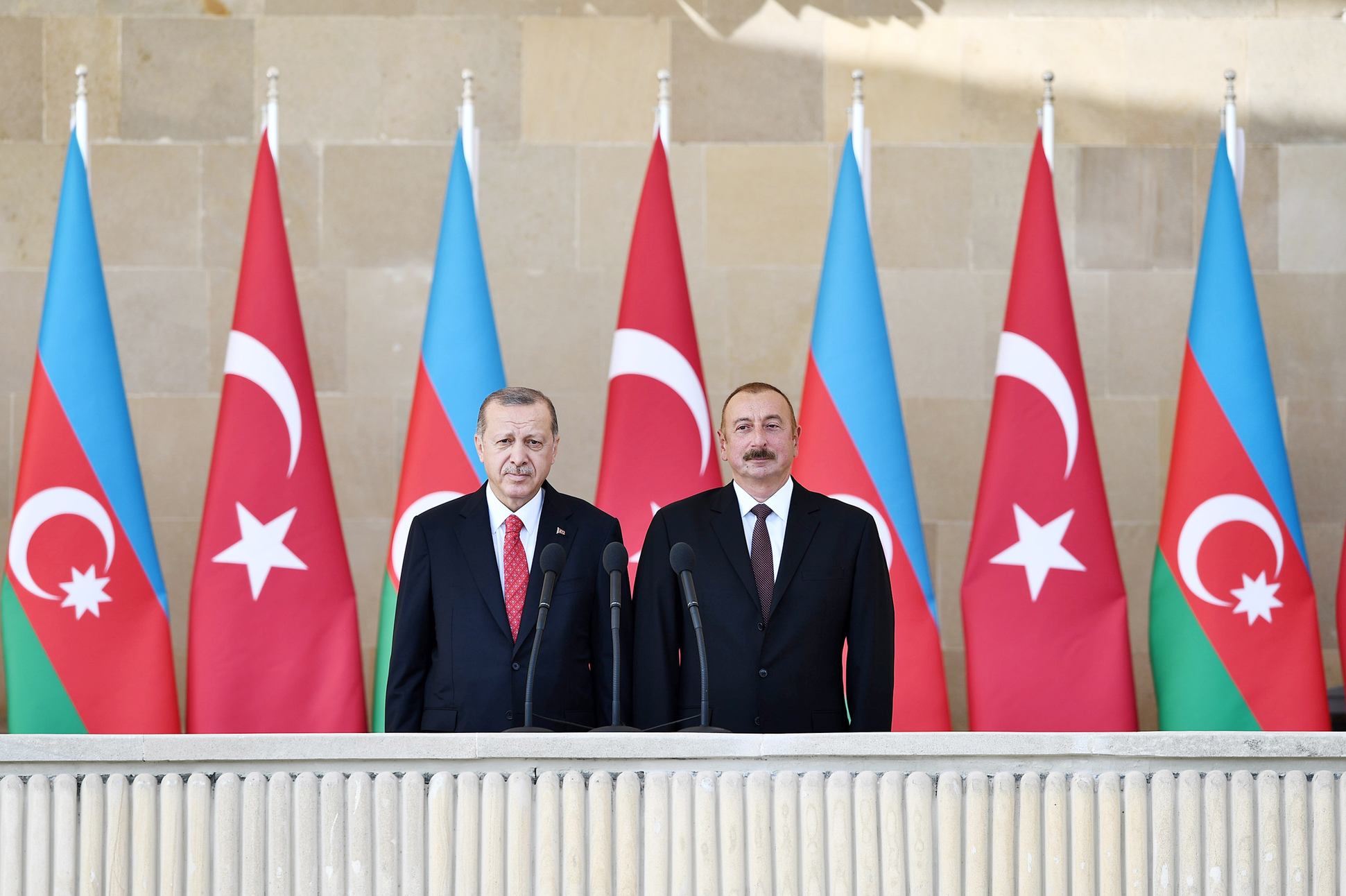
Aliyev with Recep Tayyip Erdoğan. NATO member Turkey is a longtime ally of Azerbaijan.

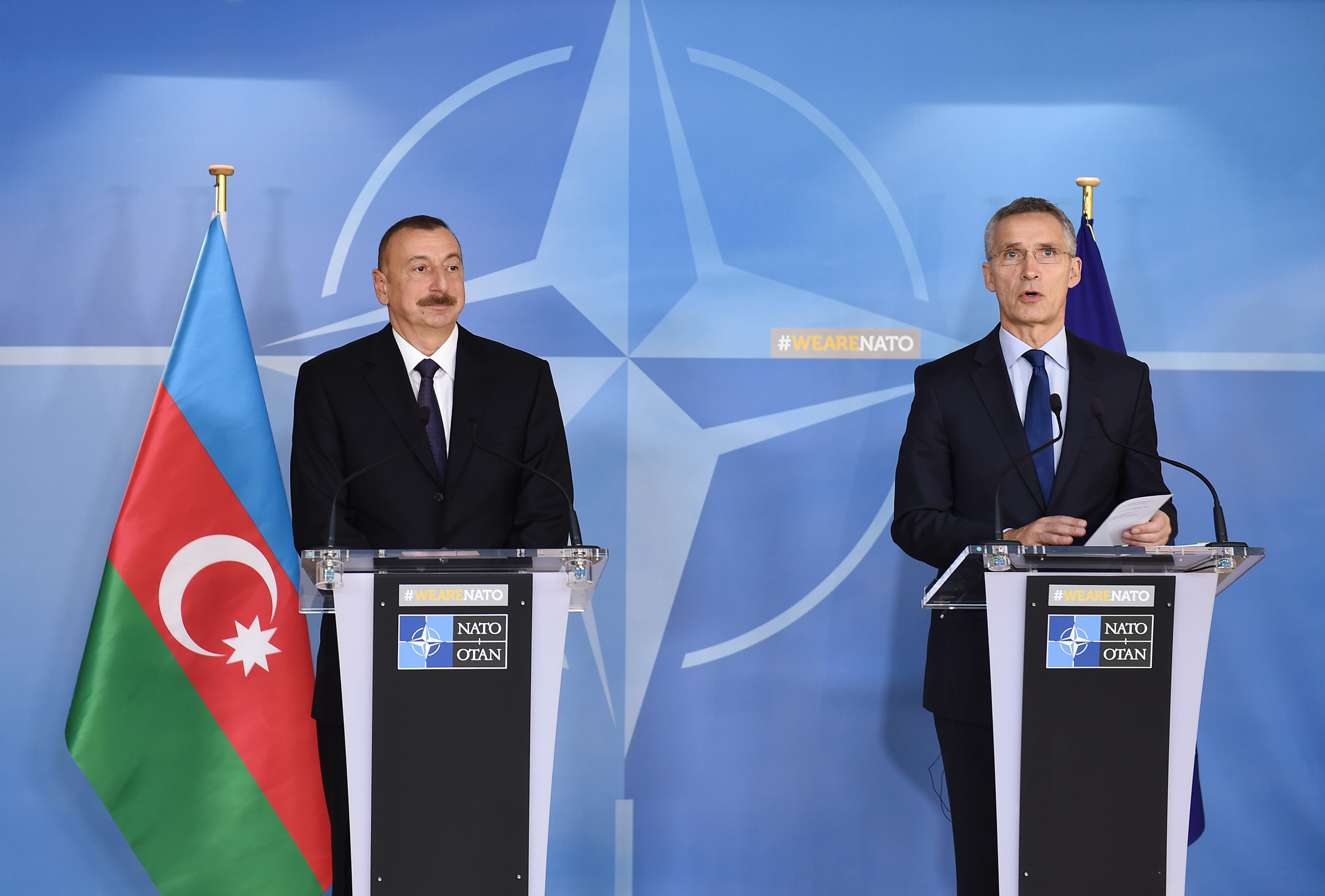
Ilham Aliyev and NATO Secretary General Jens Stoltenberg at a joint press conference in November 2017

During Aliyev's presidency, Azerbaijan joined the Individual Partnership Action Plan. Azerbaijan has completed NATO-Azerbaijan Individual Partnership Action Plan (IPAP) documents for three periods. Ilham Aliyev introduced Azerbaijan's first IPAP to NATO in Brussels on 19 May 2014.

Aliyev has attended several NATO summits and other meetings. Azerbaijan contributed to the NATO-led "Resolute Support" mission in Afghanistan.

=== Domestic policy ===
==== Religious policy ====
On 10 January 2017 Ilham Aliyev announced 2017 as the year of Islamic Solidarity and allocated funds to organize the related events. In 2014 and 2015, Aliyev allocated funds from Presidential Reserve Fund multiple time towards efforts to promote "interreligious dialogue and tolerance" and to restore monuments in Azerbaijan.

==== Corruption ====
Corruption is rampant in Azerbaijan. According to Transparency International, Azerbaijan scores just 30 on the Transparency International Corruption Perceptions Index, indicating a serious problem with corruption. On 8 August 2017, Transparency Azerbaijan announced that it had scaled back its operations in the capital city of Baku, because the government would not approve an extension of the funding as it comes from outside the country. According to Transparency International "The blanket ban on foreign grants has brought the country's civil society to a halt and has dealt a devastating blow to civic initiatives across the board".

==== LGBT rights ====
Discrimination against LGBT people is severe in Azerbaijan. In 2020, ILGA-Europe again declared Azerbaijan the worst country in all of Europe for LGBT rights, with the country receiving a final score of just 2%. Human rights activists have criticized Aliyev's record on LGBT rights.

=== International sporting events ===
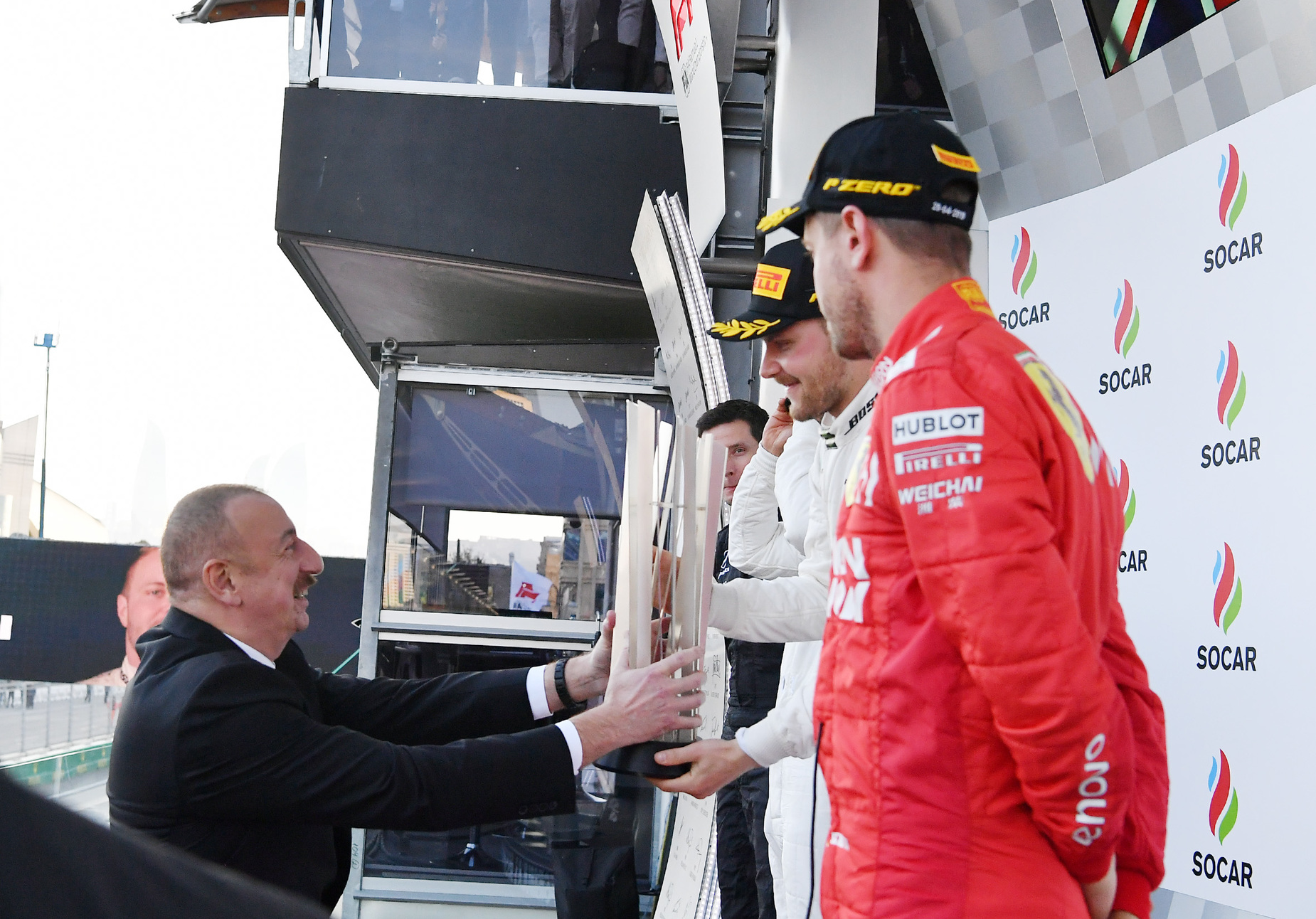
Aliyev awards winners of the 2019 Azerbaijan Grand Prix.

Azerbaijan's oil wealth has made it possible for the country to host lavish international events.

Aliyev is the president of the National Olympic Committee since 1997. During his presidency, Azerbaijan hosted some international sports events such as the 2015 European Games, 4th Islamic Solidarity Games and 42nd Chess Olympiad and the 2016 European Grand Prix. Aliyev attended various opening and award ceremonies where he awarded the winning prizes.

=== Economic policy ===
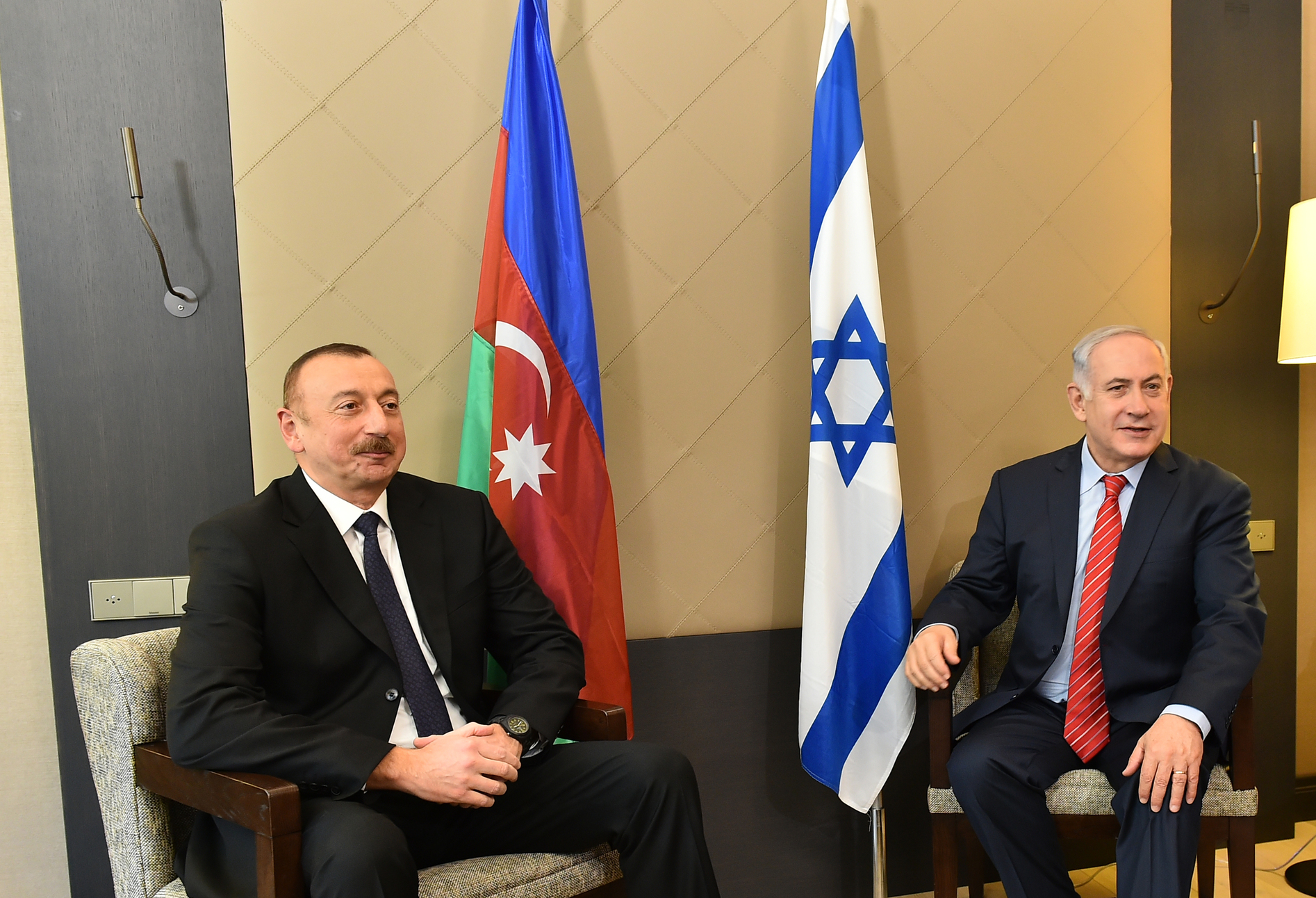
Aliyev with Israeli prime minister Benyamin Netanyahu in Davos, Switzerland. Economic cooperation between Israel and Azerbaijan has been growing significantly.

Upon becoming president in 2003, Aliyev was positioned to enjoy a booming economy fueled by the oil and gas sector; Azerbaijan had the world's fastest rate of economic growth in the three-year period from 2005–2007. Azerbaijan's oil riches strengthened the stability of Aliyev's regime and enriched ruling elites in Azerbaijan. However, periods of low oil prices, as well as inflation, weakened the Azerbaijani economy and slowed economic growth. Aliyev continued the neopatrimonial system inherited from his father. Azerbaijan's oligarchic system inhibited smaller businesses and blocked foreign investment outside the fossil fuels sector. Persistent pledges by Aliyev and Azerbaijani elites to prioritize economic diversification yielded few major results, as the country remained largely depended on oil and gas. The International Monetary Fund has urged Azerbaijan to diversify its economy. Efforts to economically liberalize were inhibited by the authorities' fear of political liberalization. Currency devaluation has been another economic challenge under Aliyev's tenure. In a rare public criticism of other government officials, Aliyev criticized his Economy Minister Shakhin Mustafayev and other Cabinet members for frequently shifting economic forecasts, and for seeking to block economic reforms by blackmailing and denigrating other officials.

== Criticism ==
=== Sunnification efforts ===
The secular government of Azerbaijan officially promoted Turkish-influenced Sufism over both Iranian-influenced Shia Islam and Arab-influenced Salafism, but maintained vigilance over religious activities of any sect. Many Turkish missionaries in Azerbaijan directly worked for the Turkish government religious institutions. There was another rise in conversions to Sunni Islam after the 2020 Nagorno-Karabakh war, which was seen as a symbol of growing closeness with Turkey.

When Azerbaijani Sunnis became a significant minority, many traditional Shia clerics accused Azerbaijani Sunnis of having shamelessly sold their ancestral religion merely for Turkish approval and only symbolically converting without actually believing in it. Many Azerbaijani Shia clerics were pressured into political quietism or pragmatic collaboration with pro-state religious institutions. Many religious Shia Azerbaijanis criticized the rise of Sunni Islam as a betrayal of the historically Shia identity of Azerbaijan and as a means of submission to Turkey after the Ottoman-Safavid conflict which lasted centuries. In 2018, an Azerbaijani Shia cleric stated that they were "trading Karbala for Ankara".

=== Wealth and corruption ===
The Aliyev family have enriched themselves through their ties to state-run businesses. They own significant parts of several major Azerbaijani banks, construction firms and telecommunications firms, as well as partially own the country's oil and gas industries. Much of the wealth is hidden in offshore companies. The 2021 Pandora Papers leaks showed that the Aliyev family built a vast offshore network to hide their money. The family and their close associates have secretly been involved in property deals in the UK worth more than £400 million.

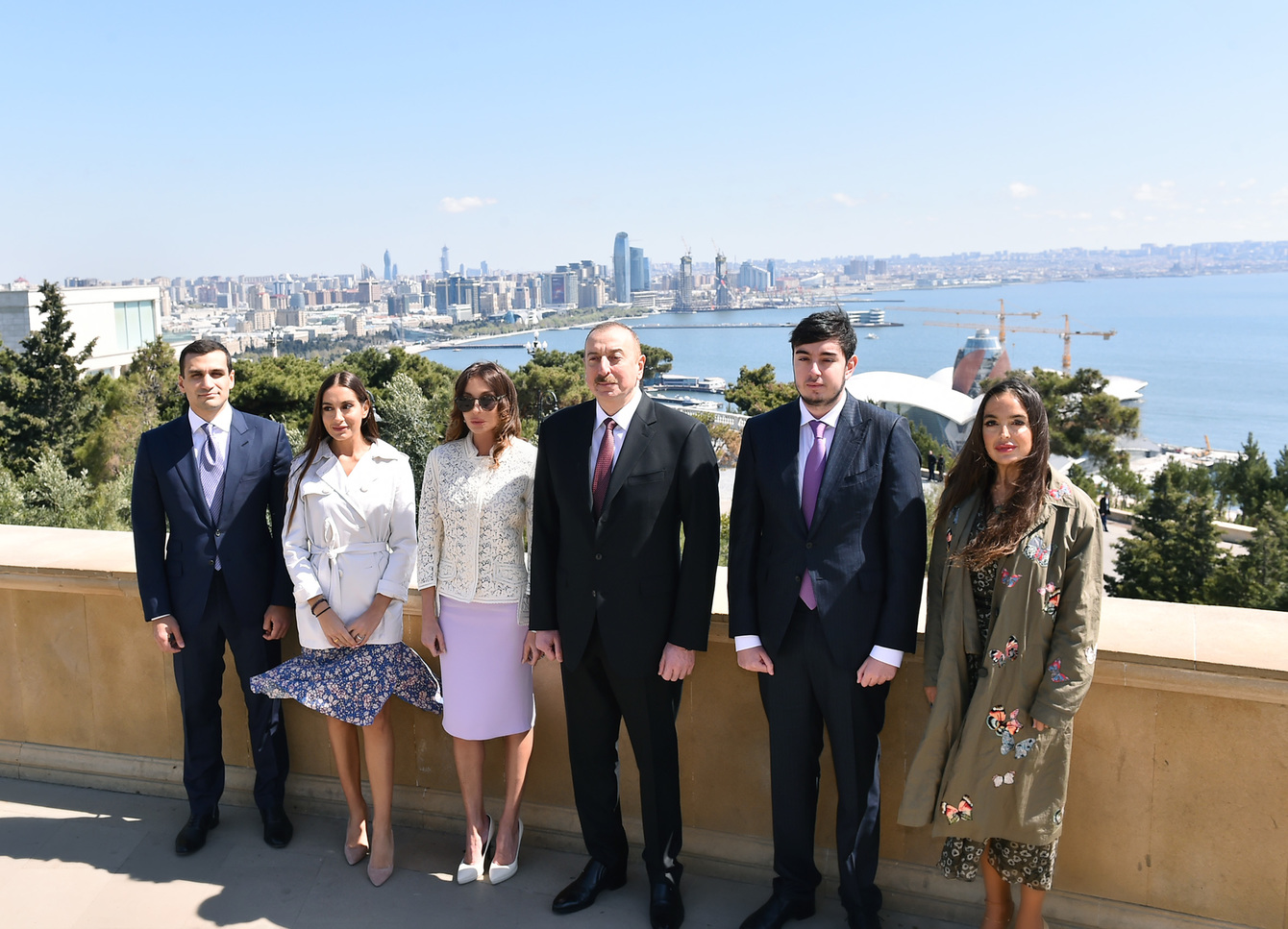
Aliyev family in 2018

Andrew Higgins, writing in The Washington Post, stated in 2010 that Azerbaijanis with the same names as Ilham Aliyev's three children owned real estate in Dubai worth about $75 million. Higgins stated that some members of the family are indeed wealthy, such as the president's older daughter, Leyla, married to Emin Agalarov, a Russian billionaire, and relatives of the first lady who have businesses in Azerbaijan.

In 2012, the Organized Crime and Corruption Reporting Project called Ilham Aliyev the person of the year in organized crime and corruption. Also in 2012, CNBC produced the film Filthy Rich about corruption which also mentioned the Aliyev family.

According to a 2013 investigation by the International Consortium of Investigative Journalists (ICIJ), the Aliyev family owned at least four offshore companies directly connected with Hassan Gozal. ICIJ stated that family members never declared the Aliyevs' offshore companies, that Ilham and Mehriban Aliyevs had no legal right to open offshore companies, and that when these companies were opened, measures were taken to conceal the real owners. When registering the companies, Aliyev's daughters indicated property worth about $6 million. Investigation of Swedish television showed that offshore companies controlled by Aliyevs received from TeliaSonera the Swedish telecommunications company, a factual bribe in the form of shares of Azercell cellular operator in the amount of 600–700 million dollars (due to the estimate of 2005), which was purchased for only 6.5 million dollars. In a resolution on 10 September 2015, the European Parliament called on the EU authorities to conduct a thorough investigation of allegations of corruption against Ilham Aliyev and his family members.

Journalist Khadija Ismayilova, who worked for the United States government-funded Radio Free Europe/Radio Liberty, carried out journalistic investigations, and claimed that Aliyev's family controlled some companies such as "Azerfon", "Azenco", and assets worth $3 billion in the largest Azerbaijani banks.

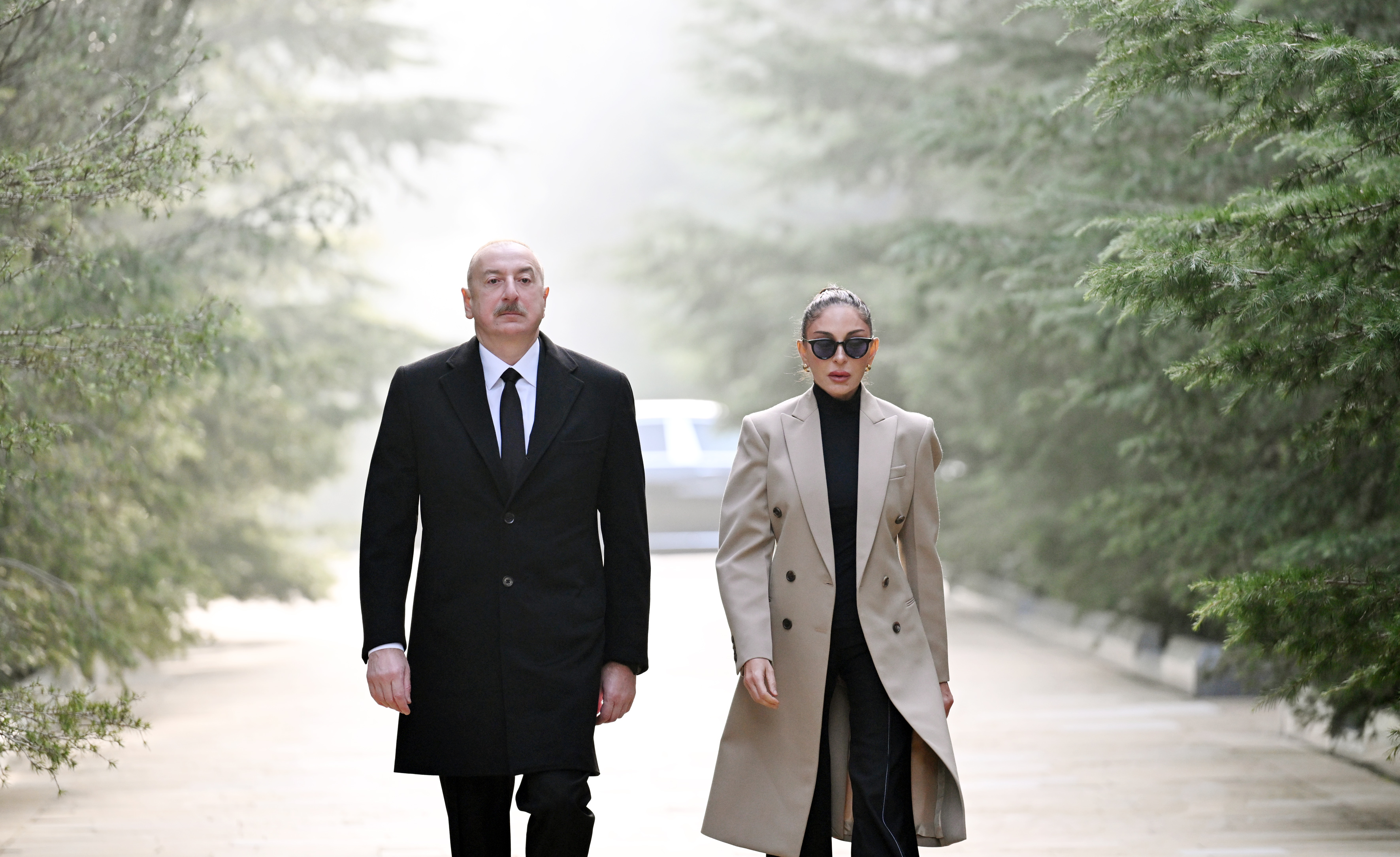
Aliyev and his wife Mehriban Aliyeva were described as the "embodiment of nepotism and kleptocracy" in Azerbaijan.

Ismayilova was later detained in December 2014 and sentenced in September 2015 to 7½ years in prison on trumped-up charges. She was conditionally released in May 2016, in 2020 she was still subject to a travel ban and had been unable to leave the country despite numerous applications to do so. Lawyers will be seeking permission for Ismayilova to travel to the UK to give evidence in the trial of Paul Radu, a Romanian journalist who is co-founder and executive director of investigative reporting group OCCRP (the Organized Crime and Corruption Reporting Project). Radu is being sued for defamation in London by Azerbaijani MP, Javanshir Feyziyev, over two articles in OCCRP's award-winning Azerbaijan Laundromat series about money-laundering out of Azerbaijan. Ismayilova, OCCRP's lead reporter in Azerbaijan, is a key witness in the case.

Aliyev was also included on a list of figures (others being the Minister of Emergency Situations Kamaladdin Heydarov, head of the Presidential Administration Ramiz Mehdiyev and First Lady Mehriban Aliyeva) accused of accepting bribes of $1,000,000 USD from MP candidates to guarantee their "election win" and inclusion to the parliament. This high-level corruption scandal is widely called the Gulargate. In US diplomatic channels, Aliyev's tactics has even been likened to those who head criminal organizations.

=== Lobbying and money laundering ===
Azerbaijan's oil wealth has made it possible for the regime to engage in extensive lobbying efforts. In 2017, the Aliyev family was implicated in the Azerbaijani laundromat scandal, which was a complex money-laundering scheme to pay off prominent European politicians to deflect criticism of Aliyev and promote a positive image of his regime. Much of Aliyev's and his families wealth is hidden through an elaborate network of offshore companies.

=== Authoritarianism ===
Aliyev rules an authoritarian regime in Azerbaijan, as elections are not free and fair, power is concentrated in the hands of Aliyev and his extended family, corruption is rampant, and human rights violations are severe (which included torture, arbitrary arrests, as well as harassment of journalists and non-governmental organizations). Many observers see Aliyev as a dictator.

==== Human rights violations ====
Human rights violations in Azerbaijan during Aliyev's presidency include torture, arbitrary arrests and harassment of journalists and non-governmental organizations.

==== Suppression of opposition parties and free press ====
In a speech delivered on 15 July 2020, during the 2020 Armenian–Azerbaijani clashes, President Aliyev targeted the largest opposition party, the Popular Front Party of Azerbaijan. He declared that "we need to finish with the 'fifth column" and the Popular Front "worse than the Armenians". According to Azerbaijani sources as many as 120 people are currently held in jail, including some deputy leaders of the party as well as journalists. On 20 July the U.S. State Department urged Azerbaijan to avoid using the pandemic to silence "civil society advocacy, opposition voices, or public discussion". These actions are widely seen as an attempt "to eliminate pro-democracy advocates and political rivals once and for all". According to RFE/RL, "Aliyev's authoritarian rule has shut down independent media outlets and suppressed opposition parties while holding elections deemed neither free nor fair by international monitoring groups".

According to Reporters Without Borders, Aliyev launched "a new wave of fierce repression against the country’s last remaining journalists" in late 2023. Journalists from the independent Abzas Media, Toplum TV, and Meydan TV were prosecuted in 2024 and 2025 in trials that international human rights organizations described as unfair. The long prison sentences for seven journalists from Abzas Media are widely seen as retaliation for the outlet's investigations into corruption in the family of Ilham Aliyev and his inner circle.

== Controversies ==
=== Ramil Safarov repatriation ===
In 2012, Aliyev convinced the government of Hungary to transfer convicted murderer Ramil Safarov to Azerbaijan to complete the rest of his prison term. While attending a NATO-sponsored English-language course in Hungary, Safarov had murdered an Armenian lieutenant, Gurgen Margaryan, who was also taking the course, while Margaryan was asleep. Safarov admitted that he committed the crime and surrendered himself to the police. Safarov has justified the act based over the Naghorno Karabakh conflict between the two countries from 1988 to 1994. Safarov had been tried and sentenced to life imprisonment in Hungary. However, after being extradited to Azerbaijan, Safarov received a hero's welcome, promoted to the rank of major, and given an apartment and over eight years of back pay, covering the time he had spent in jail.

=== Statements about conflict with Armenians ===
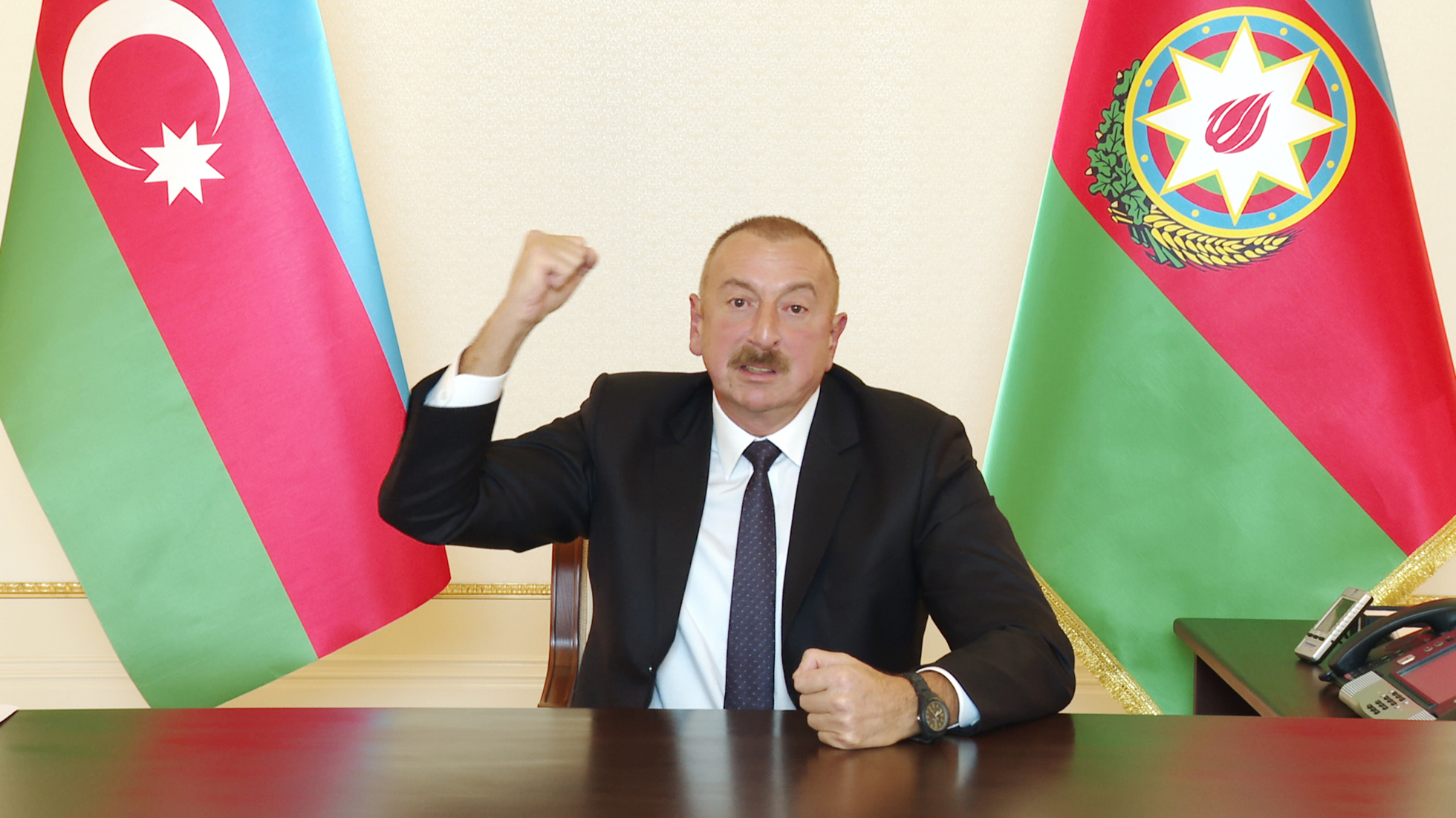
Aliyev in a speech on 4 October 2020, during the Second Nagorno-Karabakh War between Armenia, Artsakh and Azerbaijan

While in office, Aliyev has made numerous anti-Armenian statements, and claiming historically Armenian territory for Azerbaijan. Shortly after thousands of Azerbaijani people gathered to commemorate the Khojaly massacre, in which Azerbaijan claims that 613 Azerbaijanis had been massacred by the Armenian irregular forces and the 366th CIS regiment of the Soviet Union 20 years earlier, Human Rights Watch claims that 200+ Azerbaijanis were massacred, Aliyev posted on his official website: "Our main enemies are Armenians of the world and the hypocritical and corrupt politicians that they control". During his speech, Ilham Aliyev noted: "I once said that the Armenian people should not be afraid of us, they should be afraid of their own leadership".

In 2008, Aliyev declared that "Nagorno Karabakh will not be independent; the position is backed by international mediators as well; Armenia has to accept the reality", and also stated that "in 1918, Yerevan was granted to the Armenians. It was a great mistake. The khanate of Iravan was the Azerbaijani territory, the Armenians were guests there." President Ilham Aliyev stated, "the occupation of the territory of the sovereign State with its internationally recognized boundaries – our territorial integrity is recognized by the United Nation and has been left out of due attention of the international community. All these facts are the ever seen injustice." "No project can be carried out in the Armenian occupied Azerbaijani territories without the consent and participation of Azerbaijan".

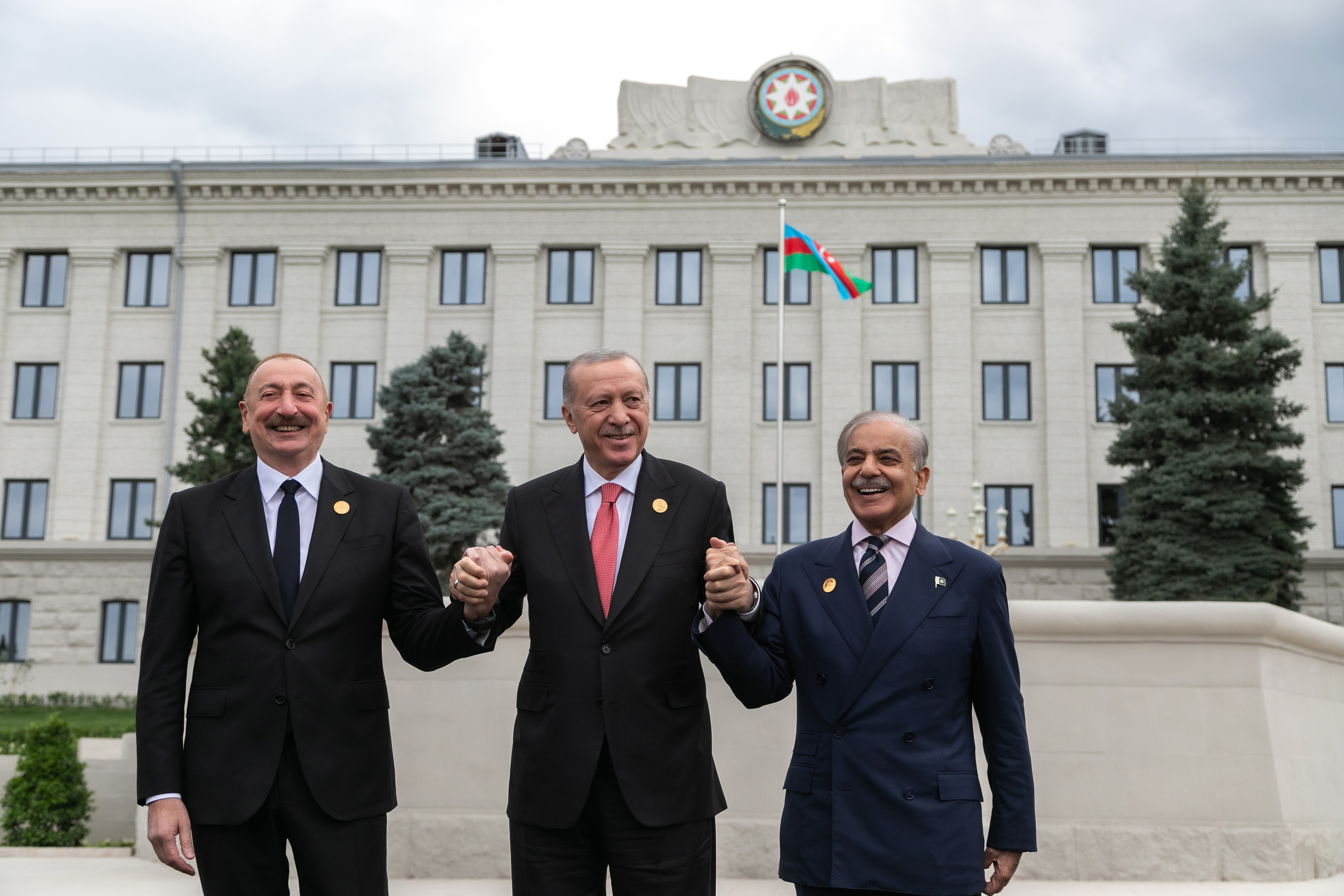
Aliyev, Turkish President Recep Tayyip Erdoğan and Pakistani Prime Minister Shehbaz Sharif in Stepanakert, Nagorno-Karabakh, July 2025

Aliyev said that "Armenians living in Karabakh must either accept Azerbaijani citizenship or look for another place to live" adding that "I am sure that the majority of the Armenian population living in Karabakh today is ready to accept Azerbaijani citizenship. It's just that these leeches, these wild animals, the separatists [referring to the de facto Republic of Artsakh representatives] don't allow it." Aliyev's irredentist statements have drawn criticism from EU officials and human rights organizations specializing in genocide studies.

During a speech on 10 November 2020, Aliyev directly referred to Prime Minister of Armenia Nikol Pashinyan by mockingly saying Nə oldu Paşinyan? ("What happened Pashinyan?"), which became an Internet meme in Azerbaijan and Turkey. In 2023, experts in genocide prevention stated that Azerbaijan's blockade of Nagorno-Karabakh and sabotage of public infrastructure constitutes genocide according to the Genocide Convention: "Deliberately inflicting on the group conditions of life calculated to bring about its physical destruction" and that there are various indicators that Azerbaijan possesses genocidal intent: President Aliyev's public statements, his regime's openly Armenophobic practices and noncompliance with the International Court of Justice orders to end the blockade.

==== Denying Armenia's right to exist ====
Aliyev has repeatedly made substantial territorial claims over Armenia proper. In 2012 he stated that "Armenia as a country is of no value. It is actually a colony, an outpost run from abroad, a territory artificially created on ancient Azerbaijani lands." In 2013 he defined much of Armenia as "historical lands" of the Azerbaijanis, promising them that they will live there "in the future", including in "Irevan and Zangezur regions", to which he sometimes adds "Geicha", Meghri, and Goris. The first three of these are irredentist terms by which he means the Armenian capital Yerevan, the southern Syunik Province, and Lake Sevan in Gegharkunik Province, all of them in Armenia, while the latter two are towns in Syunik Province. In 2018, when he became the New Azerbaijan Party's presidential candidate, he repeated his call for "the return of Azerbaijanis to these lands" and declared this to be "our political and strategic goal, and we must gradually approach it." In December 2016, he clarified that he does not "intend to reclaim [these lands] ... through military force" in the immediate future, but that the "time will come" when "we, Azerbaijanis, will return to all our historic lands", wherefore "[t]he main factor [for success] is strength... a more powerful army."

== Personal life ==
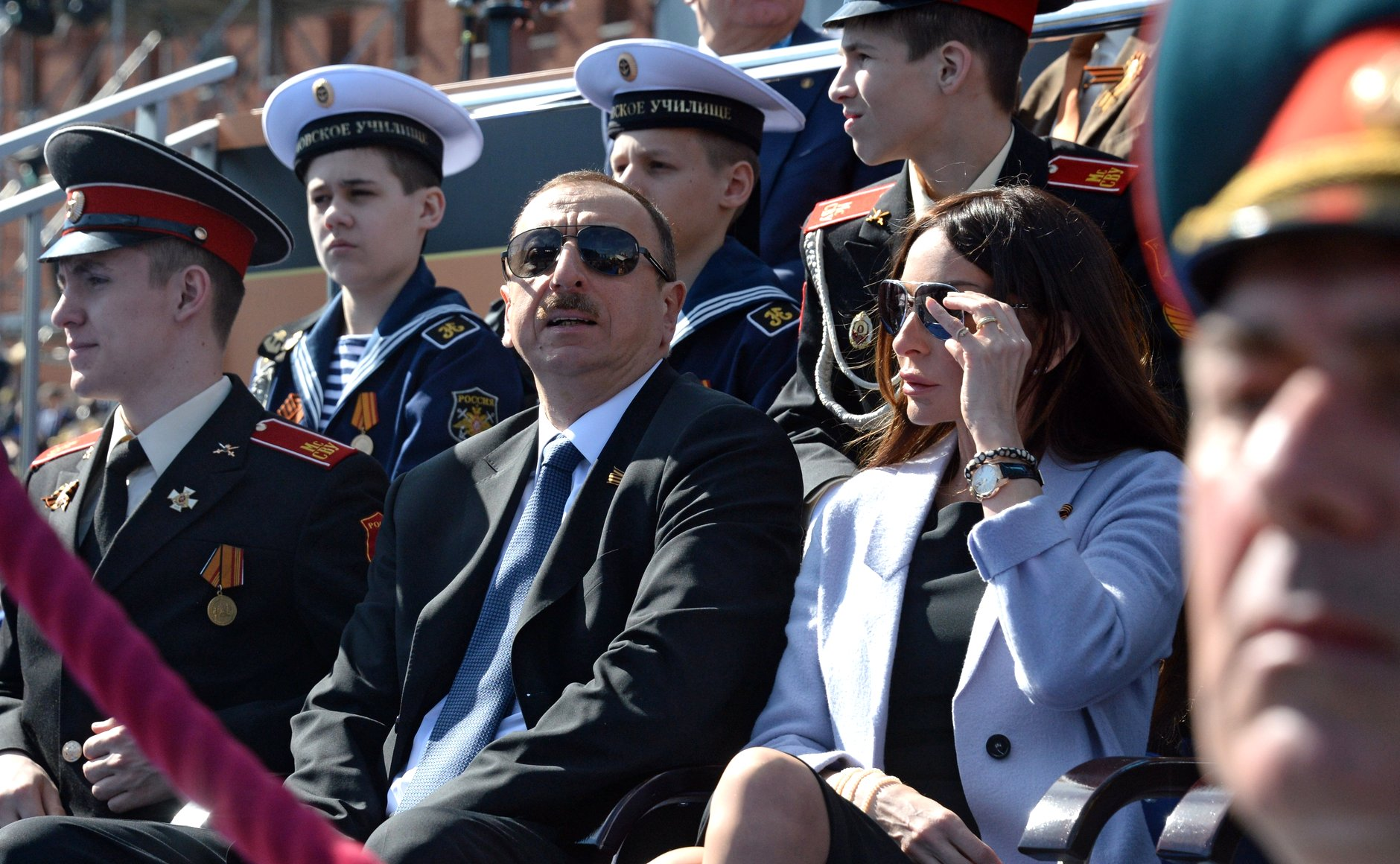
Ilham Aliyev with the first lady during the Moscow Victory Day Parade, 9 May 2015

Ilham Aliyev married Mehriban Aliyeva in Baku on 22 January 1983. They have three children, Leyla, Arzu and Heydar, and five grandchildren. He is fluent in Azerbaijani, English, French, Russian and Turkish. His wife is the inaugural Vice President of Azerbaijan.

== Honours ==
=== National honours and medals ===
- Azerbaijan – Heydar Aliyev Order
- Azerbaijan – Order of Sheikhulislam

=== Foreign honours ===
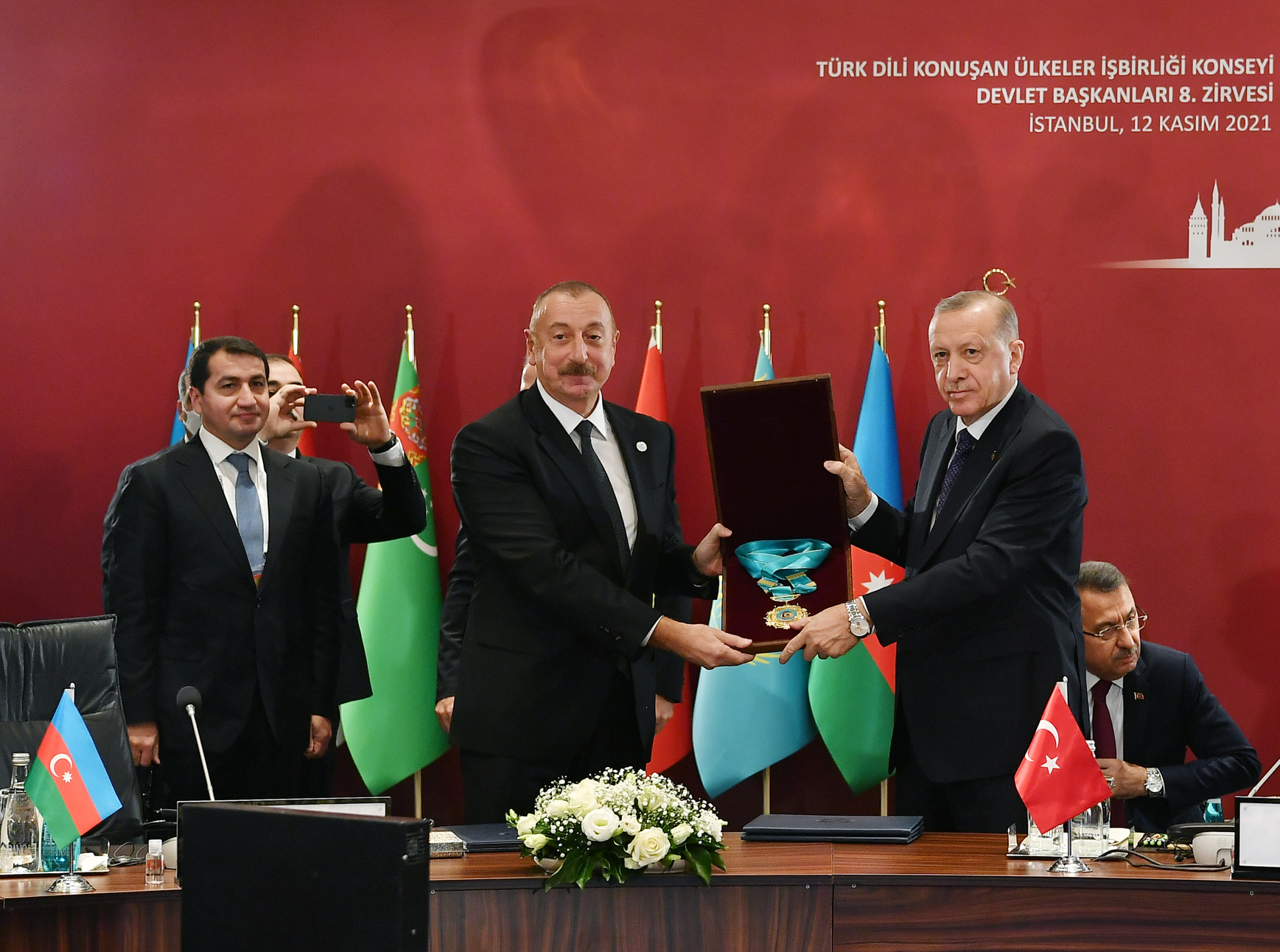
Ilham Aliyev receiving the Supreme Order of the Turkic World during the 8th summit of the Organization of Turkic States

- Romania – Order of the Star of Romania (2004)
- Saudi Arabia – Order of Abdulaziz Al Saud (2005)
- Georgia – Order of Honor of Georgia
- Bulgaria - Order of Stara Planina
- France – Grand Cross of the Legion of Honor
- Poland – Order of Merit of the Republic of Poland
- Ukraine – First Class of the Order of Prince Yaroslav the Wise (2008)
- Kuwait – Order of Mubarak the Great
- Greece – Gold Medal of the Hellenic Republic
- Latvia – Knight Grand Cross of the Order of the Three Stars
- Romania – Grand Cross of Faithful Service
- Tajikistan – Order of Ismoili Somoni
- Turkey – First Class of the Order of the State of Republic of Turkey (2013)
- Ukraine – Order of Liberty (2013)
- Serbia – Order of the Republic of Serbia (2013)
- Italy – Knight Grand Cross with Collar of the Order of Merit of the Italian Republic (12 July 2018)
- Bulgaria – Friendship order of Bulgaria (2019)
- Kazakhstan – Order of the Golden Eagle (22 August 2022)
- Uzbekistan – Order of Highest Friendship (23 August 2026)

=== International organizations ===
- CIS Medal For Distinction in Protection of CIS State Borders and Badge for Strengthening of Border Cooperation (2008).
- Organization of Turkic States – Supreme Order of Turkic World

Others

- Turkey – İhsan Doğramacı Prize for International Relations for Peace
- Russia – Prepodobniy Sergiy Rodonejskiy first degree Order of Russian Orthodox Church
- International Military Sports Council – Grand Cordon Order of Merit

=== Honorary degrees ===
Aliyev has also received honorary degrees from universities from the following states: Turkmenistan, Belarus, Russia, Bulgaria, Turkey, Ukraine, Kazakhstan, Romania, Jordan, Hungary, Azerbaijan, and South Korea.

== In popular culture ==
The last frame of the movie Borat shows the image of Ilham Aliyev superimposed over a Kazakh flag.

== See also ==
- List of current heads of state and government
- List of heads of the executive by approval rating
