= Etibar Mammadov =

Azerbaijani politician (born 1955)

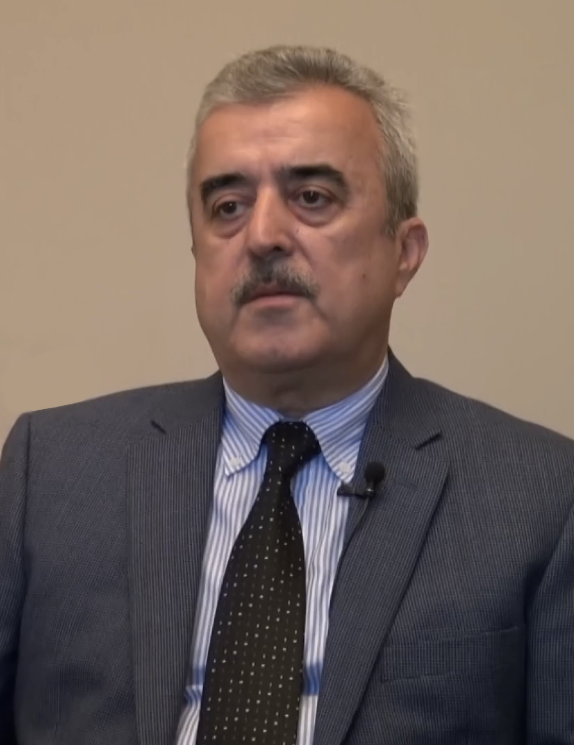
Etibar Mammadov in 2017

Etibar Salidar oglu Mammadov (Azerbaijani: Etibar Səlidar oğlu Məmmədov; born 2 April 1955 in Baku) is an Azerbaijani politician and the founder of the Azerbaijan National Independence Party (NIPA). First rising to prominence as an anti-communist during the Soviet era, he became one of Azerbaijan's most prominent politicians in the 1990s.

He graduated from Baku State University in the Department of U.S. History in 1972, and later on defended his dissertation on Russian tsarism and the Muslim elite during the 19th century in 1985. He joined the political movement in 1988, but was arrested in January 1990 and taken to Lefortovo Prison for nine months.

Mammadov, who served in the National Assembly of Azerbaijan from 1991 until 2000, founded the NIPA in 1992. NIPA splintered from the Popular Front after its June 1991 annual conference, calling for a more hardline and militaristic policy on independence and with the conflict with Armenia. He registered as a candidate soon after in the 1992 presidential elections, but bowed out after claiming elections should not be held during wartime. He ran for president of Azerbaijan in 1998 and 2003; in 1998, he placed second with 11.6% of the vote, while in 2003, he placed fourth with 2.92%. Mammadov led the NIPA until his resignation on 24 December 2004 following a series of poor performances by the party in recent elections.

At some point, Mammadov was also the vice-chairman of International Democrat Union.

== Personal life ==
He has a son, Ayhan Etibaroglu, who was elected chairman of the youth organization of NIPA in 2013.
