= Azerbaijan National Independence Party =

National Independence Party Azərbaycan Milli İstiqlal Partiyası
- Abbreviation: AMİP
- Party leader: Etibar Mammadov
- President: Arzukhan Alizade
- Founded: July 1992
- Headquarters: Baku
- Ideology: Liberal conservatism
- Political position: Centre-right
- International affiliation: International Democracy Union

Website
- amip.az (archived 3 July 2013)

The National Independence Party of Azerbaijan (Azerbaijani: Azərbaycan Milli İstiqlal Partiyası) is a centre-right political party in Azerbaijan.

== History ==
NIPA was founded on July 3–4, 1992 and was officially registered at the Justice Ministry on July 17 the same year, reestablishing multi-party system in Azerbaijan after 70 years of Soviet rule.

NIPA was the first political organization to struggle for political power and its party leader Etibar Mammadov was one of the leading figures of the Azerbaijani national freedom movement.

While holding a press conference in Moscow City on January 26, 1990, on the massacres committed by the Soviet Union in Baku January 20, 1990, Etibar Mammadov was arrested and detained in the Lefortovo prison.

NIPA has taken part in all elections held in the country since independence. In the 1992 presidential election, Etibar Mammadov took back his candidacy, but three years later, NIPA cleared the 8% barrier in 1995 parliamentary elections and thereby got represented in the supreme legislative body, despite all the obstacles set up by the more and more undemocratic government.

In the presidential election of 1998, Etibar Mammadov came second. NIPA did also participate in 2000, 2005 and 2010 parliamentary elections.

In 2003, Etibar Mammadov participated at the elections as the candidate of the election bloq “Qelebe” (victory), established within NIPA October 15, 2003. The results of elections were falsified.

NIPA which joined 2004 municipal elections occupied the second place after New Azerbaijan Party, the ruling party, for number of municipal members.

== Ideology and political positions ==
The main purpose of the party is to combine the principles of Azerbaijanism and modernization in thought; conservatism in tradition and morality; liberty in economy; justice in social life, as well as achieving unity and integrity of the society and state.

The party struggles for building democracy and establishing rule of law in the country, something that has exposed its supporters to various forms of punishments from the current regime.

== Organization ==
NIPA is one of the leading political parties in Azeri politics, playing an important role in public and social life, with local branches in 73 regions and more than 40 000 members.

== International networks ==
The party has a well-developed international network, as a member of the International Democracy Union (IDU), a working association of over 82 centre-right parties from over 63 countries. In 1996 NIPA became associative member of the union and is a full member since May, 1999. The leader of the party, Etibar Mammadov is one of the vice-chairmen of IDU.

== Leaders ==
Senior Officials of the party:

- Party Leader: Mammadov Etibar Salidar oglu
- Secretary General: Arzukhan Alizada
- Chairman of Central Council: Aydın Aliyev
- Secretary on Organizational Issues: Nazim Aleskerov
- Secretary on International Relations: Elshan Mustafayev
- Secretary on Financial Issues: Vagif Mammadov
- Deputy Chairman of NIPA Central Council: Nigar Alijanova
- Chairman of Central Disciplinary Commission: Maarif Abbasov
- Chairman of Youth Organization: Aykhan Etibaroghlu
- Chairman of Women Organization: Amina Veliyeva

== Election results ==
=== Presidential elections ===
| Election | Party candidate | Votes | % | Result |
|---|---|---|---|---|
| 1998 | Etibar Mammadov | 389,662 | 11.83% | Lost ✗ |
| 2003 | Etibar Mammadov | 70,638 | 2.92% | Lost ✗ |

=== National Assembly elections ===
| Election | Leader | Votes | % | Seats | +/– | Position | Government |
|---|---|---|---|---|---|---|---|
| 1995–1996 | Etibar Mammadov | 331,865 | 9.30 | 4 / 125 | New | ▲3rd | Opposition |
| 2000–2001 | Etibar Mammadov | | 3.9 | 2 / 125 | ▼2 | ▼6th | Opposition |
| 2005 | Did not contest | | | 0 / 125 | ▼2 | —N/a | Extra-parliamentary |
| 2010 | Etibar Mammadov | 23,141 | 0.97 | 0 / 125 | 0 | ▲8th | Extra-parliamentary |
| 2015 | Etibar Mammadov | 10,526 | 0.37 | 0 / 125 | 0 | ▼17th | Extra-parliamentary |
| 2020 | Etibar Mammadov | 6,688 | 0.29 | 0 / 125 | 0 | ▲12th | Extra-parliamentary |
| 2024 | Etibar Mammadov | 13,961 | 0.59 | 1 / 125 | ▲1 | ▲8th | Support |
