= 2016 Azerbaijani protests =

The 2016 Azerbaijan Protests - Protests against price increases, unemployment and the social situation in Azerbaijan since January 12, 2016. On January 12, 2016, protests were held in Lankaran, Fizuli and Siyazan in connection with the social situation. Residents of Lankaran's Liman settlement closed the Alat-Astara road. Residents protested against rising prices and unemployment. According to RFE / RL, police were called in to prevent the protest. In Siyazan, residents gathered in front of the district executive power to protest against the rise in prices. Residents said it was impossible to live in the current conditions.

Another protest was held in Agjabadi. Residents protested against the rise in prices. In addition, three Agjabadi residents reportedly attempted to commit suicide by climbing on top of the building. Rising prices and unemployment have also reportedly sparked protests in the village of Hindarkh. According to the BBC, about 200 residents gathered at noon and closed the Agdash-Barda road. The meeting was held at the stadium in the village.

Residents of Bala Bahmanli village of Fuzuli region also protested against the rise in prices. Bagir Aslanov, the first deputy head of the Fuzuli District Executive Power, confirmed that the price increase was the reason for the protest in Fuzuli. A day after protests against rising food prices in Azerbaijan, the government has reduced value added tax on imports and sales of wheat, production and sale of wheat flour and bread.

== See also ==
- 2003 Azerbaijani protests
- 2011 Azerbaijani protests
