= National Unity (Azerbaijan) =

The National Unity (Azerbaijani: Milli Birlik) is a political movement in Azerbaijan. Its candidate Lala Shevket won 3.3% of the popular vote in the 15 October 2003 presidential elections according to the official results of the Central Election Commission.
