= 2003 Azerbaijani presidential election =

- 15 October 2003
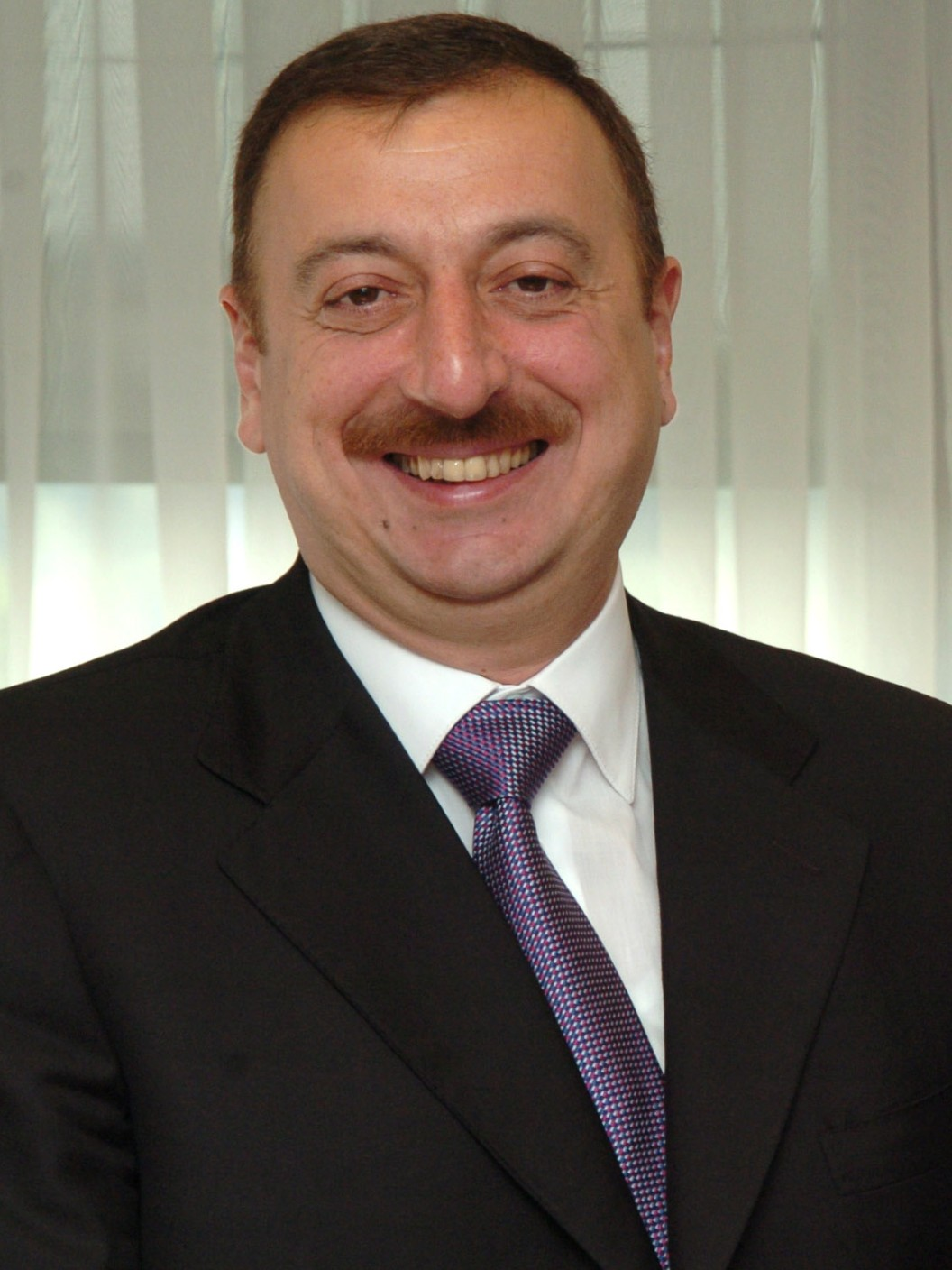

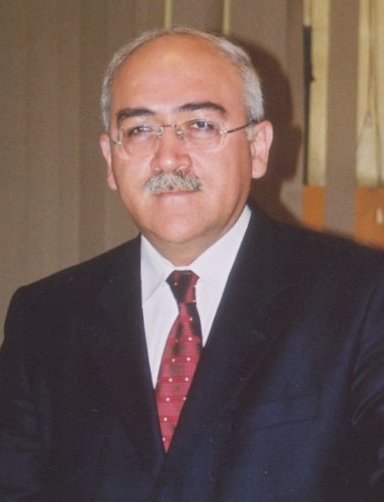
Nominee	Ilham Aliyev	Isa Gambar
Party	New Azerbaijan	Musavat
Popular vote	1,860,346	338,145
Percentage	76.84%	13.97%
President before election
Heydar Aliyev
New Azerbaijan
Elected President
Ilham Aliyev
New Azerbaijan

Presidential elections were held in Azerbaijan on 15 October 2003. As expected, Ilham Aliyev, son of the outgoing president, Heydar Aliyev, was officially elected with an overwhelming majority in a vote international observers deemed not to be free or fair.

The election was characterized by ballot stuffing and manipulated voter lists. The final vote tabulation was kept from OSCE/ODIHR monitors, which meant that they could not judge the accuracy of the results. Police arrested members of electoral commissions who refused to sign paperwork on vote counts from their precincts. The opposition claimed that Isa Gambar had won the election. The opposition protested against the election results, with the Aliyev regime arresting hundreds, including Gambar.

== Conduct ==
Human Rights Watch stated that the "election campaign... from the beginning was heavily manipulated by the government to favor Prime Minister Ilham Aliyev, son of President Heydar Aliyev. The government ensured that election commissions would be stacked to favor Aliyev, and banned nongovernmental organizations (NGOs) from monitoring the vote. As the election drew nearer, government officials openly sided with Ilham Aliyev, obstructed opposition rallies, and sought to limit participation in them. Police have beaten and arbitrarily detained hundreds of opposition activists, including a 73-year-old woman."

The Institute for Democracy in Eastern Europe provided 188 election observers. The mission, requested by the United States government, formed part of a larger group of observers monitoring under the auspices of the OSCE. The IDEE observers observed more than 1,000 voting precincts and Constituency Election Centers where votes were tabulated, and collectively issued a "Votum Separatum," which expressed their outrage at election fraud, intimidation and political repression they witnessed during their observation mission and their disagreement with the OSCE's mild preliminary report calling the elections "generally well administered."

== Results ==
Candidate	Party	Votes	%
Ilham Aliyev	New Azerbaijan Party	1,860,346	76.84
Isa Gambar	Musavat	338,145	13.97
Lala Shevket	National Unity	87,523	3.62
Etibar Mammadov	Azerbaijan National Independence Party	70,638	2.92
Ilyas Ismayilov	Justice Party	24,098	1.00
Sabir Rustamkhanli	Civic Solidarity Party	19,973	0.82
Gudrat Gasanguliev	Azerbaijani Popular Front Party	12,071	0.50
Hafiz Hajiyev	Modern Musavat Party	8,267	0.34
Total		2,421,061	100.00
Source: Constitutional Court
