= 1998 Azerbaijani presidential election =

- 11 October 1998
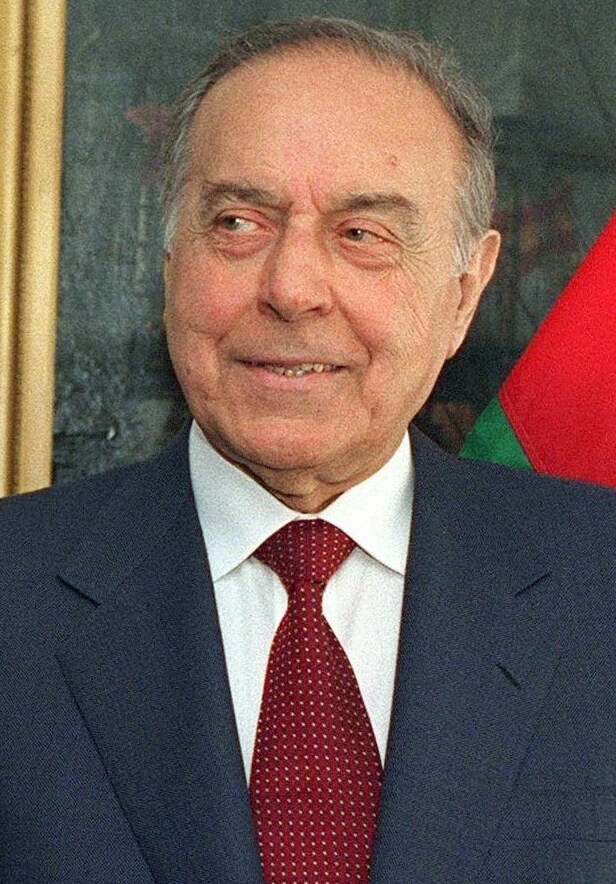

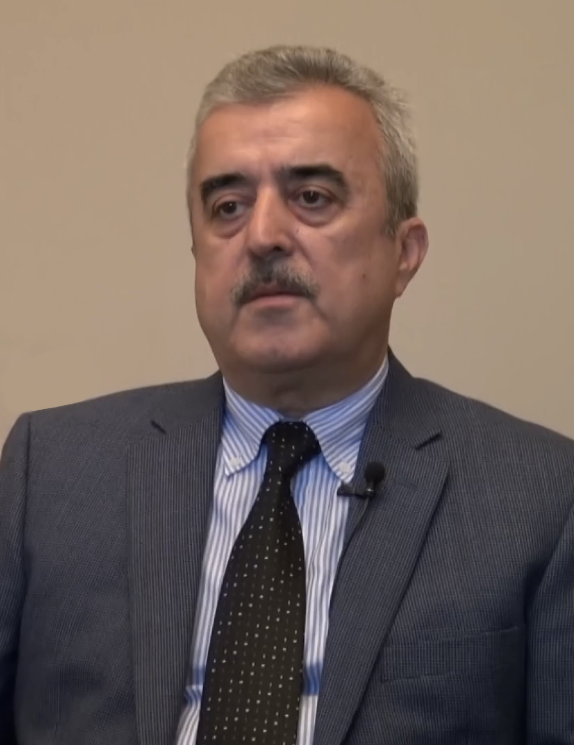
Nominee	Heydar Aliyev	Etibar Mammadov
Party	New Azerbaijan	AMİP
Popular vote	2,556,059	389,662
Percentage	77.61%	11.83%
President before election
Heydar Aliyev
New Azerbaijan
Elected President
Heydar Aliyev
New Azerbaijan

Presidential elections were held in Azerbaijan on 11 October 1998. The result was a victory for Heydar Aliyev of the New Azerbaijan Party, who received 78% of the vote. Voter turnout was reported to be 79%.

The election occurred under the context in which Heydar Aliyev had cemented "complete political control" of Azerbaijan, as his party controlled the legislature and the state dominated the media. The main opposition parties in Azerbaijan boycotted the election with the exception of Etibar Mammadov. Election monitors noted ballot stuffing and allegations of fabricated vote counts. After the election, Mammadov challenged the election before Azerbaijan's Supreme Court, which rejected his appeal.

An independent assessment of the vote put the outcome at 50-60% for Aliyev and 25% for Mammadov.

== Results ==
Candidate	Party	Votes	%
Heydar Aliyev	New Azerbaijan Party	2,556,059	77.61
Etibar Mammadov	Azerbaijan National Independence Party	389,662	11.83
Nizami Süleymanov	Independent Azerbaijan Party	270,709	8.22
Firudin Hasanov	Azerbaijan Communist Party	29,244	0.89
Ashraf Mehdiyev	Endeavour Party	28,809	0.87
Khanhuseyn Kazimli	Azerbaijan Social Prosperity Party	8,254	0.25
Against all		10,910	0.33
Total		3,293,647	100.00
Valid votes		3,293,647	98.07
Invalid/blank votes		64,818	1.93
Total votes		3,358,465	100.00
Registered voters/turnout		4,255,717	78.92
Source: Nohlen et al.
