= Sumgait Boulevard =

Promenade in Sumgait, Azerbaijan

- National park
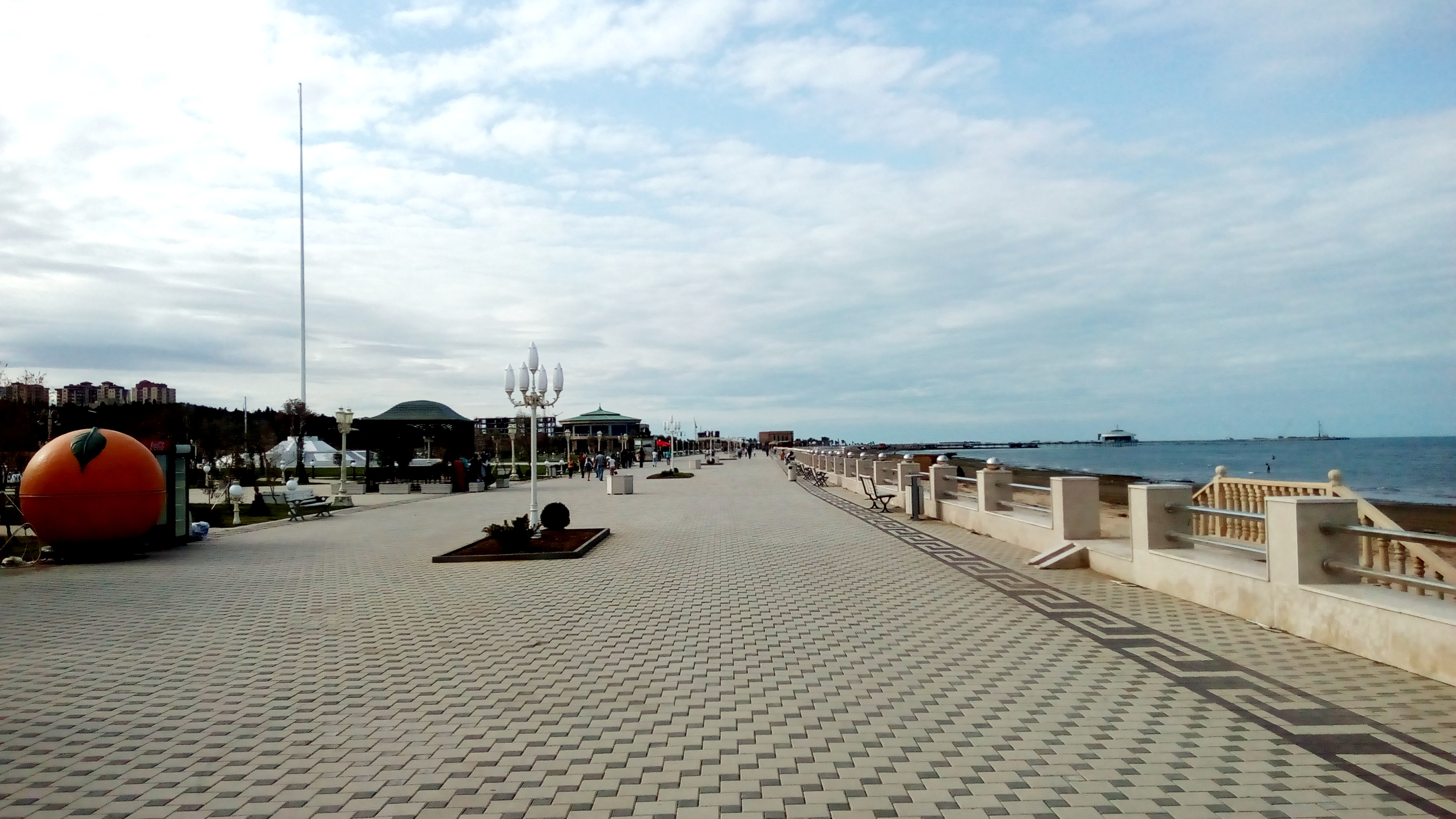
- Interactive map of Sumgait Boulevard
- Type: Public
- Location: Sumgait
- Coordinates: 40°35′27.542″N 49°41′12.754″E
- Opened: 2016

Sumgait Boulevard is a promenade located in the city of Sumgait, along the coast of the Caspian Sea. It was established in 2016.

== History ==
During a visit to Sumgait in July 2011, the President of Azerbaijan, Ilham Aliyev, emphasized the need for a boulevard in the city, suggesting that it should align with the standards of Baku Boulevard.

== Area ==
The total area of the boulevard is 106 hectares, and its length is 4.2 kilometers. The Nasimi Cultural and Recreation Park is also one of the main parts of the boulevard.

Three notable landmarks are located at the upper part of Sumgait Boulevard: Goyarchin Sculpture, Alley of Martyrs, and Nasimi Park. Each of these sites is connected to the boulevard by stairs leading down to the waterfront area.

The boulevard includes a Flag Square, where the state flag of the Republic of Azerbaijan is displayed on a 42-meter-high flagpole. The square also houses a Mugham Center and a Flag Museum.

Additionally, the boulevard features a Green Theatre, an open-air auditorium designed for cultural and entertainment events.

The Boulevard features an ASAN Xidmət Center, offering convenient public services.

== Gallery ==
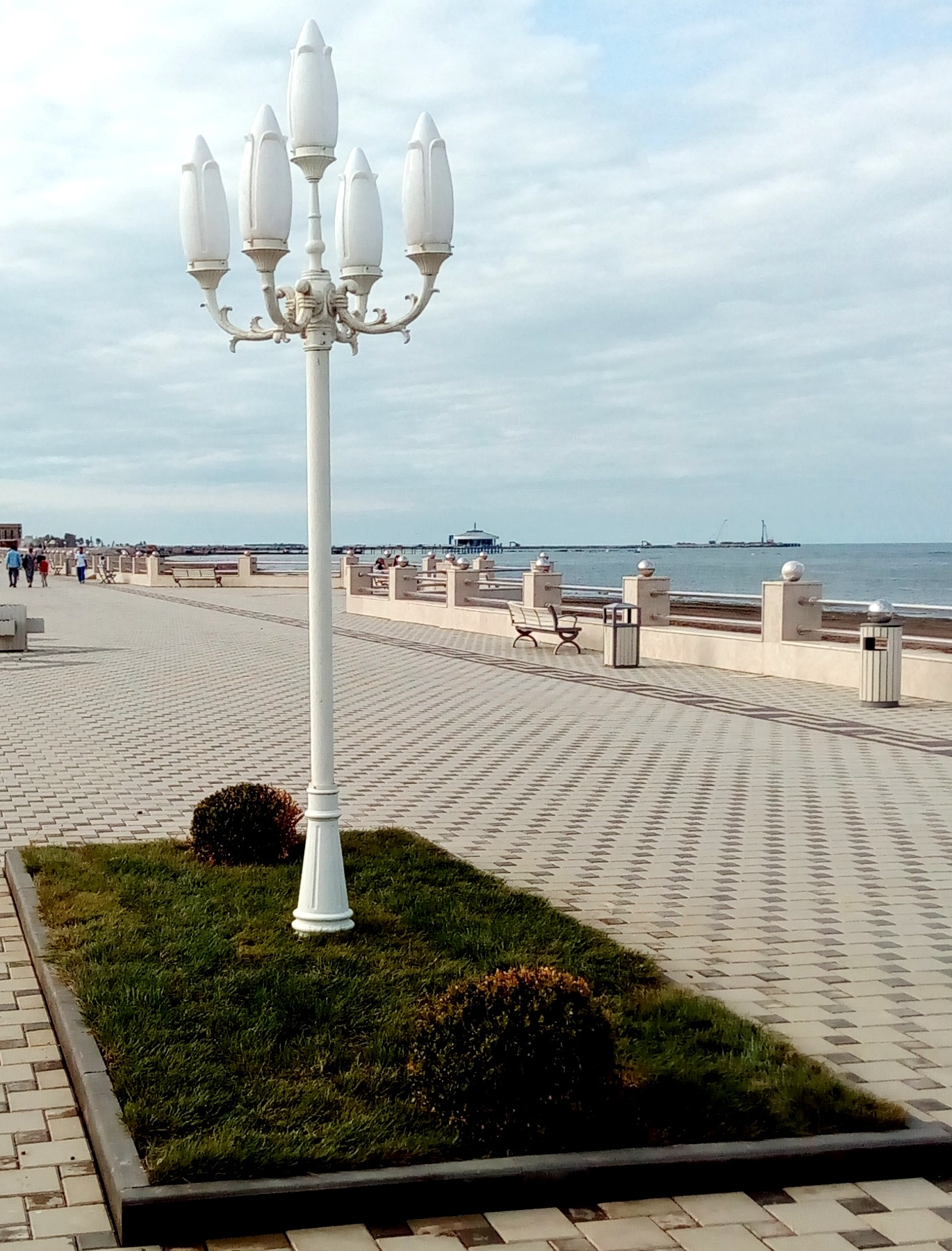

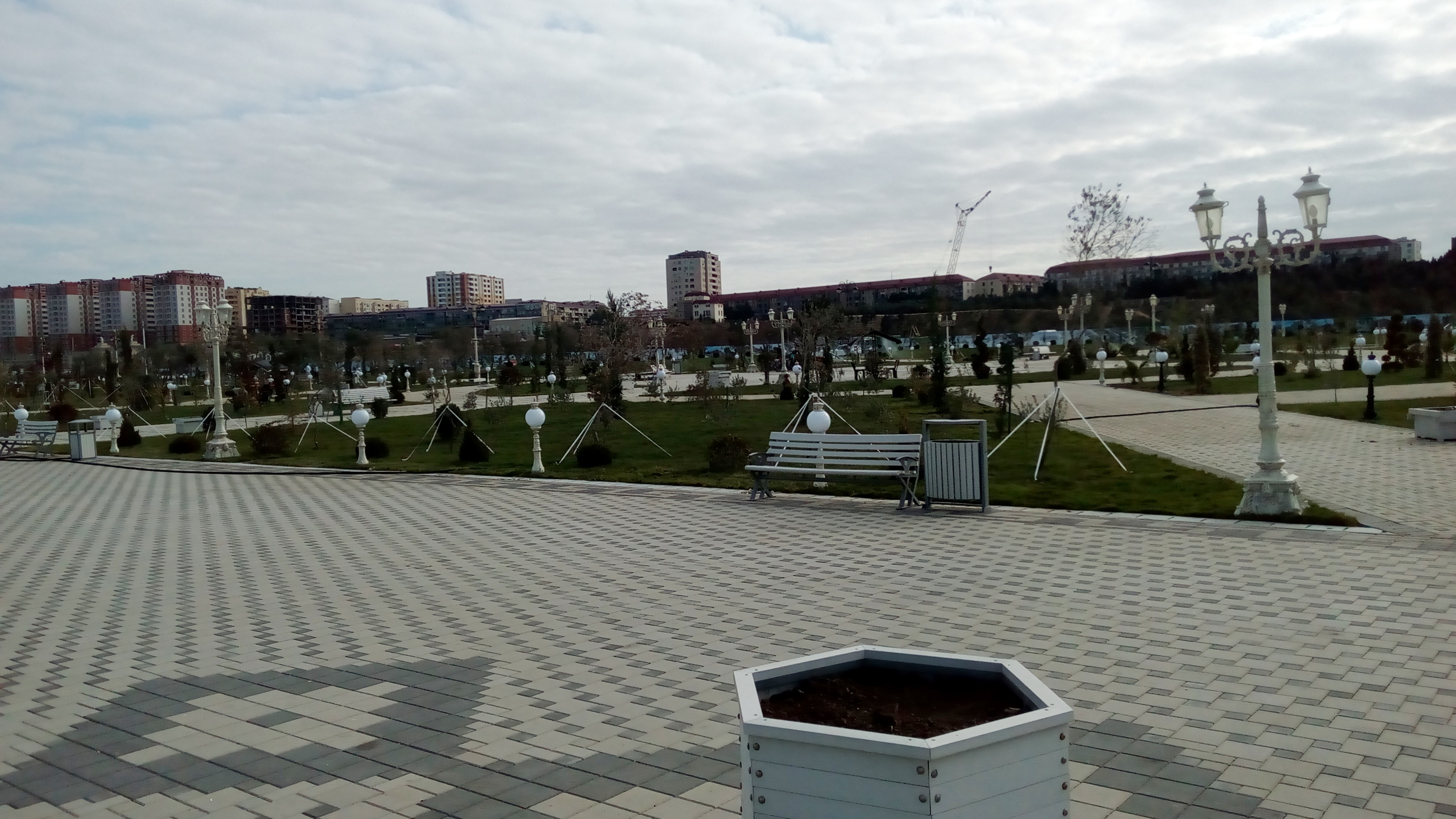

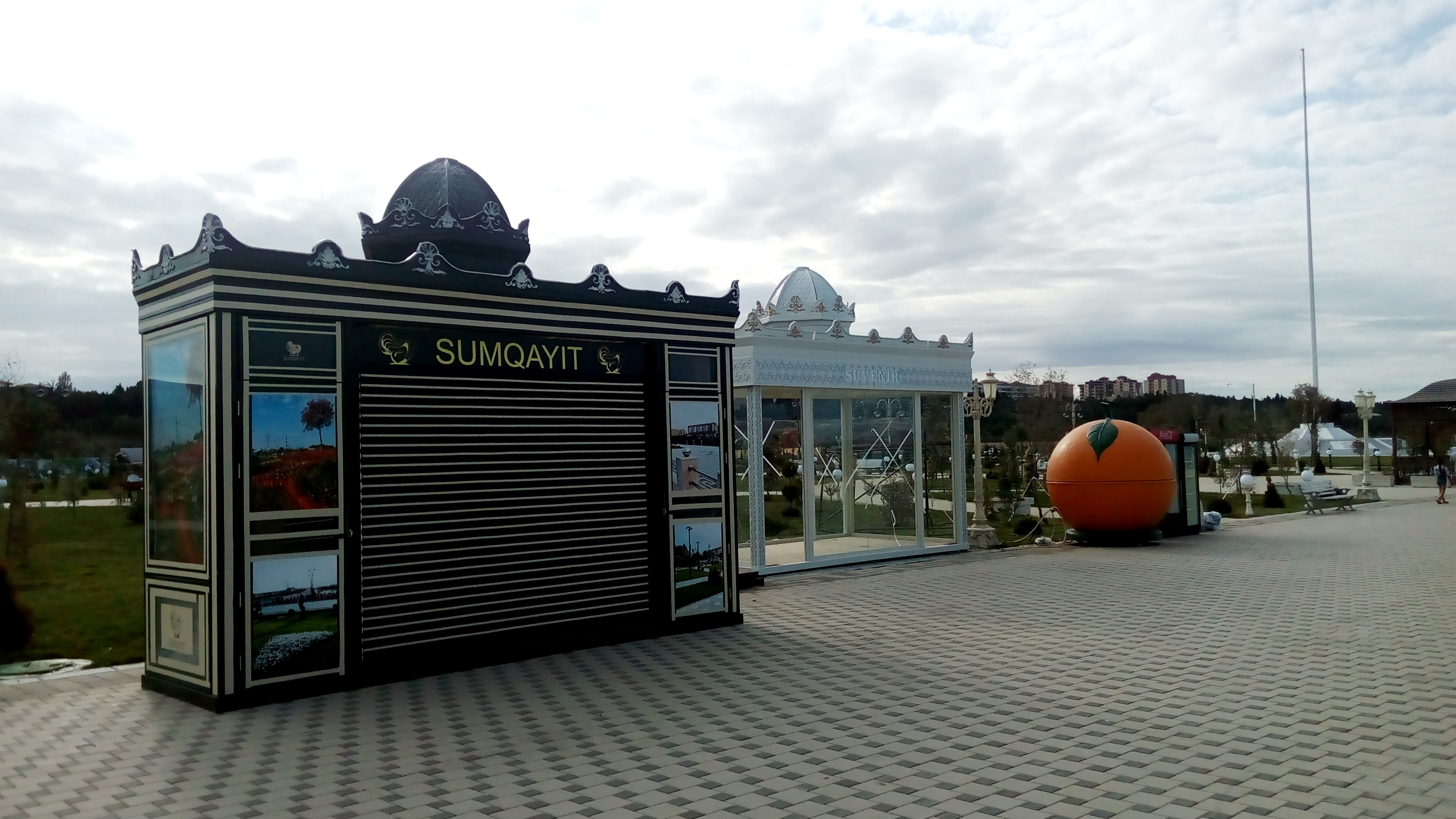

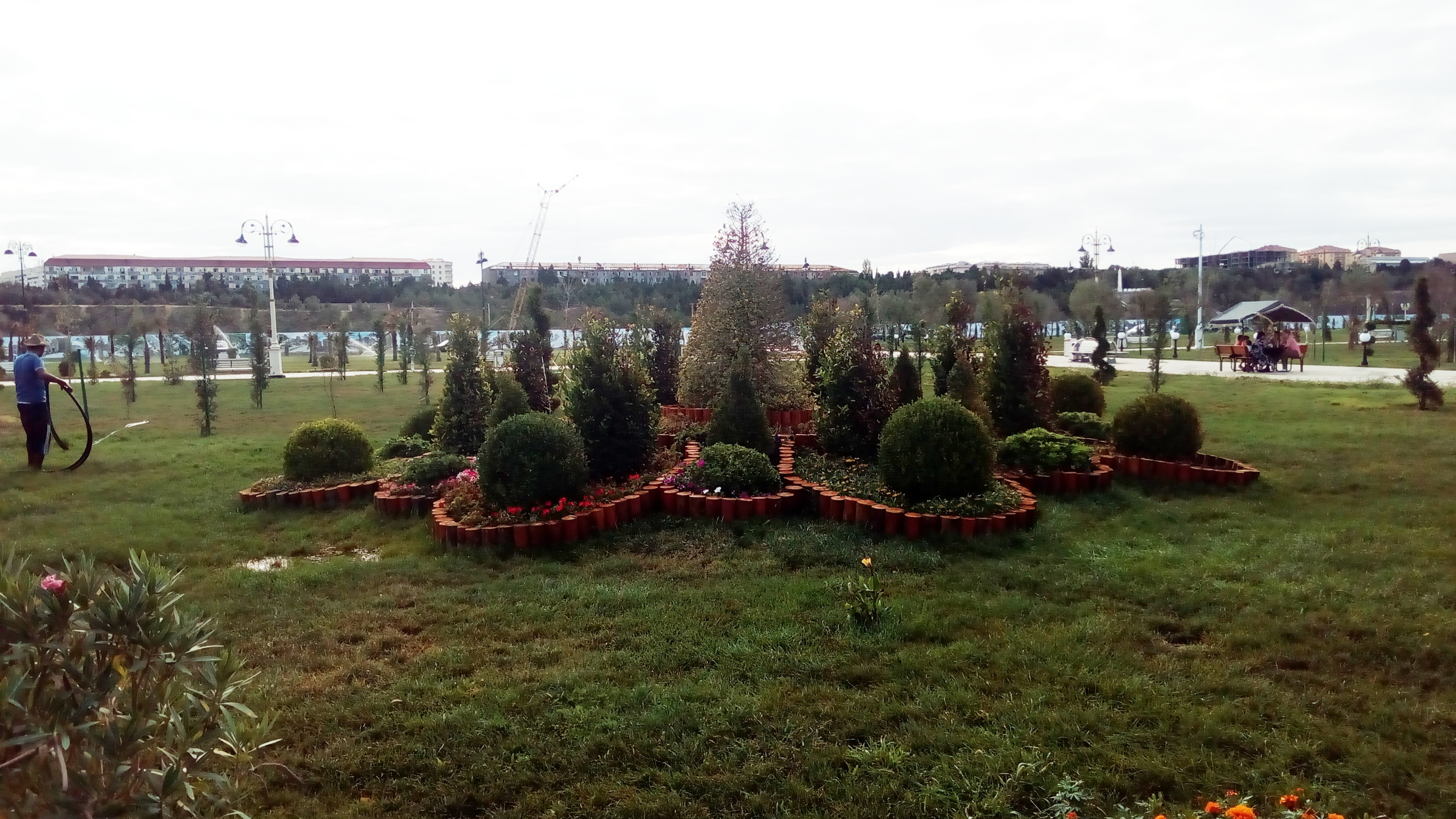
