= Arzu (name) =

Arzu is a feminine Turkish given name and a surname. It is also used as a masculine given name. Notable people with the name are as follows:

== Given name ==
=== Women ===
- Arzu Ceylan, Turkish taekwondo former practitioner
- Arzu Ece (born 1963), Turkish singer
- Arzu Göllü (born 1969), Turkish volleyball player
- Arzu Karabulut (born 1991), Turkish-German football player
- Arzu Özyiğit (born 1972), Turkish basketball player
- Arzu Rana Deuba (born 1962), Nepalese politician and social worker
- Arzu Sema Canbul (born 1973), Turkish footballer
- Arzu Tan (born 1973), Turkish taekwondo former practitioner and coach
- Arzu Toker (born 1952), Turkish-German writer
- Arzu Yanardağ (born 1977), Turkish actress and model

=== Men ===
- Arzu (footballer) (born 1981), Spanish footballer
- Arzu Rahimov (born 1964), Azerbaijani politician

== Surname ==
- Jahanara Arzu (1932–2026), Bangladeshi poet
- Kutbettin Arzu (1955–2023), Turkish politician
- Siraj-ud-Din Ali Khan Arzu (1687–1756), Delhi-based poet

== See also ==
- Arzu (disambiguation)
