= Arzu =

Arzu may refer to:

== Films ==
- Arzu (1961 film), a 1961 Turkish film
- Arzu (1976 film), a 1976 Turkish film
- Arzu (1979 film), a 1979 Turkish film

== Places ==
- Arzu, Khachmaz, a village and municipality in the Khachmaz Rayon of Azerbaijan
- Alternate name of Arzuiyeh, a city in Kerman Province, Iran
- Alternate name of Orzu, Iran, a village in Iran

== Other uses ==
- Arzu (name), a feminine Turkish given name and surname
- Arzu (footballer) (born 1981), Spanish footballer
- ARZU TV, an Afghan satellite TV network

== See also ==
- Arzoo (disambiguation)
