= Arzoo =

Arzoo may refer to:

== Arts and entertainment ==
=== Films ===
- Arzoo (1942 film), a Bollywood film
- Arzoo (1950 film), starring Dilip Kumar
- Arzoo (1965 film), starring Rajendra Kumar
- Aarzoo, 1999 film starring Akshay Kumar, Madhuri Dixit and Saif Ali Khan

=== Television ===
- Arzoo Hai Tu, 2003 Indian television series which aired on Sahara One

=== Fictional characters ===
- Aarzoo, character played by Amrita Puri in Blood Money
- Aarzoo, character played by Rakul Preet Singh in Marjaavaan

== People ==
- Arzoo Govitrikar, Indian model and actress

== See also ==
- Arzu (disambiguation)
