= Kamal Jafarov =

Azerbaijani politician (born 1989)

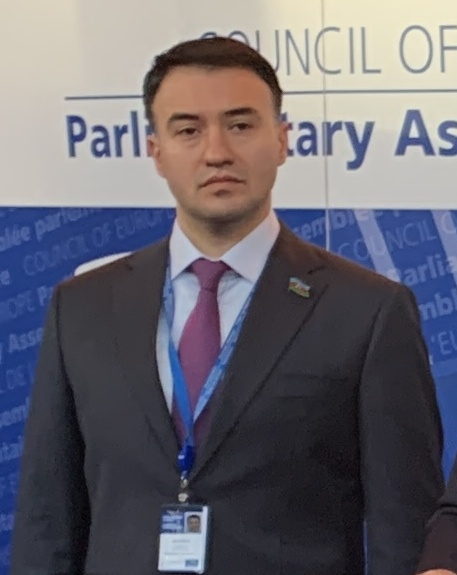

Member of Azerbaijan Parliament
- Incumbent
- Assumed office February 9, 2020

Personal details
- Born: 15 December 1989 (age 36)
- Party: New Azerbaijan Party
- Education: King's College London; International Anti-Corruption Academy; Baku State University
- Committees: Legal Policies and State Building Committee; Defense, Security and Anti-Corruption Committee

Kamal Jafarov (born 15 December 1989 in Baku) is an Azerbaijani politician. He is a Member of the Azerbaijan Parliament, chairperson of the Sub-Committee on Human Rights of the Parliamentary Assembly of the Council of Europe (PACE) and head of Anti-Corruption Training Center near General Prosecutor Office.

== Early life and education ==
Kamal Jafarov earned law degree from Baku State University. He holds an LL.M. degree from King's College London and a MA degree from International Anti-Corruption Academy, which is the first international intergovernmental organization offers a master's degree in anti-corruption studies.

He also graduated from an interdisciplinary program on an "Introduction to the American legal system" from Central Texas College, USA.

Kamal Jafarov is an internationally certified anti-money laundering specialist from ACAMS

He speaks English, French and Russian languages.

He served in the army during 2013–2014. He is married and has one child.

== Career ==
=== Civil service ===
In 2012–2013, he worked as an adviser in the International Relations Department of the State Agency for Public Services and Social Innovations (publicly known as ASAN Service).

During 2014–2016, Kamal Jafarov joined as a senior advisor to the Secretariat of Anti-Corruption Commission of Azerbaijan Republic. At this post he was also working as Secretary of inter-agency working group on improvement of legislation. His duties included liaising with government institutions involved in anti-corruption activities and media and coordinated relations with civil society institutions and international partners.

In 2016, he was appointed the Executive Secretary of the Anti-Corruption Commission of Azerbaijan. During these years, he also acted as a national focal point for Council of Europe project on Good Governance and Fight against Corruption (Eastern Partnership) implemented in Azerbaijan.

In 2020, due to his election to the Parliament of Azerbaijan he left civil service and started a career within the legislative body.

=== Parliament ===
In the 2020 Azerbaijani parliamentary election, Kamal Jafarov was elected an MP from the Sabirabad constituency (No 63) for the term of 2020–2025, representing the New Azerbaijan Party. Currently he is board member of New Azerbaijan Party. In the 2024 Azerbaijani parliamentary election, he was re-elected from Sabirabad constituency.

He is member of two committees in the National Assembly of Azerbaijan (Milli Majlis): Legal Policies and State Structuring Committee, and Defense, Security and Combating Corruption Committee.

== International activities ==
=== Council of Europe ===
He is a deputy chair of the Delegation of Azerbaijan to the Council of Europe (CoE). He is a full member of Committee on Legal Affairs and Human Rights and Committee on Migration, Refugees and Displaced Persons.

During 2017–2021, he headed the delegation of Azerbaijan to the Group of States against Corruption (GRECO) of the Council of Europe

=== Inter-parliamentary relations ===
Kamal Jafarov is the head of Azerbaijan-Belgium Inter-parliamentary friendship group and member of several working group on inter-parliamentary relations with France, United Kingdom, Italy, USA, Hungary, Japan and Australia.

=== Open Government Partnership ===
Kamal Jafarov served as the national focal point of Open Government Partnership international initiative between the years of 2016–2020.

=== United Nations ===
During 2015–2020, Kamal jafarov served as a national coordinator for the implementation of United Nations' Convention Against Corruption. He headed two implementing review mechanisms in Azerbaijan.

== Public activities ==
Kamal Jafarov is the founder of national chapters of European Law Students' Association (ELSA).

He is also co-founder of Azerbaijan Anti-Corruption Academy (later renamed as Azerbaijan Transparency Academy).

== Articles ==
Kamal Jafarov is the author of articles published in The Guardian, The Telegraph, La Vanguardia, Hurriyet Daily News, The Jerusalem Post and other local news web-sites.

== See also ==
- Parliament of Azerbaijan
- The Commission on Combat Corruption of the Republic of Azerbaijan
- Azerbaijan–Belgium relations
- Inam Karimov
- Vusal Huseynov
