= Orzu =

Orzu may refer to:

- Orzu, Iran
- Orzu, Romania
- Orzu, Tajikistan, a town in Jaloliddin Balkhi District, southern Tajikistan
