= Arzu Rahimov =

Azerbaijani politician

Arzu Rahimov Arzu Rəhimov
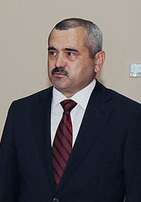

Chief of the State Service for Mobilization and Conscription of Azerbaijan
- In office 13 February 2012 – 17 April 2023
- President: Ilham Aliyev
- Preceded by: office established
- Succeeded by: Mürsal Ibrahimov

Chairman of State Migration Service of Azerbaijan Republic
- In office 30 April 2007 – 13 February 2012
- Preceded by: office established
- Succeeded by: Firudin Nabiyev

First Deputy Chief of State Border Service
- In office 2006 – 30 April 2007

Personal details
- Born: 1 October 1964 (age 61) Nakhchivan, Nakhichevan ASSR, Azerbaijan SSR, Soviet Union
- Party: New Azerbaijan Party

Military service
- Branch/service: State Border Service
- Years of service: 21 years
- Rank: Lieutenant general

Lieutenant general Arzu Rahimov Yusif oglu (Azerbaijani: Arzu Rəhimov Yusif oğlu; born 1 October 1964) is an Azerbaijani politician who served as the Chief of the State Service for Mobilization and Conscription of Azerbaijan from 2012 to 2023.

== Early life ==
Rahimov was born on 1 October 1964, in Nakhchivan, Azerbaijan. In 1982–1986, he studied at High Military Political General Troops Academy in Russia. In 1986–1989, he served in various positions in the Soviet Armed Forces. After restoration of independence of Azerbaijan, he served in the State Border Service of Azerbaijan Republic from 1992 to 2004, and was promoted from Chief Military officer to Military Unit Commander. In 2004, he was conferred with military rank of Major General, and in 2012, with the military rank of Lieutenant general.

== Political career ==
In 2004, he was appointed the head of Khudat unit of border troops. In 2006, Rahimov was appointed First Deputy Chief at the headquarters of Border Troops in Baku. On 30 April 2007, he was appointed the Chairman of newly established State Migration Service of Azerbaijan Republic. He's considered to be a professional officer, knowledgeable in migration issues.

In February 2012, he was appointed the Chief of the State Service for Mobilization and Conscription of Azerbaijan.

Rahimov has been awarded with 10 orders and medals. In addition to his native Azerbaijani, Rahimov is fluent in Russian. He is married and has two children.

== See also ==
- Cabinet of Azerbaijan
