= Vusal =

Vusal is an Azerbaijani male given name. Notable people with the name include:

- Vusal Garaev (born 1986), Azerbaijani football
- Vusal Huseynov (born 1980), Azerbaijani public official
- Vusal Isgandarli (born 1995), Azerbaijani footballer
