= Third degree medal of the Republic of Azerbaijan =

Award of the Azerbaijani Armed Forces

Third degree medal of the Republic of Azerbaijan for "impeccable service in migration bodies"
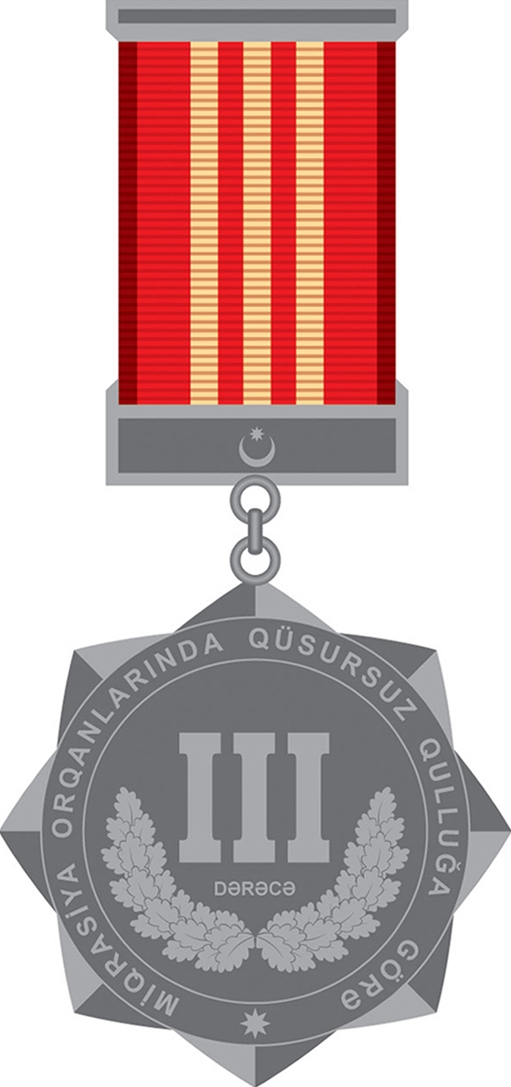
- Third degree medal of the Republic of Azerbaijan for "impeccable service in migration bodies"
- Type: medal
- Awarded for: 10 years of Impeccable Service to the State Migration Service
- Country: Azerbaijan
- Presented by: the state
- Eligibility: active military service before November 16, 2012
- Service Ribbon

The Third Degree Medal for Impeccable Service in Migration Bodies (Azerbaijani: "Miqrasiya orqanlarında qüsursuz qulluğa görə" III dərəcəli medalı) is a state award of Azerbaijan, awarded for service to Azerbaijan's State Migration Service. The award was established on November 16, 2012.

== Description of the medal ==
The medal of the Republic of Azerbaijan for impeccable service in the State Migration Service, or migration bodies, is awarded in three degrees—the medal for the 3rd degree being the lowest—to employees with a special rank of service in migration bodies of the Azerbaijan Republic who have completed 10, 15 and 20 calendar years by March 19 of each year for flawless performance of official duties. The medal of the Republic of Azerbaijan of the 3rd degree "For impeccable service in migration bodies" is awarded to the persons who have served in migration bodies for at least 10 years.

== Sources ==
- Regulations on the medal of the Republic of Azerbaijan "For impeccable service in migration bodies" (in Azerbaijani)
- "Miqrasiya orqanlarında qulluqda fərqlənməyə görə", "Miqrasiya orqanları ilə səmərəli əməkdaşlığa görə" və "Miqrasiya orqanlarında qüsursuz qulluğa görə" Azərbaycan Respublikası medallarının təsis edilməsi ilə əlaqədar "Azərbaycan Respublikasının orden və medallarının təsis edilməsi haqqında" Azərbaycan Respublikasının Qanununda dəyişikliklər edilməsi barədə" Azərbaycan Respublikasının 2012-ci il 2 noyabr tarixli 454-IVQD nömrəli Qanununda dəyişikliklər edilməsi haqqında Azәrbaycan Respublıkasinin Qanunu (in Azerbaijani)
- Article (in Azerbaijani)
- The law - elibrary.az (in Azerbaijani)
- Azərbaycanda miqrasiya sahəsində çalışanlar üçün yeni medallar təsis olundu news.milli.az (in Azerbaijani)
- New medals have been established in Azerbaijan for those working in the field of migration. (in Azerbaijani)
