= Azerbaijan–Belgium relations =

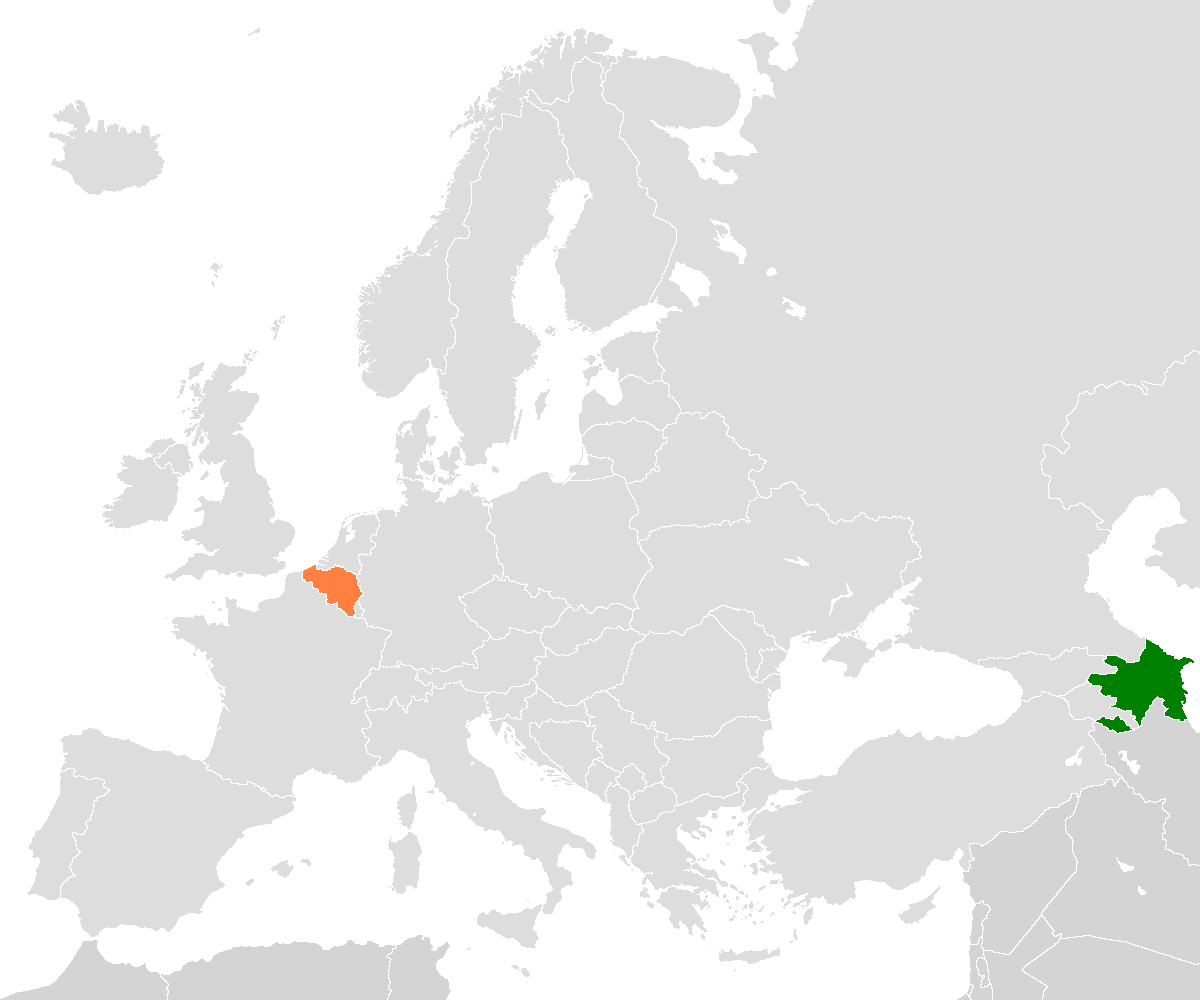

- Azerbaijan: Belgium

The Kingdom of Belgium (Belgium) recognized the independence of the Republic of Azerbaijan (Azerbaijan) on December 31, 1991. Azerbaijan became the first Post-Soviet State to establish diplomatic ties with Belgium on February 20, 1992. Azerbaijan has an embassy in Brussels. Belgium has an embassy in Baku. Both countries are full members of the Council of Europe and the Organization for Security and Co-operation in Europe (OSCE).

== Diplomatic relations ==
Diplomatic relations between Azerbaijan and Belgium were established on June 17, 1992. On 20 February 2017, Belgium celebrated the 25th anniversary of its relations with Azerbaijan. Didier Reynders, Minister of Foreign Affairs of Belgium, welcomed this celebration. In 1995, Azerbaijan opened its Embassy in Belgium. For the end of November 2017, Fuad Isgandarov is Ambassador Extraordinary and Plenipotentiary of Azerbaijan to Belgium and Grand Duchy of Luxembourg / Head of the Mission to the European Union. He was appointed to this post in September 2012. Accordingly, Belgium opened its embassy in Azerbaijan in 2007. For the end of November 2017, Ambassador of Belgium to Azerbaijan is Bert Schoofs.

== Inter-parliamentary relations ==
Both Azerbaijan and Belgium parliaments have inter-parliamentary working groups. For the end of November 2017, Elkhan Suleymanov from Azerbaijan side, and Philippe Blanchart from Belgium side are heads of the respective working groups. On 6–7 April 2005, the Delegation led by H. de Kroo, President of Chamber of Representatives of Belgium, paid a working visit to Azerbaijan, and met with Ilham Aliyev, the President of Azerbaijan.

Since 2020, Kamal Jafarov from Azerbaijan side and Tim Vandenput from Belgium side are the heads of the respective working groups.

== Resident diplomatic missions ==
- Azerbaijan has an embassy in Brussels.
- Belgium has an embassy in Baku.

== See also ==
- Foreign relations of Azerbaijan
- Foreign relations of Belgium
- Azerbaijan-NATO relations
- Azerbaijan-EU relations
