= Corruption in Azerbaijan =

Corruption in Azerbaijan is considered high and occurs at all levels of government. Corruption during the Soviet era was rife and persists into the present. In 2024, Radio Free Europe/Radio Liberty reported that Azerbaijan has regularly ranked near the bottom of Transparency International's Corruption Perceptions Index.

Azerbaijan's economy is characterized by corruption and inequality. The country's oil wealth has significantly strengthened the stability of Ilham Aliyev's regime and enriched ruling elites in Azerbaijan. The country's oil wealth has enabled the state to host lavish international events, as well as engage in extensive lobbying efforts abroad.

In the Azerbaijani laundromat money-laundering scheme, $2.9 billion was paid to foreign politicians and Azerbaijani elites by companies linked to Azerbaijani ruler Ilham Aliyev, government ministries, and the International Bank of Azerbaijan between 2012 and 2014.

Corruption is prevalent in education, health care and business more generally. Bribery, nepotism and cronyism are commonplace. The Aliyev government in Azerbaijan restricts public access to information about the owners and shareholders of Azerbaijani companies.

== International anti-corruption indices and reports ==
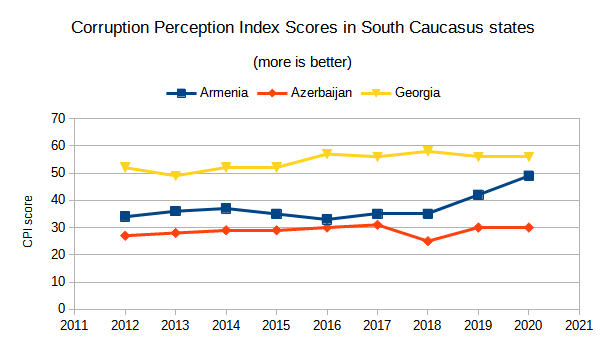
Development of CPI scores of South Caucasus countries 2012-2020

Transparency International reported in 2014 that at that time Azerbaijan was demonstrating steady improvement in anti-corruption rankings, but its progress was relatively slower than that of neighbouring countries. Azerbaijan had advanced with its anti-corruption legislation and strong executive branch; however, the legislature and the judiciary were perceived as weak and potentially more exposed to corruption.

According to a 2015 Transparency International report, Azerbaijan demonstrated improvement in international anti-corruption reports from previous years; however, its position in these indices was weak compared to that of neighbouring countries, such as Georgia, Armenia, and Turkey.

In Transparency International's 2017 Corruption Perceptions Index (CPI), Azerbaijan achieved its best position since its inclusion in the report in 2000, with a score of 31 on a scale from 0 ("highly corrupt") to 100 ("very clean"). In the years 2018-2024 its scores were lower, with a 2024 score of 22.

In the 2025 CPI results, Azerbaijan's score of 30 was a marked improvement from 2024. The scores of Azerbaijan's immediate neighbors in 2025 were Georgia: 50, Armenia: 46, Iran: 23 and Russia: 22. For comparison with regional scores, the best score among Eastern European and Central Asian countries (Note: Albania, Armenia, Azerbaijan, Belarus, Bosnia and Herzegovina, Georgia, Kazakhstan, Kosovo, Kyrgyzstan, Moldova, Montenegro, North Macedonia, Russia, Serbia, Tajikistan, Turkey, Turkmenistan, Ukraine, Uzbekistan) was 50, the average score was 34 and the worst score was 17. Globally, the best score was 89 (ranked 1), the average score was 42, and the worst score was 9 (ranked 181, in a two-way tie).

The World Bank’s Worldwide Governance Indicators reported that Azerbaijan's ability to control corruption increased to 20 (2015) from 7 (2000).

The 2013 Global Corruption Barometer (GCB) report of Transparency International indicated that 9% of respondents in Azerbaijan thought that corruption had increased a lot. While 69% considered that the government's efforts were effective in the fight against corruption. Furthermore, 71% of respondents agreed that an ordinary person can make a difference in the fight against corruption in Azerbaijan. Citizens' participation and the values of integrity, accountability, and transparency were crucial components of fighting corruption. It was important to develop programs and actions to change the cultural understanding of corruption and helped citizens to act against abuses.

In the 2013 GCB report, health, the judiciary, and police were perceived as the most corrupt sectors by respondents. In comparison to the 2010 GCB report, improvement was noted in the more recent report with increased levels of trust in the civil service, education, and police. Contrary to international perceptions, Azerbaijani respondents perceived political parties as one of the least corrupt sectors alongside the media and religious bodies

According to the Global Integrity Index (GIX) (2011), the anti-corruption legislative framework of Azerbaijan is strong (89 out of 100); however, its implementation is very weak (38 out of 100) considering the powers that have been granted by law.

The government of Azerbaijan has also been accused of using corrupt practices to silence critics such as journalists, activists, and opposition figures. For instance, the economist and anti-corruption activist Gubad Ibadoghlu was arrested in 2023 involving alleged counterfeiting and possession of religious extremist materials. The government had previously included Ibadoghlu's nongovernmental group, Economic Research Center, in a sweeping crackdown on civil society in 2014. This NGO conducted research on public finance management, good governance, and budget transparency.

== Family of Ilham Aliyev ==
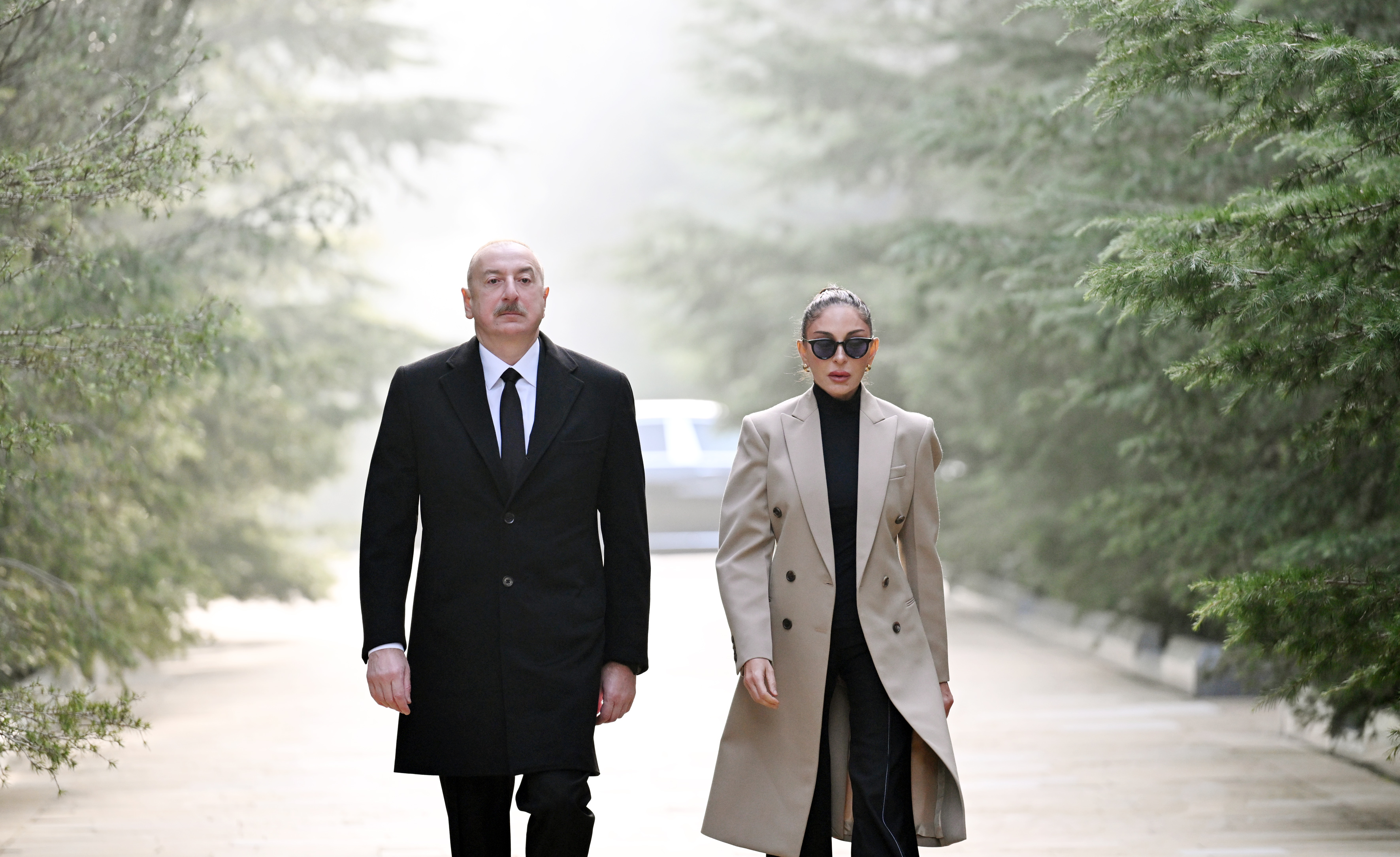
Aliyev and his wife Mehriban Aliyeva were described as the "embodiment of nepotism and kleptocracy" in Azerbaijan.

The Aliyev family have enriched themselves through their ties to state-run businesses. They own significant parts of several major Azerbaijani banks, construction firms and telecommunications firms, as well as partially own the country's oil and gas industries. Much of the wealth is hidden in offshore companies. The 2021 Pandora Papers leaks showed that the Aliyev family built a vast offshore network to hide their money. The family and their close associates have secretly been involved in property deals in the UK worth more than $700 million.

In 2012, the Organized Crime and Corruption Reporting Project called Ilham Aliyev the person of the year in organized crime and corruption. Also in 2012, CNBC produced the film Filthy Rich about corruption which also mentioned the Aliyev family.

Aliyev was also included on a list of figures (others being the Minister of Emergency Situations Kamaladdin Heydarov, head of the Presidential Administration Ramiz Mehdiyev and First Lady Mehriban Aliyeva) accused of accepting bribes of $1 million from MP candidates to guarantee their "election win" and inclusion to the parliament. This high-level corruption scandal is widely called the Gulargate.

The long prison sentences for seven journalists from Abzas Media are widely seen as retaliation for the outlet's investigations into corruption in the family of Ilham Aliyev and his inner circle.

== Political context and background timeline of corruption issues ==
After the dissolution of the Soviet Union in late 1991, the transition period in Azerbaijan was complicated and further prolonged by the inability of the national political elite to ensure the existence of key public institutions during 1991–1993. In addition, during those years, Azerbaijan was forced to engage in military clashes with Armenia over the region of Nagorno-Karabakh. In 1993, as a result of the invasion by Armenia, Azerbaijan lost 20% of its territory. In the same year, the United Nations Security Council adopted four resolutions (822, 853, 874 and 884) which condemned the use of force against Azerbaijan and the occupation of its territories. The UN Security Council demanded from Armenia the immediate, complete and unconditional withdrawal of the occupying forces.

As a result of the war with Armenia, the influx of more than one million refugees and internally displaced people had a devastating impact on both the social and economic situation in Azerbaijan (Badalov and Mehdi, 2004). This tragic event shifted the priority of the country from building public institutions to accommodating internally displaced people (IDPs) and providing them with the necessary living standards. In addition, the collapse of the Soviet Union caused economic paralysis in Azerbaijan. Therefore, the main priorities of the Azerbaijani government were to divert all of its financial and political resources to safeguarding IDPs and to fighting against the invasion by Armenia in the international legal arena.

== Institutional arrangements and coordination mechanisms ==
=== Commission on Combating Corruption ===
Commission on Combating Corruption is set up according to the article 4.2 of the Law of the Republic of Azerbaijan on "Fight Against Corruption" and functions as a specialized agency on combating corruption since 2005. The Executive secretaries of CCC were Inam Karimov, Vusal Huseynov and Kamal Jafarov.

=== Anti-Corruption General Directorate ===
The Anti-Corruption (bribery) General Directorate with the Prosecutor General of the Republic of Azerbaijan was established by the Order of the President of the Republic of Azerbaijan No.114 dated 3 March 2004. Directorate General is a body specialized in the field of preliminary investigation conducted on the corruption crimes, and is subordinated to the Prosecutor General of the Republic of Azerbaijan.

=== ASAN Service ===
To eliminate corruption in public service delivery, a new preventive institution, namely the Azerbaijan service assessment network (ASAN) (asan means “easy” in the Azerbaijani) was established by Presidential Decree in 2012. Currently, this institution provides 34 services for 10 state bodies. It was the first one-stop-shop service delivery model in the world to provide the services of various state bodies rather than only the services of one state body.

No conflict of interest exists between ASAN service employees and Azerbaijani citizens as ASAN service employees do not provide any kind of service themselves. All services are provided by the employees of the 10 state bodies under one roof, based on the standards of the ASAN service. Employees of the ASAN service monitor the work of the state bodies, check for compliance with ethics rules and manage the queue system.

Monitoring report by OECD has praised Azerbaijan "for advancing Azerbaijani Service and Assessment Network (ASAN) centers, which has contributed to eliminating the conditions that are conducive to corruption when delivering various administrative services to the public". Azerbaijan 2016 report by EEAS acknowledged ASAN services have been a great help in the elimination of corruption and bribery, as well as removing bureaucracy in public service delivery.

A similar institution is planned to be established in Afghanistan as well. A Memorandum of Understanding was signed between the State Agency for Public Service and Social Innovations under the President of the Republic of Azerbaijan and Ministry of Finance of the Republic of Afghanistan on 12 July 2016. The aim of the Memorandum is to establish a public service delivery mechanism in Afghanistan based on Azerbaijani model “ASAN service”.

=== Anti-Corruption Academy ===
Azerbaijan Anti-Corruption Academy (Azerbaijani: Azərbaycan Anti-Korrupsiya Akademiyası) is a non-governmental organization established in 2016 for the purpose of raising public awareness on the fight against corruption and promoting the role of education to prevent corruption in Azerbaijan. The Academy (AZACA) offers public lectures, forums, short and long-term training programs, tailor-made programs designed for specific target groups such as civil servants, students and private sector.

AZACA works in cooperation with national chapter of Transparency International, Open Government Partnership Dialogue Platform, Network of NGOs specialized in fighting against corruption, Commission on Combating Corruption, ASAN Service, etc.

AZACA involves Council of Europe certified trainers who have completed the Training-of-Trainers courses within the CoE/EU Joint Project on “Strengthening capacities to fight and prevent corruption in Azerbaijan” to deliver trainings for civil servants on "Ethics and Anti-Corruption Technique".

It is acting also as a center of excellence for research on the fight against corruption and for the preparation of anti-corruption proposals. AZACA developed “National Corruption Barometer” report for the first time in Azerbaijan, based on the methodology of the Transparency International's “Global Corruption Barometer”.

==== Activity ====
Presentation and first lecture of the Azerbaijan Anti-Corruption Academy were organized on 14 May 2016. Conditions that were favorable to the establishment of Azerbaijan Anti-Corruption Academy, objectives and structure of Academy, as well as advantages of participating in AZAKA events, future plans of AZAKA and other information were presented at the beginning of the event. The presentation continued with an interactive discussion about corruption, main root causes of corruption, types of corruption, favourable methods of fighting against corruption and measure corruption. The next training of the Azerbaijan Anti-Corruption Academy (AZAKA) was held on 28 May 2016.

Presentation event of AZACA was held at the National Administration School of France on 24 July 2016. 25 participants - public officials and civil society delegates from France, Egypt, Algeria, Morocco, Ukraine, Brazil, Burkina Faso, Djibouti, Chad, Benin, Niger, and Madagascar were attended at presentation.

The first edition of AZACA quarterly bulletin was published in September 2016.

Series trainings on "Ethics and Anti-Corruption Technique" for members of the civil service with the support of Commission on Combating Corruption and “ASAN Training and Education Center” were held by AZACA in Masalli, Barda, Gabala, Guba and Sabirabad regions in January 2018. More than 120 civil servants attended these trainings.

One of trainings for civil servants on "Ethics and Anti-Corruption Technique" was held on 16 February 2018, with the participation of Vice-Rector for Student Affairs at ADA University, and Head of the ASAN Legal Acts Expertise Sector.

Another training by AZACA on "Anti-Corruption and Ethical Behavior" was held at Academy of Public Administration for master students on 23 February 2017.

== Notable cases ==
Several high-profile corruption cases in Azerbaijan have attracted domestic and international attention:

- Azerbaijani Laundromat (2017): An investigation by the Organized Crime and Corruption Reporting Project (OCCRP) revealed a US$2.9 billion slush fund that operated between 2012 and 2014. The scheme laundered money through European banks and shell companies to pay lobbyists, luxury expenses, and to influence foreign politicians.
- Jahangir Hajiyev and the International Bank of Azerbaijan: Former IBA chairman Jahangir Hajiyev was arrested in 2015 and later sentenced to 15 years in prison for fraud, embezzlement, and abuse of office. The case involved large non-performing loans and alleged misuse of state-backed credit lines. His wife, Zamira Hajiyeva, later became the subject of the UK’s first Unexplained Wealth Order.
- Eldar Mahmudov and Ministry of National Security purge: In 2015, President Ilham Aliyev dismissed Minister of National Security Eldar Mahmudov. Subsequently, numerous senior officials were arrested on charges including extortion, bribery, and abuse of power, in what media described as one of the country’s largest anti-corruption purges.
- Ramin Isayev (2025): In 2025, Ramin Isayev, former general director of SOCAR AQS and one of the Azerbaijan's top oil executives, was sentenced to 14 years in prison after being convicted of embezzlement of over US$30 million, money laundering, abuse of office, and fraud. The court also ordered the confiscation of assets connected to the case. The conviction of Isayev has been characterized by international legal experts as a landmark case in global anti-corruption efforts.

== See also ==
- Azerbaijani laundromat
- ASAN service
- Azerbaijan Anti-Corruption Academy
- International Anti-Corruption Academy
- Open Government Partnership
