= Sulh Street =

Street in Azerbaijan

Coordinates: 40°34′55.3″N 49°39′30.7″E

Sulh street
- Interactive map of Sulh street
- Native name: Sülh küçəsi (Azerbaijani)
- Length: 5,200 km (3,200 mi)
- Location: Sumgait, Azerbaijan
- Postal code: 5004
- From: Baku - Quba highway
- To: Peace Dove

Sulh Street (Azerbaijani: Sülh küçəsi) is the main entrance to Sumgait City, Azerbaijan, extending from the Baku-Quba highway to the Caspian Sea. It is recognized as one of the longest streets in the city and serves as a key thoroughfare.

== History ==
Sulh Street is one of the main thoroughfares in Sumgait, Azerbaijan, extending from the Baku-Guba highway to the Caspian Sea coast. It is among the longest streets in the city and has played a role in its urban development. The street was one of the first areas in Sumgait to undergo beautification and infrastructure improvements. Expansion work was carried out on both sides, increasing the asphalt-covered area to 90,000 square meters to facilitate transportation. A stormwater drainage system, water supply, sewage, and communication lines were installed along a total length of 7 kilometers. Additionally, 100,000 square meters of green space were developed, with over 120,000 trees and decorative plants added. Further infrastructure enhancements included the installation of modern street lighting, with 110 lampposts, and the construction of a 16,000-square-meter fence. At the entrance of the street, Flag Square was established. The name "Sulh," meaning "peace" in Azerbaijani, reflects the multicultural population of Sumgait, symbolizing harmony among its diverse communities. Sulh Street is also home to the "Peace Dove" monument, which was erected in the city's seaside park in 1978. The monument, made of concrete, depicts a dove with open wings and is regarded as a symbol of peace. The street continues to serve as a significant part of Sumgait’s urban landscape, contributing to the city's infrastructure and public spaces. In 2016, Sulh Street underwent significant renovation work, which began in February and was completed in early September. The reconstruction expanded the road width from 14 to 22 meters, introduced new sidewalks, and installed sewage lines, an automatic irrigation system, and modern lighting. Green areas were developed, and decorative walls were constructed along the street. On September 27, 2016, President Ilham Aliyev reviewed the completed renovation project.

== Gallery ==
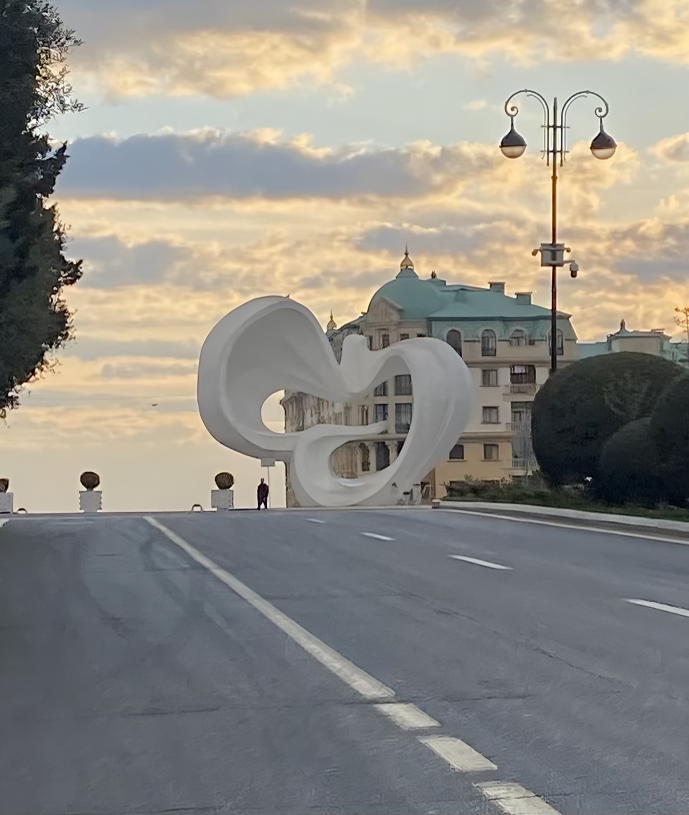
View of the terminus of Sulh Street and the Peace Dove monument

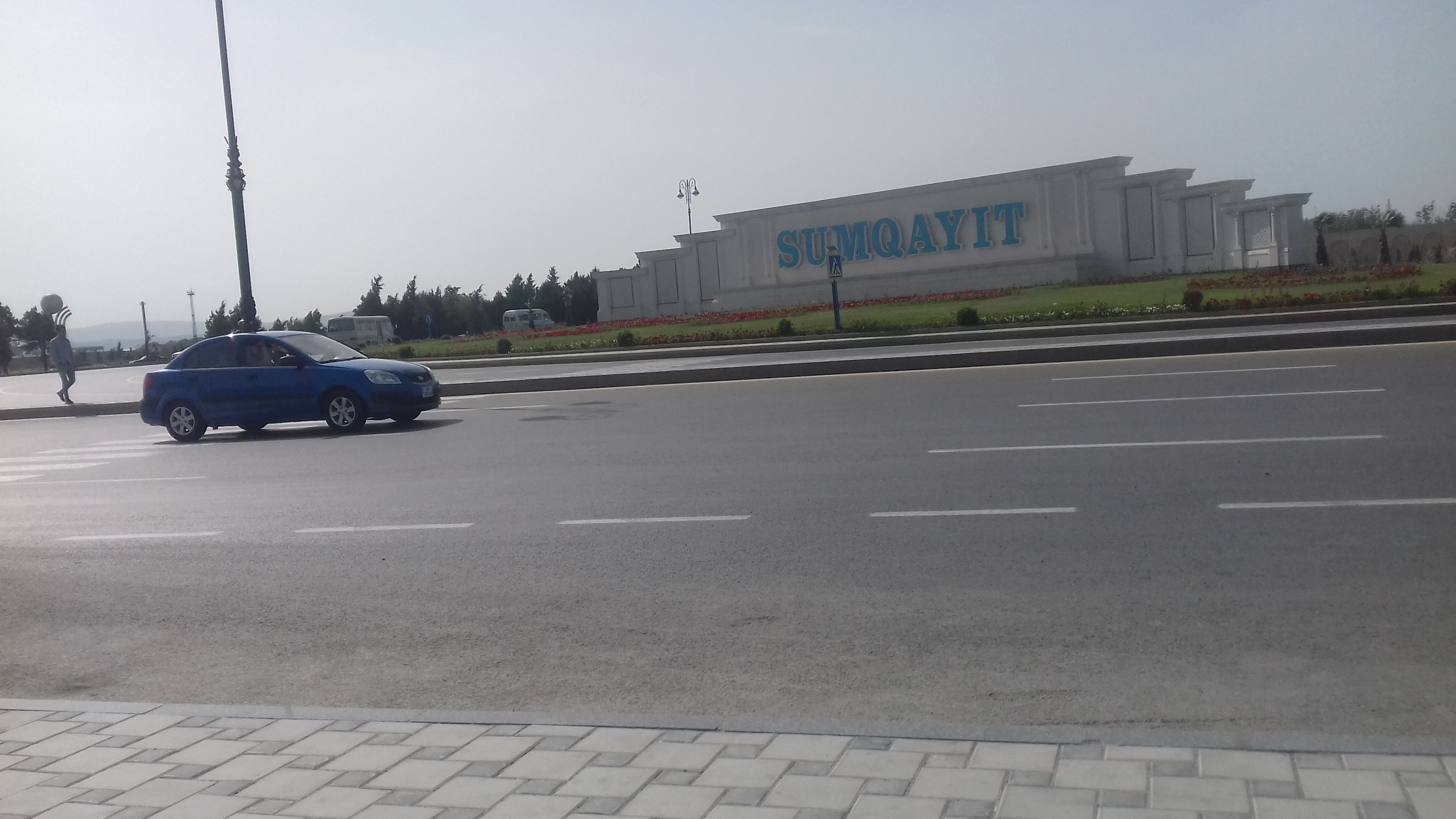
A stone billboard at the entrance of Sulh Street

== On stamps ==
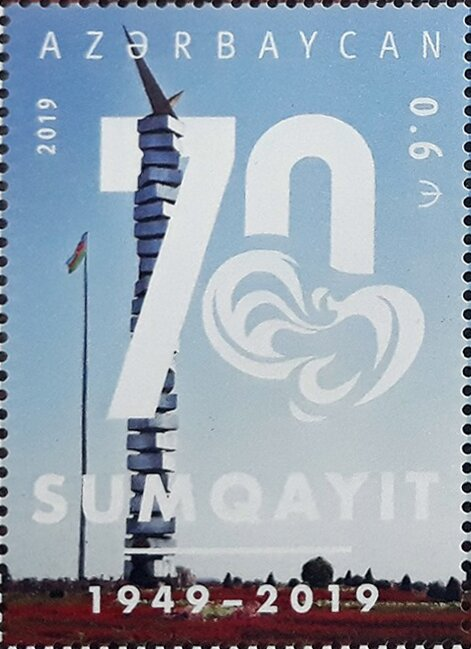

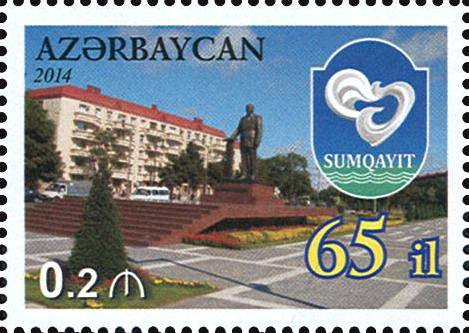
