= Migration policy of Azerbaijan =

In Azerbaijan, migration policy is handled by the State Migration Service, and appropriate departments of Ministry of Labor and Social Protection of Population, Ministry of Healthcare, Ministry of Foreign Affairs, Ministry of İnternal Affairs, State Border Service, State Committee of Republic of Azerbaijan for Refugees and IDPs and State Security Service. Migration Code, Law on Citizenship, Law on Immigration are the foundations of migration policy in Azerbaijan. An independent migration office, the State Migration Service, was established on March 19, 2007 to regulate fast-paced migrants and prepare comprehensive and efficient migration policies.

== Background ==
After gaining independence in 1991, Azerbaijan faced with the significant wave of emigration of its citizens abroad because of the hardships the country was hit by, such as unstable political situation, economic slowdown and internal movement of refugees and IDPs due to Nagorno Karabakh conflict. As years passed, increasing role of the country as a transit country, economic development and implementation of large-scale projects in the fields of energy and transport enabled Azerbaijan to attract growing number of immigrants. Azerbaijan confronted with many-sided problems in the migration processes, therefore a number of actions have been carried out in this field to handle them. Adopting Stated Migration Policy Concept, approving State Migration Program for 2006-2008, establishing State Migration Service were among those actions. Moreover, a Task Force composed of representatives of public bodies was formed to work on the introduction of bio-metric identification. State Program on Bio-metric Identification in the Republic of Azerbaijan was compiled on their recommendations and approved by Ilham Aliyev on February 13, 2007. The Law on National Identity Card of the Republic of Azerbaijan was amended in December 2011 to provide identity cards carry electronic chips containing personal information. Azerbaijan joined he UN Convention on the Protection of the Rights of All Migrant Workers and Members of their Families and Palermo Protocols related to trafficking in persons and smuggling of migrants. Decree on the development of migration management system dated 5 August 2008, Order on Integrated Migration Information System dated 6 February 2009, implementation of “Single Window” system on State Migration Service’s activities starting from 4 March 2009, issuing law-enforcement body status to State Migration Service on 8 April 2009 are among the core activities to improve migration management system.

== State Migration Concept ==
State Migration Management Policy Concept of the Republic of Azerbaijan was approved by the Cabinet of Ministers on 13 July 2004 taking into account the necessity of defining state policy on migration issues for the preparation of the State Migration Program. The concept contains 4 sections: in addition to general provisions and migration related situation in Azerbaijan, these include goals, principles and objectives of migration policy, as well as the mechanism for implementation of Azerbaijan’s state migration policy.

The main directions for Azerbaijan’s state migration policy are: ensuring control over migration processes in Azerbaijan and preventing illegal migration; stimulating Azerbaijani compatriots living abroad to resettle in Azerbaijan and facilitating the return of emigrants, as well as promoting the immigration of qualified specialists and other foreign workers needed on the Azerbaijani labour market; and simplifying entry and residence in Azerbaijan for foreign citizens doing business in Azerbaijan.

The main mechanisms for implementing the concept are: improving the legislation of the Republic of Azerbaijan on migration; advancing the migration management system and coordinating the activities of migration management bodies; establishing unified state information system on migration issues; developing cooperation with international organizations and relevant government agencies of foreign countries to regulate migration processes.

== State Migration Program ==
The State Migration Policy Concept of Azerbaijan was followed by the State Migration Program of the Republic of Azerbaijan for 2006-2008. The Program was approved by the President of Azerbaijan on 25 July 2006. This Program was set up to implement required actions in order to achieve the objectives mentioned in the Migration Policy Concept.

The Program contains 3 sections - general information and characteristics of migration related processes of Azerbaijan, main directions of state migration policy of Azerbaijan and international cooperation in this area. In addition, measures to be implemented within the framework of the State Migration Program are also defined.

According to the Program, the main purpose of state migration policy of Azerbaijan is to regulate migration flows while ensuring national security and interests of Azerbaijani Republic and prevent negative consequences of uncontrolled migration processes. The main objectives of migration policy of Azerbaijan are defined in the Program as efficient use of migration processes for the country’s development; implementation of state programs and measures related to migration in comply with the interests of society and people; prevention of illegal migration; establishing necessary condition to accelerate adaptation process of migrants to existing socioeconomic situation; protection of rights of migrants.

Implementation of the state migration policy implies the activities of the relevant state bodies in the following main directions within the framework of this State Program:

- improving the migration management mechanism;
- establishing legal basis for identification of mutual rights and obligations of migrants and the state;
- increasing the effectiveness of state regulation of migration,
- announcing quotas for receiving immigrants, taking into account the needs of the domestic labor market;
- taking relevant measures to eliminate negative cases in relevant state bodies dealing with migration issues;
- implementation of complex measures to prevent illegal migration;
- cooperation with foreign countries' migration services and international organizations for the solution of migration related problems.

== Government agencies responsible for migration processes ==
However State Migration Service is fully responsible for migration processes, other state bodies - Ministry of National Security, Ministry of Internal Affairs (MIA), Ministry of Foreign Affairs (MFA), State Border Service, Ministry of Labour and Social Protection of the Population, State Committee on Refugees and Internally Displaced Persons – also handles migration related issues in the framework of their activities.

New department related to migration service - Chief Passport and Registration and Migration Department - inside the Ministry of Internal Affairs was established by the Presidential Decree on June 29, 2005, which came into force on May 16, 2006. It is a detached structural fraction within MIA and registers nationals of Azerbaijan or other states, and stateless persons, issues identity documents to foreign citizens, as well as national passports to Azerbaijani citizens, and conducts immigration matters within the MIA’s authorities.

=== State Migration Service ===
In order to fulfill state policy on migration, improve the management system of migration processes, and coordinate activities of different state bodies on migration processes, State Migration Service of the Republic of Azerbaijan was formed on March 19, 2007 according to the Decree issued by the President of Azerbaijan. State Migration Service deals with citizenship applications, Issuing permits for foreigners and stateless persons to live temporarily in Azerbaijan, prolonging temporary residence permit of foreigners and stateless persons, conferring immigrant or refugee status to foreigners.

=== Ministry of Foreign Affairs ===
Ministry of Foreign Affairs is responsible for processing visa requests of foreigners through more than 60 embassies and consulates of Azerbaijan; rendering consular services to Azerbaijani citizens living abroad; registering Azerbaijani citizens residing permanently or temporarily abroad; promoting and ensuring co-operation with international organizations and partner countries on migration issues.

The main partner of Azerbaijan for cooperation on migration issues is the International Organization for Migration (IOM). Azerbaijan received different kinds of assistance from IOM since 1996 and became the member of IOM in 2001. Azerbaijan also cooperates with the European Union and OSCE on migration activities. In the framework of European Neighborhood Policy, Action Plan was adopted between Azerbaijan and EU in November 2006. The Action Plan covers various matters like border management, asylum issues, migration management, prevention of illegal migration, readmission dialogue, reintegration of returned migrants, and simplification of visa procedures.

== Legal framework ==
Legislation concerning migration includes the Constitution, international treaties Azerbaijan is a party to, national laws and other legal acts. The Constitution provides equal rights for foreigners to fulfill the same duties as Azerbaijani citizens, unless otherwise provided by law or international agreements that have been ratified by Azerbaijan.

Legal acts adopted to manage migration processes in Azerbaijan include:

- Law on entry, exit and passports (14 June 1994);
- Law on the state border of the Republic of Azerbaijan;
- Law on the identity card of citizens of the Republic of Azerbaijan (14 June 1994);
- Law on the legal status of foreigners and stateless persons (March 13, 1996);
- Law on registration based on residence and actual address (4 April 1996);
- Law on the citizenship of the Republic of Azerbaijan (September 30, 1998);
- Law on Immigration (22 December 1998);
- Law on labor migration;
- 1999 Law On the Legal Status of Refugees and Displaced Persons;
- 2002 Law On State Policy Concerning Citizens Residing Abroad (amended in 2003).

=== Migration Code ===
Migration Code of the Republic of Azerbaijan was approved by the President Ilham Aliyev on 2 July 2013 in order to establish norms related to implementation of state policy of Azerbaijan on migration issues, to regulate migration processes and legal status of foreigners and stateless persons in Azerbaijan.

The Code contains 6 sections. In addition to general provisions, these include entry to and exit from the territories of Azerbaijani Republic, necessary documentations related to migration processes, labor migration, legal status of foreigners and stateless persons in Azerbaijan, and expulsion of foreigners and stateless persons from the territory of Azerbaijan.

The Code provides a legal explanation of the terms of foreigner, stateless person, passport, temporarily staying in the Republic of Azerbaijan, temporary and permanent residence in the Republic of Azerbaijan, labor migration, close relatives, work permit, visa, place of residence, location and other migration related terms. In addition, the Code outlines the objectives of recording migration activities, the grounds for conducting and implementing migration record. The classification of visas is fully provided in the Migration Code for the first time in the legislation of Azerbaijan. The provision of state regulation of labor migration has been reflected in this Code. It regulates not only the legal status of foreigners and stateless persons, but also citizens of the Republic of Azerbaijan participating different kinds of migration processes.

=== International legal framework ===
- Convention on the Status of Refugees (1951) and its complementing Protocol (1967);
- Convention relating to the Status of Stateless Persons (1954);
- Convention on Elimination of Statelessness (1961);
- UN Convention on Combating Transnational Organized Crime;
- UN Protocol “on Prevention, Elimination and Prosecution of Trafficking in Human Beings, especially that of women and children”, complementing the UN Convention on Combating Transnational Organized Crime;
- UN Protocol “on Combating Smuggling of Migrants through Land, Sea and Air”, complementing the UN Convention on Combating Transnational Organized Crime;
- International Convention on Protection of All Migrant Workers and their Families;
- Agreement on Cooperation among the Members of the Commonwealth of Independent States (CIS) in the area of Combating Illegal Migration;
- Agreement on Cooperation among the Members of the Commonwealth of Independent States (CIS) in the area of Combating Trafficking of Human Beings and Organs.

== Citizenship ==
Azerbaijani Citizenship Law was adopted on 30 September 1998. Azerbaijani citizenship is not determined by place of birth but by having one or both parents who are citizens of the state. Persons with at least one Azerbaijani parent are automatically granted Azerbaijani nationality at birth. The requirements for General Naturalization are as follows:

- Must have had domicile address Azerbaijan for more than five consecutive years;
- Must be a legal adult having lawful source of income;
- Must undertake to comply with the Constitution and legislation of the Republic of Azerbaijan;
- Must be able to read, write, and speak and understand official state language – Azerbaijani.

Dual citizenship is not recognized in Azerbaijan. The person loses Azerbaijani citizenship in case he acquires citizenship of any other state.

== Labor migration ==
Labor migration is regulated by the “Law on Labor migration”, Labor Code, and Migration Code of Azerbaijani Republic through applying labor migration quota, granting work permits, moreover, issuing special licences (permit) for mediation activities for employment of citizens of Azerbaijan in foreign countries.

Able-bodied foreigners and stateless persons over 18 years old can work in Azerbaijan after getting work permit. Legal entities should get a special permit from in order to employ foreigners. Labor contract should be signed with foreigners for the validity period of their work permit. The employment contract is not allowed to be signed without a work permit.

According to the amendment (7 October 2011) on the decision of Cabinet of Ministers (6 December 2000) on “Approval of the Rules for issuance of individual permit for foreigners to execute paid labor activities in the territory of the Republic of Azerbaijan and submitting exemplary of the individual permit”, individual permits for foreigners are issued by the State Migration Service taking into account the feedback by Ministry of Labor and Social Protection.

The persons who got immigrant status, as well as heads of representative offices and branches of foreign legal entities, and foreign citizens engaged in entrepreneurship activities in Azerbaijan can work without work permits.

Azerbaijan is party to international agreements on regulating labor migration: Agreement on cooperation in the field of labor migration and social protection for migrant workers, adopted by CIS Member States entered into force in 1996, International Convention on the Protection of the Rights of All Migrant Workers and Members of their Families was ratified in 1999, Protocol on amendments to the Agreement on cooperation in the field of labor migration and social protection for migrant workers, adopted by CIS Member States was signed in 2005, CIS Convention on the legal status of migrant workers and m embers of their families, coming from the CIS participating states entered into force in 2010.

Work Permit

Every legally capable foreigner or stateless person above 18 years is entitled to perform labour activities within the territory of the Republic of Azerbaijan after getting working permit through legal entities, individuals dealing with entrepreneurship activity not establishing legal entity and branches and representative offices of foreign legal entities that employed him in a way and at terms stipulated in this Code. Legal entities, physical persons engaging in entrepreneurship not establishing a legal entity and branch and representative offices of foreign legal entity shall get a working permit for every foreigner or stateless person they want to employ.

Applications for a working permit should be reviewed within 20 days. A working permit is issued for 1 year or for a lesser period if the employment contract is signed for the period under 1 year. The duration of the working permit can be extended each time for maximum of 1 year. Official state fee of work permits are up to 3 month is 350 manats (AZN), up to 6 month is 600 manats (AZN) and up to 1 year is 1000 manats (AZN).

Citizens of Azerbaijani Republic working abroad must register in Azerbaijan’s appropriate diplomatic representation.

== Irregular migration ==
Irregular migration to Azerbaijan is the act of foreigners entering Azerbaijan, without government permission and in violation of the given nationality law, or staying beyond the termination date of a visa, also in violation of the law.

Deporting irregular migrants is regulated by the Code of Administrative Offences, Code of Execution of Punishments of the Republic of Azerbaijan and the Code on Migration.

Irregular migrants from the Middle East and Central Asia use Azerbaijan as a transit country to move towards North, East and West considering its geographical situation. Irregular migrants mainly from Iran, Iraq, Afghanistan, Pakistan, and South-East Asian countries go through Azerbaijan to reach Russia, Georgia, and Turkey. Bulgaria, Sweden, France, Switzerland, Germany and Norway are the mostly intended destinations for irregular migrants trying to move through Azerbaijan.

In order to deal with irregular immigrants special branch – Office of combating against illegal immigration was established within the Main Passport, Registration and Migration Department of MIA of the Republic.

Foreigners and stateless persons having received an expulsion order but refusing to leave the territory of the Azerbaijan are placed in the Detention Centers for Illegal Migrants (located in Baku and Yevlakh) until being deported in compliance with the court decision issued on the basis of appeal from relevant executive authority. Those who applied for obtaining refugee status are not detained.

== See also ==
- Immigration to Azerbaijan
- State Migration Service of Azerbaijan
