= ASAN Imza =

Organisation in Azerbaijan

- Website: asanimza.az

ASAN Imza (Easy signature), established by Azerbaijani's Ministry of Taxes in partnership with ASAN Service Center and Ministry of Communication and Technologies, is service that allows a client to use a mobile phone as a form of secure electronic ID.

Like the ID Card, it can be used for accessing secure e-services and digitally signing documents, but does not require an ID card reader. The system is based on a specialized Mobile-ID SIM card which the customer requests from the mobile phone operator. Private keys are stored on the mobile SIM card along with a small application for authentication and signing.

Asan İmza (Mobile ID) is the first step toward Ubiquitous government in Azerbaijan – U-government, which can be viewed as a comprehensive set of e-government. It reflects new forms of interaction and transaction that are possible anywhere and at any time on various devices, due to the pervasive availability of networks, applications and services.

== Awards ==
- Global mobileGov (2017)

== See also ==
- ASAN service
