= Immigration to Azerbaijan =

Azerbaijan, though not a popular destination for immigrants, has recently experienced waves of immigration with the collapse of the Soviet Union, especially from ethnic Azerbaijanis mostly from Armenia (as refugees), Russia and the rest of the former Soviet Union. Meskhetian Turks were also relocated to Azerbaijan from Central Asia before and after the end of the Soviet Union. With the booming petroleum industry, immigration from Turkey has also followed. In 2010, every eighth resident in Azerbaijan was a migrant, of whom more than 90% of them are Azerbaijanis and 70% are internally displaced persons from the territories occupied by Armenia.

== History ==
In the post-Soviet period hundreds of people immigrated to Azerbaijan. But between 1989 and 1990 Azerbaijan faced with mass emigration. The main reasons of this emigration were difficulties in the transition and economic crisis as Azerbaijan was in the state of war. According to the official sources, emigration and immigration mainly occurred after the collapse of the USSR, between 1990 and 1992.

Azerbaijan faced a mass influx of refugees originating from other former Soviet Republics, especially Armenia after the collapse of the Soviet Union. Soon these flows declined, but immigrant flow from neighboring Middle Eastern states increased. From 1991 to 2011 about 410 thousand migrants arrived in Azerbaijan for permanent residence. In 2008 Azerbaijan was not emigration donor country anymore. Between 2008 and 2010 totally 4,700 people left, 8,100 people immigrated to Azerbaijan. Most of them were citizens of the CIS. Between 2008 and 2010 only 953 persons immigrated to Azerbaijan from other countries, including 10 people from the United States and 9 from Germany.

In 2006 Azerbaijani President approved a decree on State Migration Program of the Republic of Azerbaijan for 2006-2008 which was aimed at the establishment of state-of-the-art migration management system in Azerbaijan. So far more than 20 legislative acts related to migration issues have been adopted in Azerbaijan. In order to protect the rights of migrants, Azerbaijan has acceded to the UN Convention on the Protection of the Rights of All Migrant Workers and Members of their Families and Palermo Protocols.

Action Plan between Azerbaijan and the European Union was adopted within the European Neighborhood Policy in November 2006. The Action Plan included migration related issues such as migration management, asylum issues, prevention of illegal migration, dialogue on readmission matters, reintegration of returned migrants, visa facilitation.

== Effect of immigration ==
=== Demographic facts ===
The specialists define three groups of immigrants in Azerbaijan such as ethnic Azeris who resided in other republics of the USSR for a long time (mostly Russia and to a less extent Ukraine), but move to the country most often (Talysh, Lezghins, Avars, etc.), ethnic Azeries, mostly coming from Georgia, and labor immigrants from different countries (Turkey, India, Pakistan, etc.) In 1990s, refugees from other countries began to immigrate to Azerbaijan, especially from Russia (Chechens), as well as from Afghanistan and Iraq regarding to various conflicts in these regions. In parallel, religious missionaries and migrant workers from Eastern countries, among which Turks and Iranians were dominated, immigrated to Azerbaijan.

According to the report of State Migration Service of Azerbaijan 208 foreigners (Afghanistan-94 people, Pakistan-77 people, Iran-29 people, Iraq-5 people) applied for asylum in Azerbaijan. Two of them received refugee status (totally 5 people together with family members.)

As immigration rules was tightened in Russia in 2006, Chinese migrants, as well as citizens of Vietnam, Laos, Cambodia and other far eastern countries began to immigrate to other countries, as well as to Azerbaijan. According to the official data of the Ministry of Interior, there were up to 1,000 Chinese people in 2008.

=== Economic ===
Immigrants pay 1,000 manats ($587,96) in taxes each year to work in Azerbaijan for five years.

12,898 migrants from 95 countries were registered as of 2012. Labor migrants mostly came to Azerbaijan from Turkey and Georgia. Turkish migrants are mainly work in the construction sector. Georgian migrants choose the service sectors of the Azerbaijani economy.

== Religious and cultural adaptation ==
96 percent of Azerbaijani population is Muslims. But all religious confessions are equal before the law. Until Islam, the religions such as Zoroastrianism and Christianity already existed in Azerbaijan. Currently, Islam is the dominant religion in Azerbaijan.

Director General of ISESCO Dr. Abdulaziz Othman expressing his attitude to religious tolerance in Azerbaijan stated: “ISESCO has to reveal to the whole world how ancient and rich culture you have. We will accomplish all requirements from our side in terms of implementing documents signed in the field of cooperation with your country and this cooperation will be a sample for other member states.”

During his visit to Azerbaijan in 2002 Rome Patriarch Bartholomew I stated: “I got satisfied from the level of religious tolerance. In Azerbaijan everyone can practice religion and carry out rites on his/her own will.” Immigrants from different nationalities do not face any difficulties in adapting to the country. As different cultural communities such as Russians, Ukrainians, Lacs, Lezgins, Slavians, Tats, Tatars, Georgians, Ingiloys, Talishians, Avars, Meskhetian turks, European and mountain Jews, Germans and Hellenes exist in all regions of Azerbaijan, rich cultural and spiritual heritage was formed in Azerbaijan throughout the centuries.

== Immigration regulations ==
=== Immigration Options for Foreign Citizens ===
According to the Migration Law, there are several legal grounds for migrating to Azerbaijan. Some of these include: foreigners doing business in the country; foreigners who have invested at least AZN 100,000 in real estate or hold a bank deposit of the same amount in Azerbaijan; foreigners who have obtained a work permit and are engaged in paid labor; and foreigners who are family members of residence permit holders or close relatives of Azerbaijani citizens.

=== Refugees and Asylum-seekers ===
According to the Migration Code of Azerbaijan, foreigners who are being discriminated against in their home countries due to their religion, political or religious views, or who face life-threatening situations, can apply for refugee or asylum status in Azerbaijan. Under the law, foreigners who have applied for asylum or refugee status are allowed to engage in paid labor without the need for a work permit.

=== Illegal immigration ===
Illegal (sometimes termed irregular) immigrants in the Azerbaijan include those who have:

- entered Azerbaijan without authority
- entered with false documents
- overstayed their visas

In 2010, The State Migration Service of Azerbaijan has expelled 8 500 foreign citizens or stateless persons.

== See also ==
- Immigration to Europe
- State Migration Service of the Republic of Azerbaijan
- List of countries by immigrant population
- List of sovereign states and dependent territories by fertility rate
- Migration Policy of Azerbaijan
- Migration Code of the Republic of Azerbaijan
