= Arzu Sema Canbul =

Turkish footballer (born 1973)

Personal information
- Date of birth: July 14, 1973 (age 53)
- Place of birth: Bad Urach, West Germany

Senior career*
Years	Team	Apps	(Gls)
1995–1996	Gürtaşspor		
1996–1998	Zara Ekinlispor		
1998–1999	Dostlukspor		

International career
1995	Turkey	1	
- * Club domestic league appearances and goals

Arzu Sema Canbul (born July 14, 1973) is a Turkish former women's association footballer.

== Early life ==
Canbul was born in Bad Urach in the state of Baden-Württemberg, West Germany.

== Playing career ==
=== Club ===
In Turkey, she played in 1995–96 women's football league season for the Ankara-based club Gürtaşspor. During the 1996–97 season, she moved to Istanbul to play for Zara Ekinlispor and helped the team win a championship title during the 1997–98 season. During the 1998–99 season, she transferred to Dostlukspor.

=== International ===
Canbul was admitted to the women's national football team and debuted at the UEFA Women's Euro 1997 qualification-Group 8 match against Bulgaria on October 21, 1997.

== Honours ==
Turkish Women's Football League

- Zara Ekinlispor
  - Champion (1): 1997–98
