= Arzu, Khachmaz =

Coordinates: 41°24′N 48°42′E

Arzu
- Municipality

- Location within Azerbaijan
- Country: Azerbaijan
- District: Khachmaz

Population
  - Total: 1,249
- Time zone: UTC+4 (AZT)

Arzu is a village and municipality in the Khachmaz District of Azerbaijan. It has a population of 1,249.
