= Arzoo (1942 film) =

1942 film

- Directed by: M. Issa; R.M. Vaidya
- Release date: 1942
- Country: India
- Language: Hindi

Arzoo is a 1942 Indian Hindi-language film directed by M. Issa and R. M. Vaidya. The film was released during the early 1940s, a period marked by the expansion of the Indian film industry despite wartime constraints.
