= Nasimi Park =

Park in Sumgait, Azerbaijan

- Nəsimi parkı
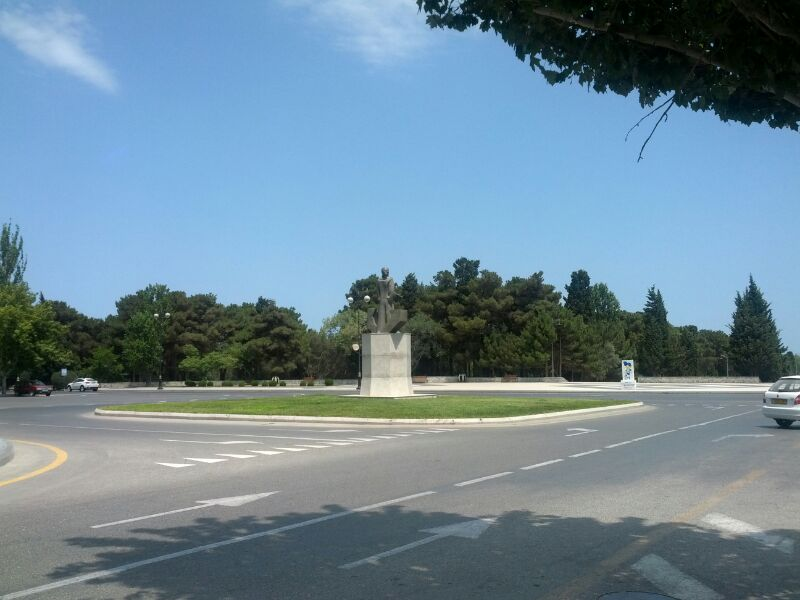
- Statue of Imameddin Nasimi which is located at the Nasimi Park
- Interactive map of Nasimi Park
- Type: Public
- Location: Sumgait, Azerbaijan
- Coordinates: 40°35′42.9″N 49°40′44.8″E
- Area: 100 hectars
- Opened: 1968
- Administered by: Sumgayit city executive power

Nasimi Park (Azerbaijani: Nəsimi adına Mədəniyyət və İstirahət parkı) also known as Nasimi Cultural and Recreation Park is an 100-hectare park in Sumgait, Azerbaijan, named after the poet Imadeddin Nasimi. Opened in 1968, the park features a variety of tree species and recreational areas.

== History ==
Nasimi Park, established in 1968 by the directive of the Ministry of Culture of the Azerbaijan SSR, was designed to serve as a cultural and recreational space for the public. Initially covering 23 hectares, the park featured carefully planted trees such as Eldar and Alpine firs, silver maples, acacias, and poplars, chosen for their resilience to local climatic conditions. In 1978, the park was named in honor of the celebrated Azerbaijani poet Imadeddin Nasimi, emphasizing its cultural significance. That year, the "Peace Dove" monument, crafted by sculptors V. Nəzirov and A. Quliyev, was installed, further enriching the park's artistic landscape. By 1991, the park's eastern section became home to "Martyrs' Alley," a memorial space commemorating victims of significant historical events. Among its notable features are the January 20 tragedy monument and the "Stars" monument, unveiled in 1999, both serving as powerful reminders of national sacrifice and resilience. In 2001, the Cabinet of Ministers of Azerbaijan officially listed Nasimi Park as a national historical and cultural monument, recognizing its significance to the country's heritage. Starting in 2011, under the supervision of President Ilham Aliyev, the park underwent extensive reconstruction and expansion, growing to its current size of 100 hectares. Improvements included the construction of a coastal road, plans for the Green Theatre, and the addition of modern facilities to enhance visitor experiences. Efforts were made to preserve the tradition of planting rare and diverse tree species.

== Cultural events ==
Nəsimi Cultural and Recreation Park serves as a central venue for cultural and mass events during the spring and summer seasons. It hosts exhibitions featuring works by Azerbaijani artists and facilitates meetings with poets and writers. The park is also a key location for traditional events related to labor, literature, and arts days.

== Gallery ==
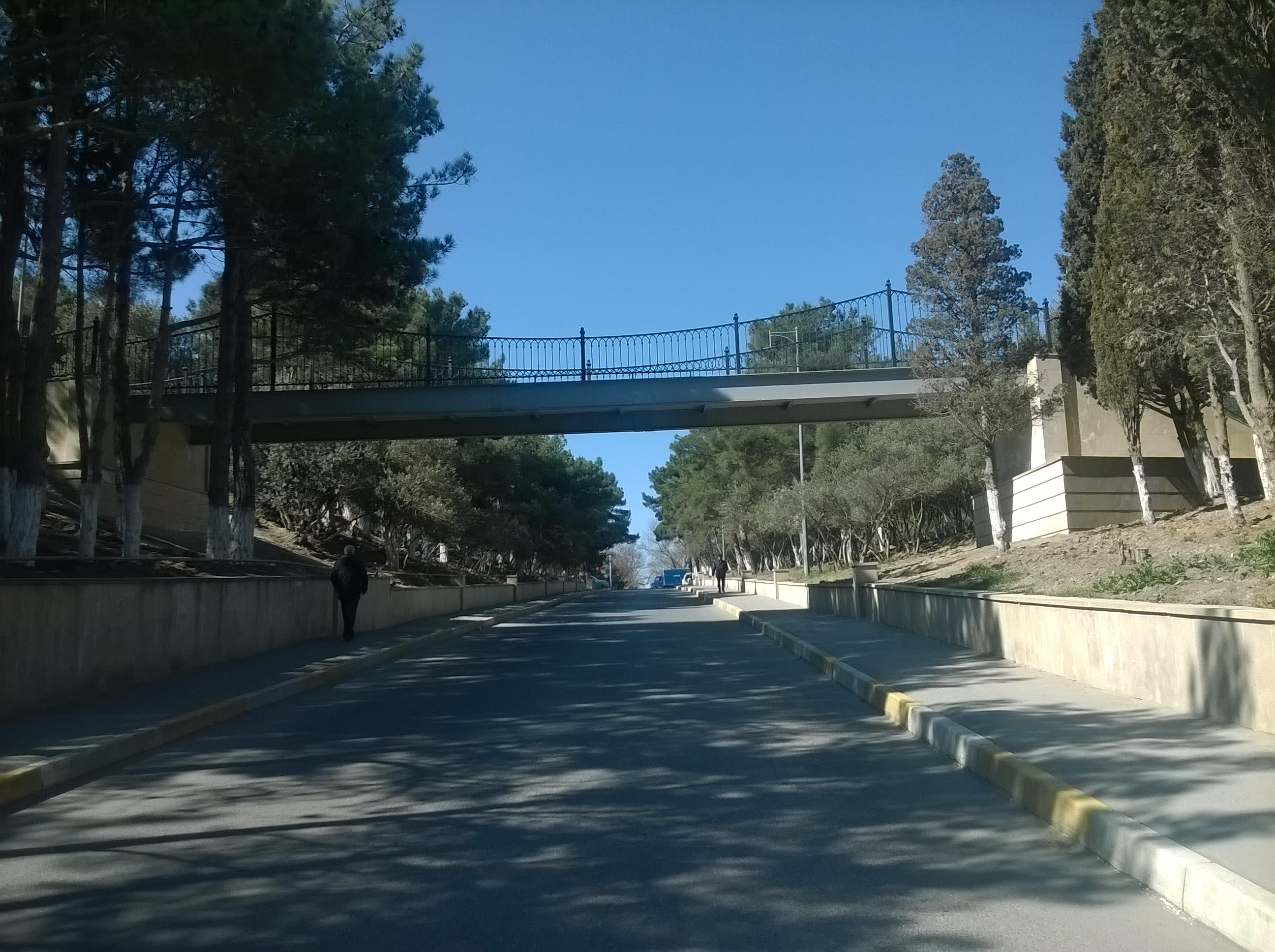

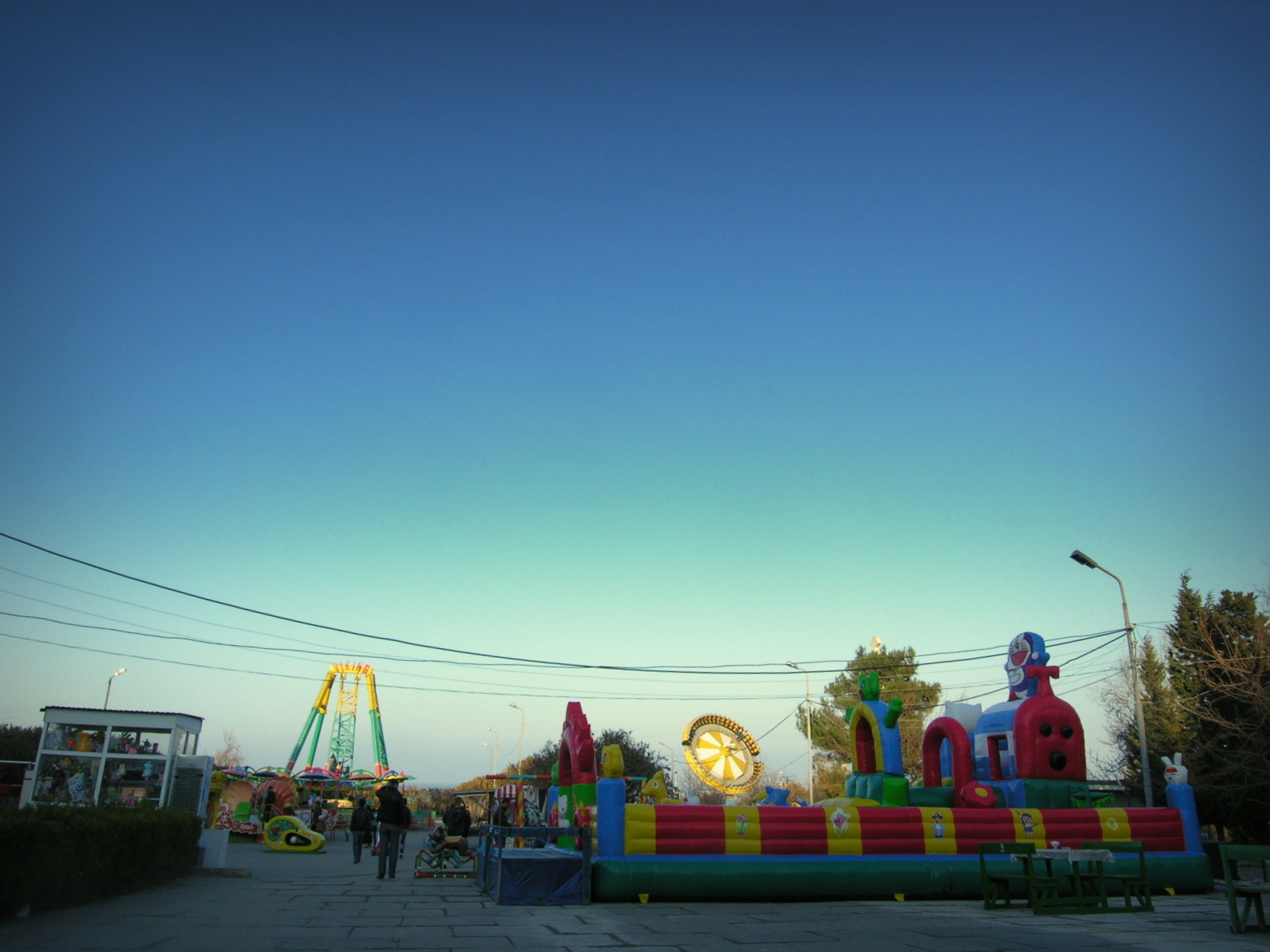

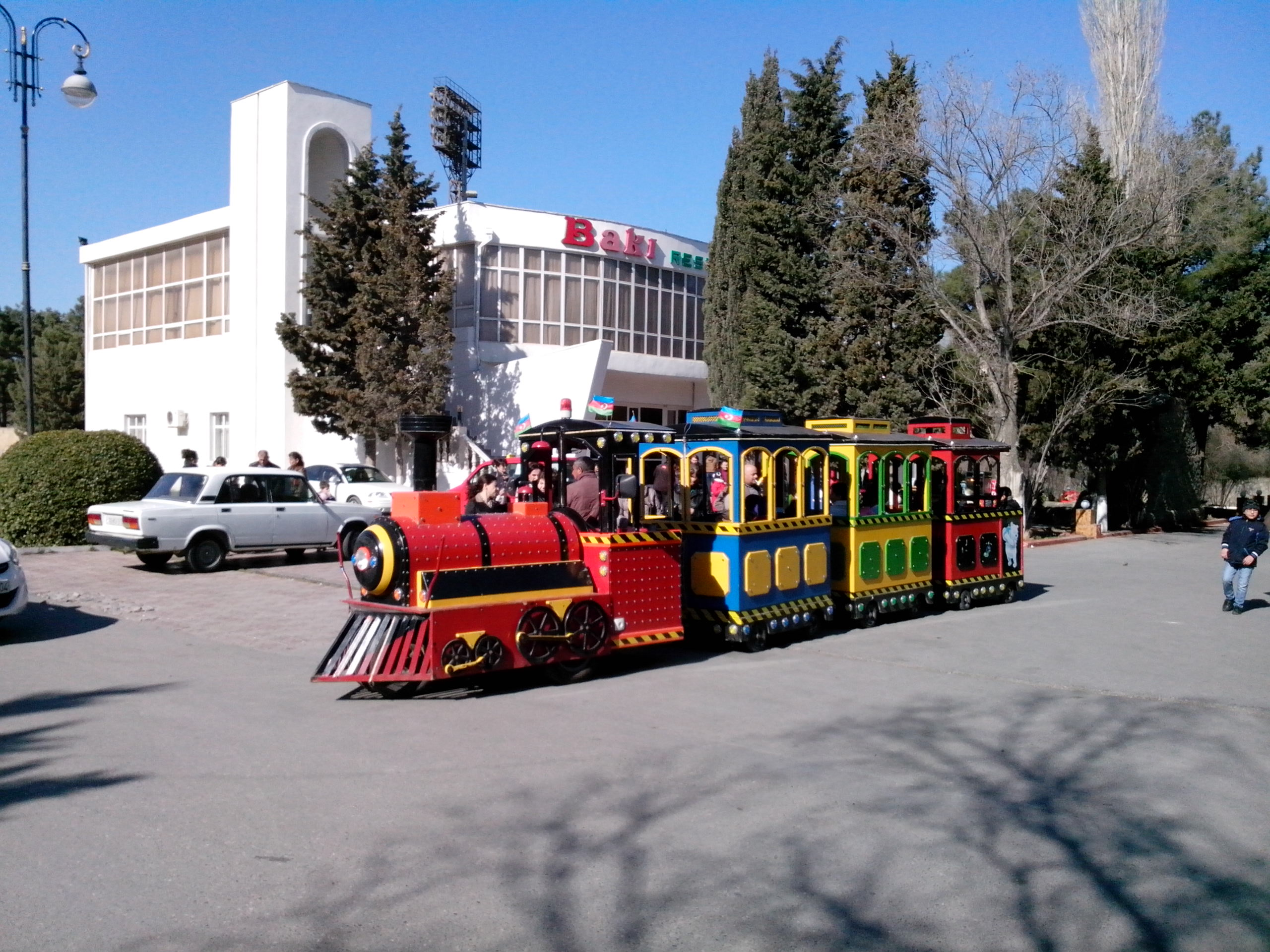
