= Peace Dove (Sumgait) =

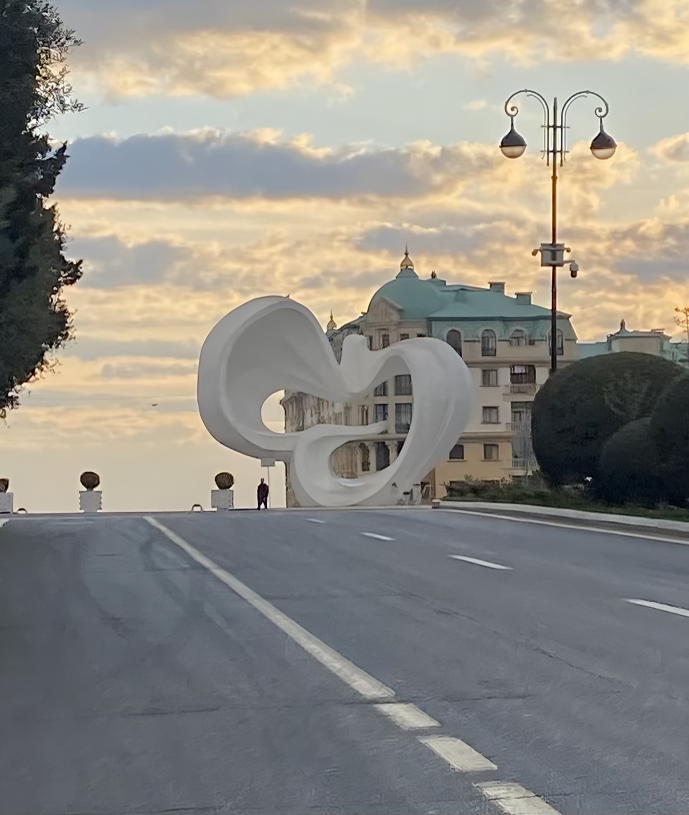
- 40.5915°N 49.6810°E
- Location: Sumgait, Azerbaijan
- Type: Sculpture
- Completion date: 1978

Peace Dove (Azerbaijani: Sülh göyərçini) is an allegorical sculpture located in Nasimi Culture and Recreational Park, Sumgait, Azerbaijan. Erected in 1978, it symbolizes peace and unity and is considered the city's emblem.

== History ==
Designed by monumentalist artist Vagif Nazirov and sculptor Asim Guliyev, the monument was created to celebrate the peaceful coexistence of the diverse population in Sumgait, an industrial city. Made of concrete, the sculpture stands at the intersection of Sulh Street and Samad Vurgun Street, with views of the city and the Caspian Sea.

The monument underwent renovations in 2008 and 2013 to maintain its condition and ensure its preservation.

== On stamps ==
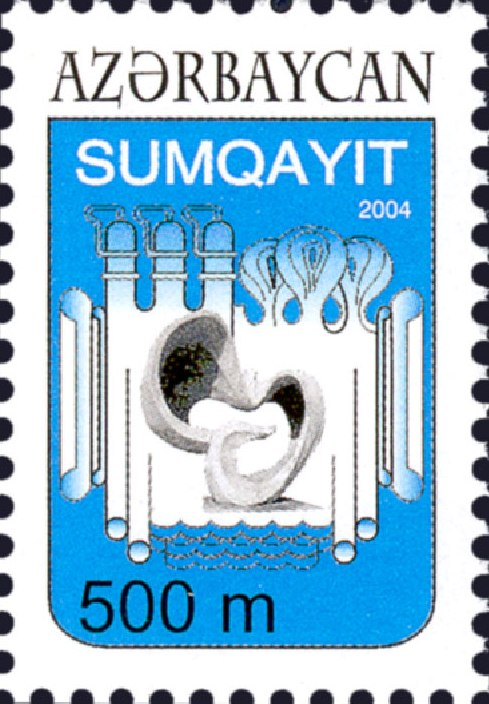
2004

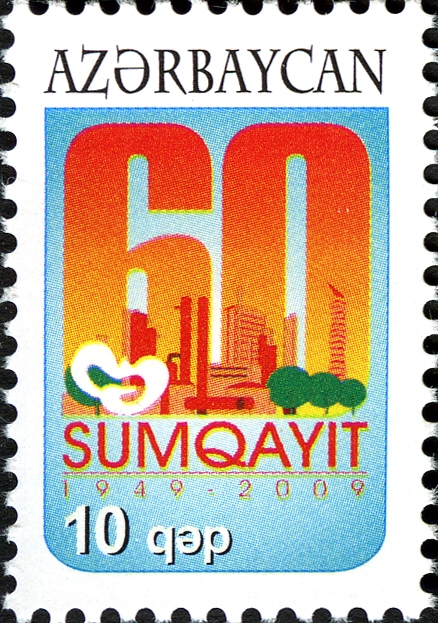
2009

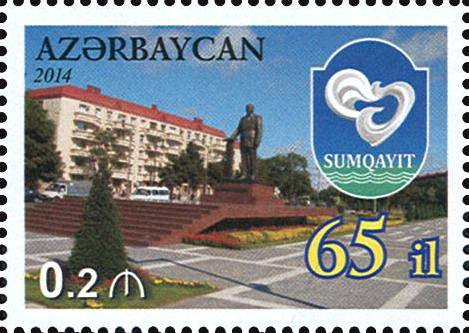
2014
