= Vusal Huseynov =

Azerbaijani public official (born 1980)

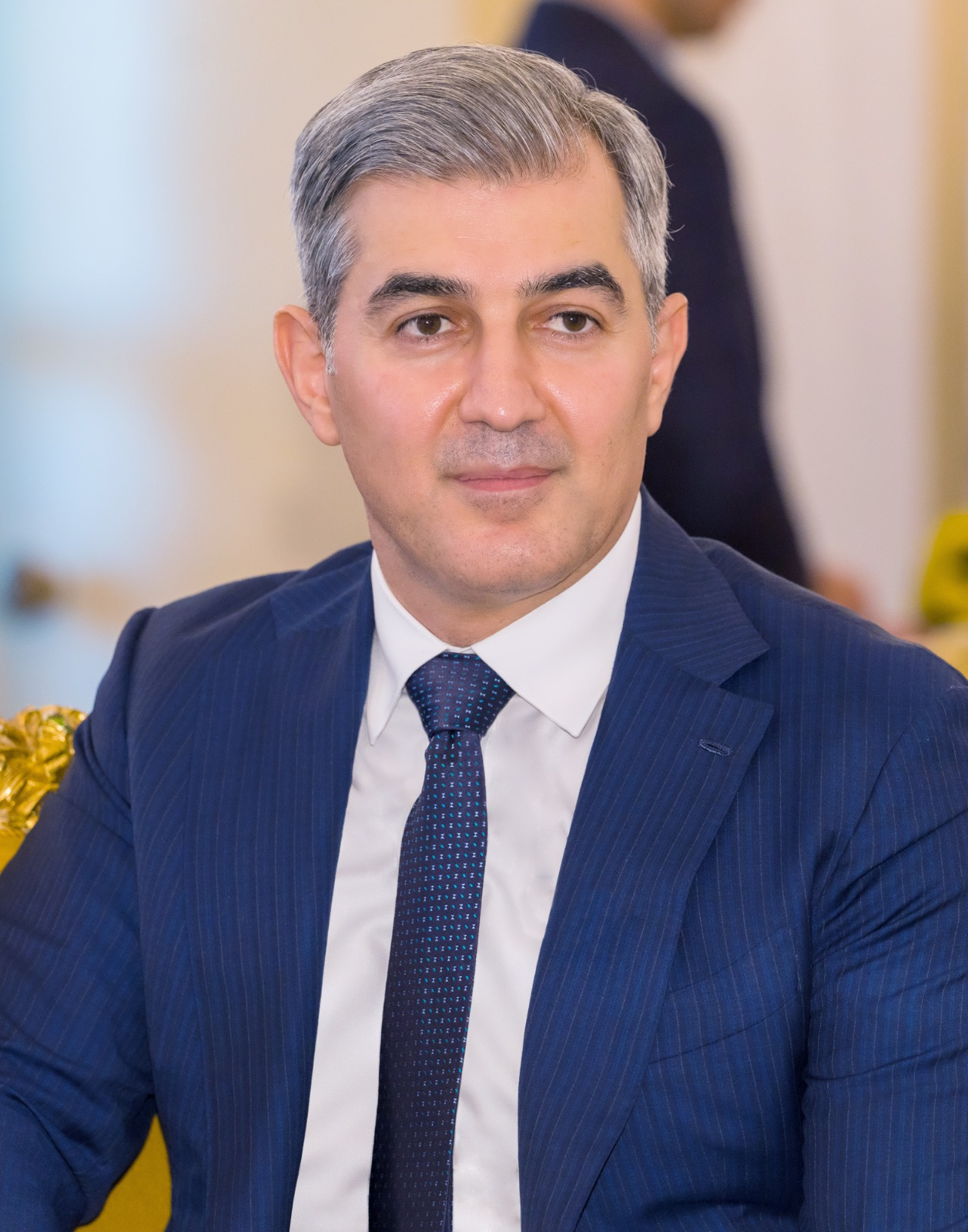

Chief of State Migration Service
- Incumbent
- Assumed office 23 April 2018
- President: Ilham Aliyev

Member of the National Assembly of Azerbaijan
- In office 1 November 2015 – 23 April 2018

Member of the Parliamentary Assembly of the Council of Europe
- In office 25 January 2016 – 24 June 2018

Personal details
- Born: 12 January 1980 (age 46)
- Party: New Azerbaijan Party
- Education: Harvard University; Baku State University; Azerbaijan State University of Economics
- Committees: Legal Policies and State Structuring Committee; Defence, Security and Combating Corruption Committee

Vusal Huseynov (born 12 January 1980) is an Azerbaijani public official who serves as the Chief of State Migration Service of Azerbaijan since 23 April 2018

== Early life and education ==
Vusal Huseynov was born on 12 January 1980 in Baku. In 1997 September, Vusal Huseynov entered Azerbaijan State University of Economics (UNEC), the Bachelor of Arts in Economics program. He obtained a bachelor's degree in June 2001. From September 2001 to June 2002, Vusal Huseynov participated in an extensive post graduate course on environmental policy focusing on environmental economics in Slovakia, Bratislava at Academia Istropolitana Nova. Two years after, he began his master's degree in Azerbaijan Economic Relations in September 2003, and in June 2005, he got his master's degree in International Economic Relations.

In 2007, he participated in the John Smith Fellowship program (6 weeks) focusing on leadership and governance as a John Smith Fellow in the United Kingdom, the cities of Edinburgh and London. In 2008, he was admitted to Baku State University, faculty of law and in 2012, graduated with full course in law diploma equal to LLM. In 2009, Vusal Huseynov became a participant of two special training programs. In July, he participated in the leadership training of the Central Eurosia Leadership Academy (CELA – www.celanetwork.org) in Turkey, Istanbul. Two months after, in September, he went to Germany for participation in the training in good governance and reform course organized by Passau University with a specialisation of the Economics of Corruption (http://www.icgg.org).

In June 2010, Vusal Huseynov was admitted to Master of Public Administration (MPA) of Harvard University, John F. Kennedy School of Government. He was granted the scholarship for his studies within the framework of “State Program on education abroad”. At the same time, he was winner of the Fulbright program for his studies at Harvard University. In May 2011, Vusal Huseynov graduated from Harvard University with a master's degree in Public Administration. Along with his studies in HKS, he also took part in a year long Mason Program and received a Mason Certificate on Public Policy.

== Career ==
=== Civil service career ===
In 2005, Vusal Huseynov joined as an advisor to the Secretariat of the newly established Anti-Corruption Commission of Azerbaijan Republic. At this post, he was also acting as Secretary of the inter-agency working group on improvement of legislation. He duties included liaising with government institutions involved in anti-corruption activities and the media, and coordinated relations with civil society institutions and international partners. He acted as an expert for the Council on State Support to NGO's under the President of the Republic of Azerbaijan to evaluate all grant applications covering the areas of governance and fight against corruption for the grant year of 2008-2010. His responsibilities also included evaluation and monitoring of reports within National Anti-Corruption Strategies. In 2011, with the post of senior advisor, he had a break in his civil service career due to education in the USA.

Vusal Huseynov served as advisor and later promoted to senior advisor post with the department of Law Enforcement Coordination of the Administration of the President between the years 2011-2013. In 2013, he was appointed Secretary of the Anti-corruption Commission of Azerbaijan. During these years, he also acted as a national focal point for CoE project on Good Governance and Fight against Corruption (Eastern Partnership) implemented in Azerbaijan. In 2015, due to his election to the Parliament of Azerbaijan he left civil service and started a career within the legislative body.

=== Teaching career ===
Vusal Huseynov started his teaching career in UNEC in 2006. He delivered lectures on the courses of International Economics and International Economic Institutions. In 2008, he also delivered lectures at Khazar University at the Law Department on the course of Introduction to Economics.

=== Parliament career ===
In the 5th Azerbaijan Parliamentary Election held on 1 November 2015, Vusal Huseynov was elected an MP from the Ujar constituency No 91 for the term of 2015-2020, representing the New Azerbaijan Party. He became a member of two committees in the National Assembly of Azerbaijan (Milli Majlis): Legal Policies and State Structuring Committee, and Defence, Security and Combating Corruption Committee. Additionally, he is a member of several working group on inter-parliamentary relations with Czech Republic, United States, Georgia etc. Since 14 April 2017, Vusal Huseynov chairs newly established working group on inter-parliamentary relations between Azerbaijan and Djibouti.

=== Center for Analysis of Ecenomic Reforms and Communication ===
Vusal Huseynov is a member of the Supervisory Board of the Center for Analysis of Economic Reforms and Communication since the establishment of the Center on 20 April 2016.

=== State Migration Service of the Republic of Azerbaijan ===
Vusal Huseynov was appointed as the Chief of State Migration of the Republic of Azerbaijan on 23 April 2018.

== International activities ==
=== Council of Europe ===
He is a deputy chair of the Delegation of Azerbaijan to the Council of Europe (CoE), and a member of the Group of the European People's Party in the CoE. Vusal Huseynov is a full member of the Committee on Legal Affairs and Human Rights, member of Sub-Committee on Crime Problems and the Fight against Terrorism, and Sub-Committee on Human Rights of the CoE. In 2018 he was elected as vice-chair of the Committee on Legal Affairs and Human Rights for renewable two-year term. On 7 March 2017, the Committee on Legal Affairs and Human Rights of the CoE appointed Vusal Huseynov rapporteur on “Strengthening international regulations against trade in goods used for torture and the death penalty.” On 26 January 2018, Vusal Huseynov presented his report to CoE Parliamentary Assembly, and it was unanimously adopted. He was also appointed as a Special Rapporteur on “Human rights and business – what follow-up to Committee of Ministers Recommendation CM/Rec(2016)3?”

=== International Anti-corruption Academy and GRECO ===
In December 2015, at the fourth session of the Assembly of Parties, Vusal Huseynov was elected a member of the Board of Governors of International Anti-corruption Academy for the term of 6 years (2015-2021). Since 2012, he has been heading the delegation of Azerbaijan to the Group of States against Corruption (GRECO) of the Council of Europe.

== Open Government Partnership ==
Vusal Huseynov served as the national focal point of the Open Government Partnership international initiative between the years of 2013-2016.

== Public activities ==
Vusal Huseynov joined the Association of Young Azerbaijani Friends of Europe youth NGO from early university years and served as vice president of the organization. Later, he co-founded and directed “Aegee-Baki” youth organization (NGO), national chapter of European Students Forum (AEGEE-Europe), for two years from its establishment. He has engaged himself into the development of ELSA-Azerbaijan national youth NGO activities. He acts as the transition board member of Azerbaijan Anti-Corruption Academy, public initiative aimed at increasing anti-corruption education and awareness.

== See also ==
- Cabinet of Azerbaijan
- The Commission on Combat Corruption of the Republic of Azerbaijan
- Kamal Jafarov
