= ASAN service =

Azerbaijani state agency

ASAN service (ASAN xidmət)
- Azerbaijani: ASAN xidmət
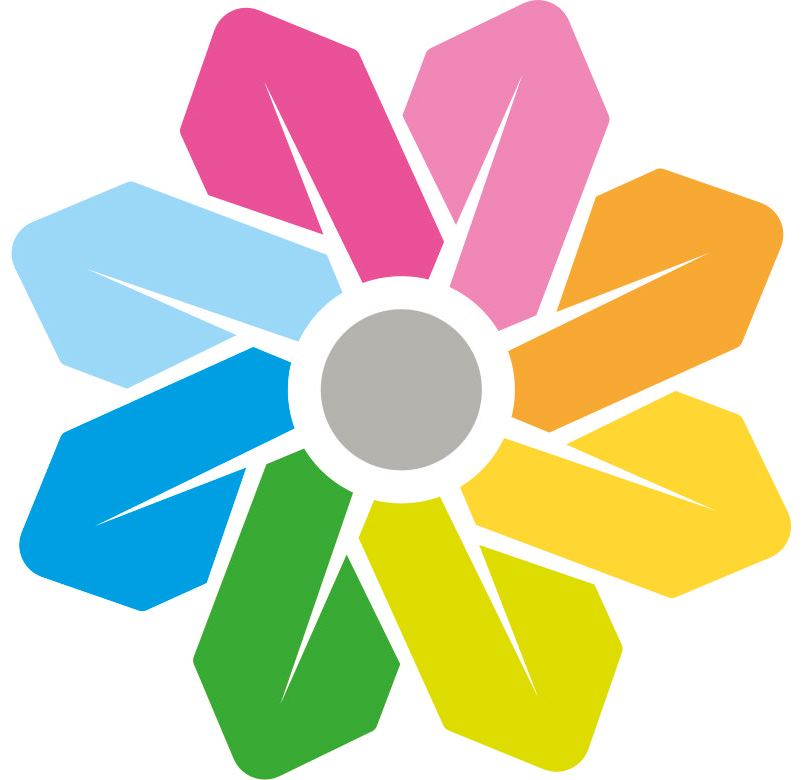
- ASAN xidmət

Agency overview
- Formed: 13 July 2012
- Headquarters: Baku, Ganja, Sumgait, Sabirabad, Barda, Masally, Qabala, Guba, Mingachevir, Imishli, Shaki
- Agency executive: Ulvi Mehdiyev, Chairman
- Website: asan.gov.az/%20asan.gov.az

The ASAN service (Azerbaijani: ASAN xidmət) is an Azerbaijani state agency for public services. The agency's goal is to make services more easily accessible to citizens using modern technologies. The acronym "ASAN" stands for "Azerbaijan Service and Assessment Network". The word "asan" means "easy" in Azerbaijani. Thus, the name literally means "easy service".

The ASAN service, as part of the State Agency for Public Services and Social Innovations under the President of the Republic of Azerbaijan, is chaired by Ulvi Mehdiyev.

ASAN service

== Statistics ==
Until today, applications of over 36 million citizens have been received. Mobile ASAN service began in 2013 and helps provide universal access for citizens. It uses buses that travel to deliver services in remote and hard-to-reach areas that do not have ASAN service centers. The agency also established intra-city mobile services in the capital city of Baku. By paying an additional fee, citizens can receive services at work, home or another location they choose. Public satisfaction rate is close to 100 percent.

Monitoring report by OECD in 2016 praised Azerbaijan "for advancing Azerbaijani Service and Assessment Network (ASAN) centres, which has contributed to eliminating the conditions that are conducive to corruption when delivering various administrative services to the public". Azerbaijan 2016 report by EEAS acknowledged ASAN services for eliminating corruption and removing bureaucracy in public service delivery.

As of October 2026, more than 600 centers have been established worldwide based on the Azerbaijani ASAN xidmət model, serving approximately 800 million people.

ASAN service

== Gallery ==
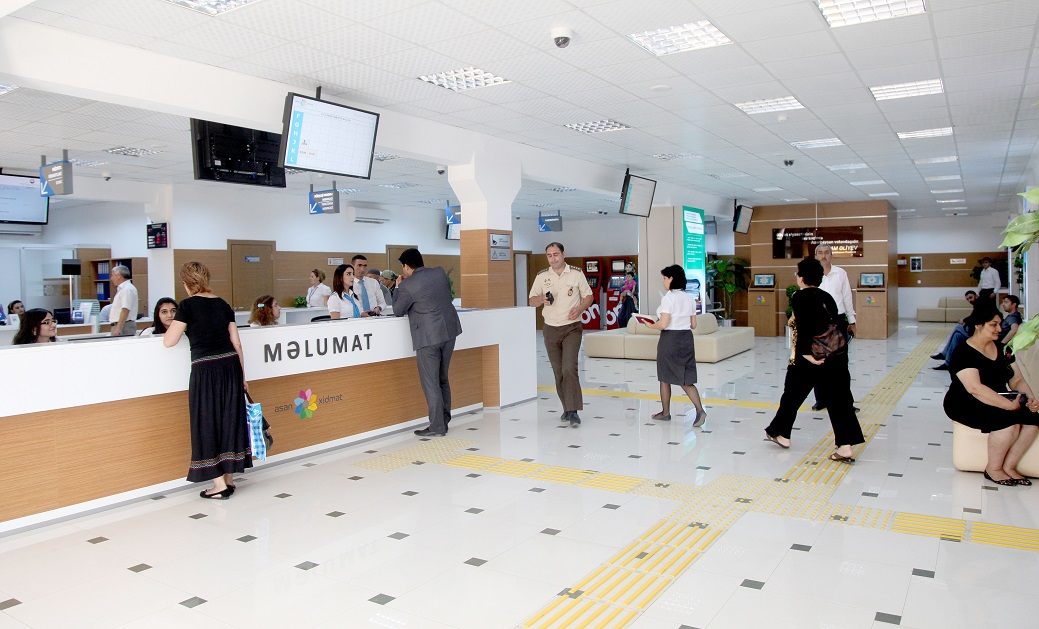
Sumgait ASAN service center

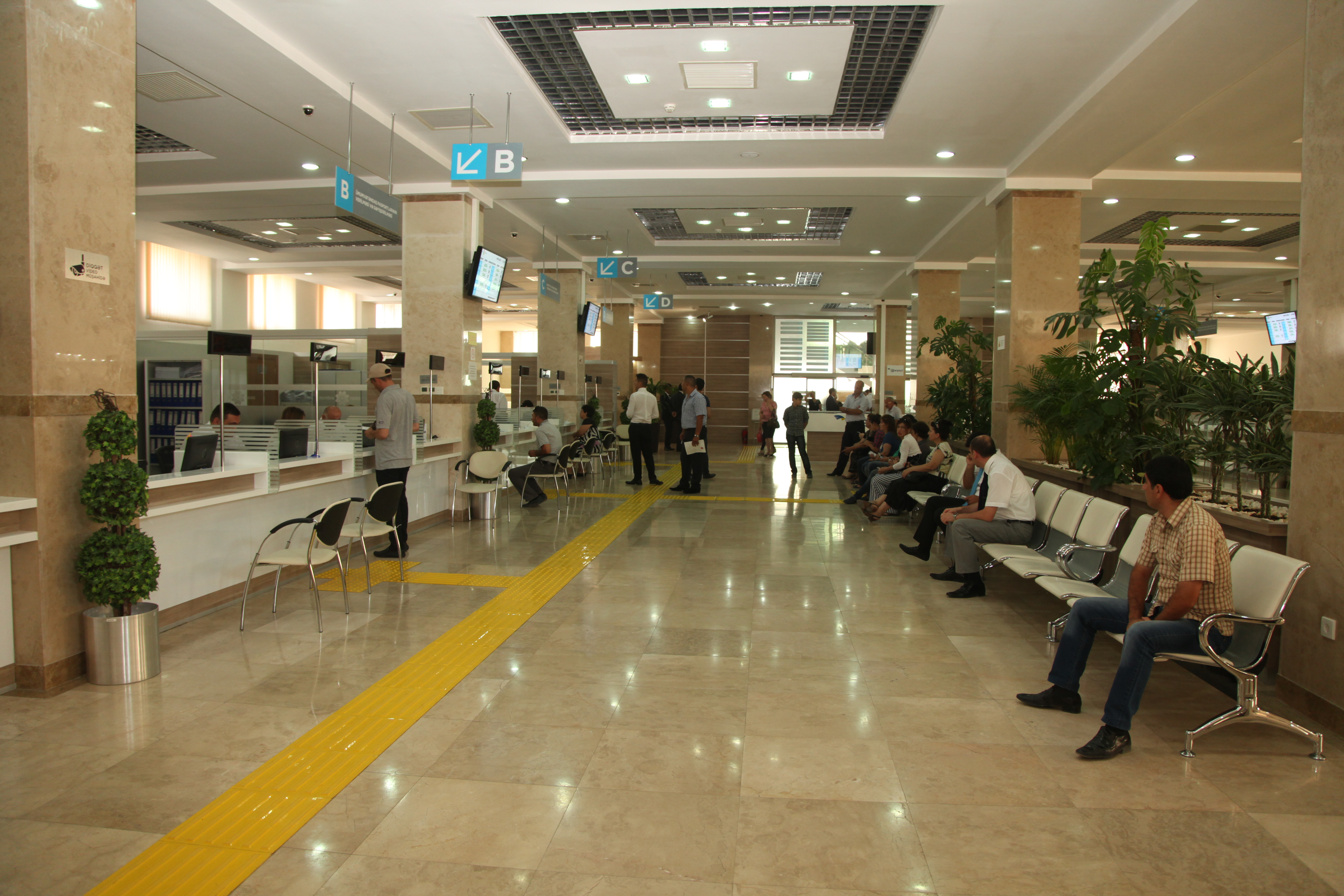
Baku ASAN service center No. 1

== See also ==
- ASAN Imza
- ASAN visa
- The Commission on Combat Corruption of the Republic of Azerbaijan
- Corruption in Azerbaijan
- Azerbaijan Anti-Corruption Academy
