= State Service for Mobilization and Conscription of Azerbaijan =

State Service for Mobilization and Conscription
- Səfərbərlik və Hərbi Xidmətə Çağırış üzrə Dövlət Xidməti

Agency overview
- Formed: 13 February 2012
- Jurisdiction: Government of Azerbaijan
- Headquarters: Baku, Azerbaijan
- Agency executive: Liteutenant-General, Arzu Yusif Rahimov
- Website: http://seferberlik.gov.az/

The State Service for Mobilization and Conscription of Azerbaijan (Azerbaijani: Səfərbərlik və Hərbi Xidmətə Çağırış üzrə Dövlət Xidməti) was created on February 13, 2012 by decree of Ilham Aliyev, President of the Republic of Azerbaijan. On implementation of the law on “Military job and military service”, the Military Commissariat of the Republic of Azerbaijan, Military Commissariat of Nakhchivan Autonomous Republic, and the military commissariats of regions and cities subordinated to Ministry of Defense of the Republic of Azerbaijan were abolished, and the State Service for Mobilization and Conscription of Azerbaijan was established.

It is led by Lieutenant General Arzu Yusif Rahimov, and the first deputy chief is Major General Zaur Abdullayev.

== Structure ==
The structure of the State Service for Mobilization and Conscription of Azerbaijan include the Office of the Service, local authorities, departments and divisions and other subordinate bodies such as legal entities, organizations, etc., as well as Mobilization and Military of Nakhchivan Autonomous Republic. The Service operates directly and through its agencies.

The military servicemen of the Armed Forces perform active military service in accordance with the laws of Azerbaijan "On military duties and military service" and the Statute "On military service", Statutes of the Armed Forces of Azerbaijan and other legislative acts for military personnel of the local Armed Forces, use the rights and privileges provided. Civil servant service of the Service is regulated by the Law of Azerbaijan "On Civil Service" and labor relations with civilian workers who are not civil servants, and are governed by relevant provisions of the Labor Code of the Republic of Azerbaijan.

== Activity directions ==
The State Service for Mobilization and Conscription of Azerbaijan calls for active military service, reserve service, mobilization preparation and mobilization, preparation for special military specialties, military training of special programs prepared by officers, peacekeepers of the Armed Forces of Azerbaijan and other armed forces, as well as armed forces and other armed formations during the mobilization and during the war, with special forces, military personnel and military vehicles, teamwork is a central executive body that exercises state policy and regulation in the field of citizens' complementation.

The Service is guided by the Constitution of Azerbaijan, international treaties to which the Azerbaijan join, laws of Azerbaijan, decrees and orders of the President of Azerbaijan, resolutions and orders of the Cabinet of Ministers of Azerbaijan, Statute of the Service and normative legal acts.
