= Ulvi Mehdiyev =

- Born: January 30, 1985 (age 41); Baku, Azerbaijan SSR
- Known for: Chairman of the State Agency for Public Service and Social Innovations under the President of the Republic of Azerbaijan

Ulvi Ramiz oglu Mehdiyev (Azerbaijani: Ülvi Ramiz oğlu Mehdiyev; January 30, 1985, Baku, Azerbaijan SSR, USSR) — Chairman of the State Agency for Public Service and Social Innovations under the President of the Republic of Azerbaijan.

== Early life ==
Ulvi Ramiz oglu Mehdiyev was born on January 30, 1985, in Baku. He graduated with the bachelor's and master's degrees from the law faculty of Baku State University., also received a master's degree in adaptive strategic management from Duke University in the United States. He served in the army in 2005–2006. He worked as a consultant and senior consultant in 2006–2009 at the head of The legislative department of the Ministry of Justice.

== Career ==
Ulvi Mehdiyev worked as a consultant in 2009–2012 in the law-enforcement affairs department of the Administration of the President of the Republic of Azerbaijan. Starting from 2012, he worked as the head of the sector in the law-enforcement affairs department of the Administration of the President of the Republic of Azerbaijan.

Ulvi Mehdiyev was appointed to the position of the Chairman of the State Agency for Public Service and Social Innovations under the President of the Republic of Azerbaijan by the order of the President of the Republic of Azerbaijan dated April 27, 2018. He speaks English and Russian.
