= State Migration Service (Azerbaijan) =

Government agency of Azerbaijan

State Migration Service of Azerbaijan Republic
- Azərbaycan Respublikasının Dövlət Miqrasiya Xidməti
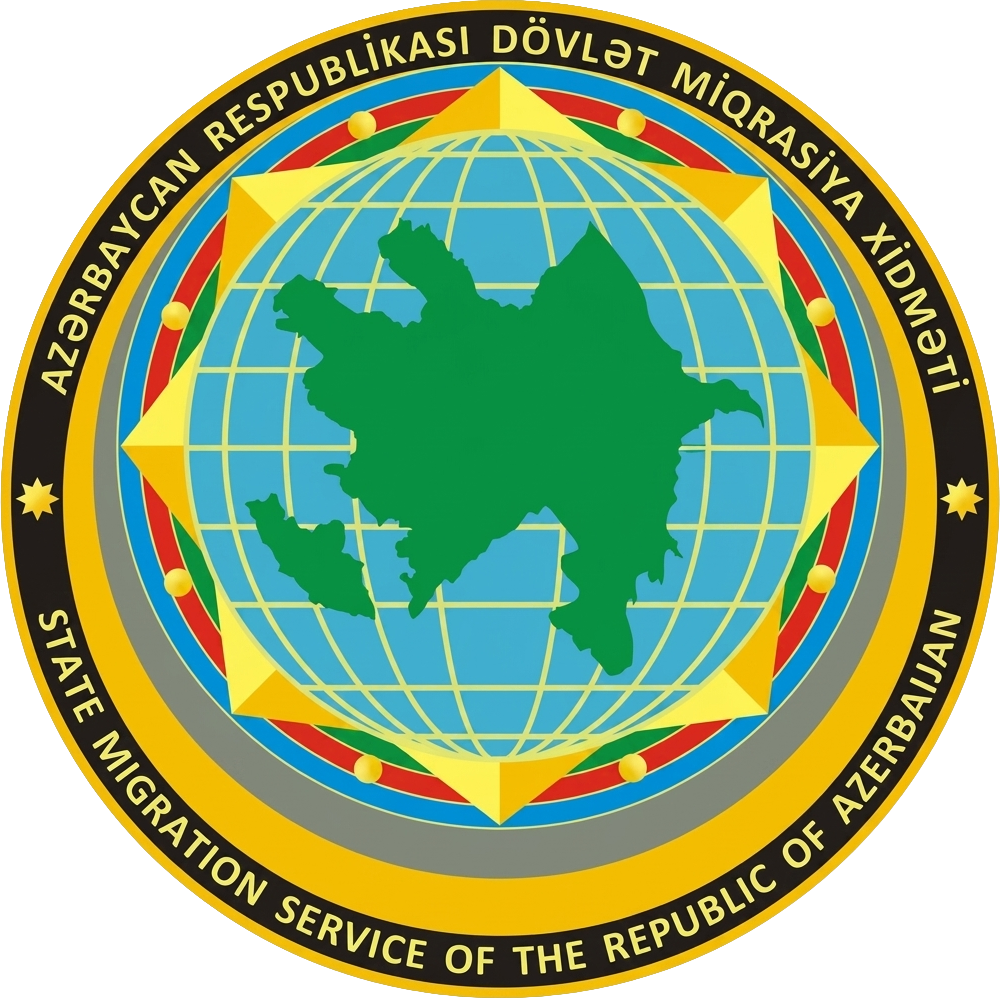
- Emblem of the State Migration Service

Agency overview
- Formed: March 19, 2007
- Headquarters: 202 Binagadi Highway, 3123th district, Binagadi, Baku, Azerbaijan Republic AZ1114
- Agency executive: Vusal Huseynov, Chief of the State Migration Service
- Website: www.migration.gov.az

The State Migration Service of Azerbaijan Republic (Azerbaijani: Azərbaycan Respublikasının Dövlət Miqrasiya Xidməti) is a governmental agency within the Cabinet of Azerbaijan in charge of regulation of activities the sphere of migration taking in consideration issues of national security and stable social-economic and demographic development in Azerbaijan Republic. The committee is headed by Vusal Huseynov.

== History ==
On July 25, 2006 Presidential Decree on “The State Migration Program of the Republic of Azerbaijan” for the period of two years adopted state policy on activities in the sphere of migration to better control national security, ensure economic and demographic development in the country, ensure rational use of workforce and to stop irregular migration processes. Pursuant to state policies and program on migration, the State Migration Service was established on March 19, 2007. Law enforcement agency status was given to State Migration Service according to the Presidential Decree dated 8 April 2009.

== Structure ==
The agency is headed by the Chief of the Service. The organization subdivided into Management, Apparatus and other departments. State Migration Service includes State Migration Service of the Nakhchivan Autonomous Republic, Regional Migration Departments, Illegal Migrants Detention Centers, Training Center and Medical institutions in its system.

Main functions of the service agency are enforcing state policies in the field of migration; developing a sophisticated migration management system, in order to forecast migration processes; preventing illegal immigration; engaging in international cooperation; organizing migration monitoring; granting or denying permissions on temporary and permanent residence to foreign citizens or people without citizenship; maintaining data about migration of Azerbaijani refugees, etc. The service also takes part in holding investigations, analysis and inspections of illegal immigrants in cooperation with Ministry of Internal Affairs, Ministry of National Security, Ministry of Labor and Social Protection of Population and State Border Service of Azerbaijan Republic.

=== Nakhchivan Autonomous Republic State Migration Service ===
State Migration Service of Nakhchivan Autonomous Republic was established in order to carry out state policy on migration, exercise the powers defined by the legislation on managing and regulating migration related processes in the territory of the Nakhchivan Autonomous Republic in May 2010. The Charter of State Migration Service of Nakhchivan Autonomous Republic was approved by the Ali Majlis of Nakhchivan Autonomous Republic on 31 May 2010.

State Migration Service of NAR follows the Constitutions and laws of the Republic of Azerbaijan and Nakhchivan Autonomous Republic, decrees and orders of the President of Azerbaijan and the Chairman of the Ali Majlis of NAR, resolutions and orders of the Cabinet of Ministers of the Azerbaijan and NAR, international agreements Azerbaijani Republic is party to, and the Charter of Migration Service of NAR in its activities.

== For foreigners ==
- In case visa is required, foreigners and stateless persons should obtain visa following the rules for visa application.
- Foreigners and stateless persons may arrive in Azerbaijan without visa, in accordance with relevant international agreements signed by the Government of Azerbaijan and relevant organization or country.
- The period of temporary staying in Azerbaijan under visa-free regime cannot be more than 90 days. If temporary staying period is not extended, foreigners and stateless persons should leave the territory of the Republic of Azerbaijan.
- Foreigners and stateless persons obtaining permit for temporary or permanent residence in the Republic of Azerbaijan may arrive in Azerbaijan and return to Azerbaijan without a visa by their passports or other border crossing documents.

== Single-Window System ==
The State Migration Service issues appropriate permits for foreigners and stateless persons coming to Azerbaijan to live and work on legal grounds, simplifying the procedure of their registration at the place of residence, and ensuring transparency in these processes. The “single window” principle has been applied on migration management processes starting from 1 July 2009 according to the Decree. Services like issuing temporary and permanent residence permits and providing appropriate documentations to foreigners and stateless persons, registration process and extension of stay of foreigners and stateless persons, issuing work permits to engage in paid labor activity in the territory of Azerbaijan are carried out within the framework of single-window system.

== Services ==
- Issuance (extension) of permit to foreigners and stateless persons for permanent residence in the territory of the Republic of Azerbaijan;
- Revocation of citizen of the Republic of Azerbaijan from citizenship of the Republic of Azerbaijan;
- Acquisition of the citizenship of Azerbaijan by foreigners and stateless persons;
- Restoration of foreigners and stateless persons to the citizenship of Azerbaijan;
- Issuance (extension) of a permit for temporary residence in the territory of Azerbaijan to foreigners and stateless persons;
- Extension of temporary staying period of foreigners and stateless persons in Azerbaijan;
- Giving refugee status to foreigners in Azerbaijan;
- Registration upon place of stay of foreigners and stateless persons arriving in Azerbaijan;
- Issuance (extension) of work permit to foreigners and stateless persons for engaging in paid labor activity on the territory of Azerbaijan;
- Establishment of person’s citizenship of Azerbaijan.

== International projects ==
Projects implemented by International Center on development of Migration Policy:

- Support to the Implementation of the Mobility Partnership with Azerbaijan (MOBILAZE);
- Pilot Project on Assistance for the Voluntary Return of Migrants from Azerbaijan;
- Strengthening the potential of migration and border control in Azerbaijan;
- Enhancing cooperation to effectively combat trafficking in persons through capacity building and technical assistance;
- Supporting the Establishment of Effective Readmission Management in the Southern Caucasus countries (2012–2015);
- Establishing Effective Mechanisms Safeguarding the Rights of Persons Involved in Migration in Azerbaijan" Project (2012–2013);
- Improving support for migrants and their family members staying outside of Azerbaijan" Project (2012–2013);
- Projects of TAIEX;
- Support the professional development of the staff of the State Migration Service of the Republic of Azerbaijan and its subordinated agencies, and adjustment of legislation on Migration to the EU standards.

== See also ==
- Cabinet of Azerbaijan
- Refugees and internally displaced persons in Azerbaijan
- Migration Policy of Azerbaijan
