= Orzu, Iran =

Orzu ارزو
- Village
- Location within Iran
- Coordinates: 31°29′33″N 50°02′04″E
- Country: Iran
- Province: Khuzestan
- County: Bagh-e Malek
- Bakhsh: Central
- Rural District: Haparu

Population (2006)
  - Total: 192
- Time zone: UTC+3:30 (IRST)
  - Summer (DST): UTC+4:30 (IRDT)

Orzu (Persian: ارزو, also Romanized as Orzū; also known as Ārenzū, Ārezū, and Ārzū) is a village in Haparu Rural District, in the Central District of Bagh-e Malek County, Khuzestan Province, Iran. At the 2006 census, its population was 192, in 34 families.
