= Shair Hasanov =

Azerbaijan socio-political figure

Shair Hasanov Şair Həsənov

Chairman of the Committee for Construction and Architecture of Azerbaijan Republic
- In office April 19, 2001 – February 28, 2006
- Preceded by: Abid Sharifov
- Succeeded by: Abbas Alasgarov (as the chairman of the State Committee for City Building and Architecture)

Chairman of the Committee on Housing and Communal Services under the Cabinet of Azerbaijan
- In office July 20, 1999 – April 19, 2001
- Preceded by: Sujaddin Abdullayev
- Succeeded by: office abolished

Minister of Construction Materials Industry of the Azerbaijan SSR
- In office December 12, 1990 – 1991
- Preceded by: Arif Mansurov
- Succeeded by: office abolished

Deputy Chairman of the State Agrarian Industry Committee of the Azerbaijan SSR
- In office 1986–1989

Minister of Rural Construction of the Azerbaijan SSR
- In office 1983 – December 12, 1985
- Preceded by: Dadash Asanov
- Succeeded by: office abolished

Personal details
- Born: July 10, 1936 Qusar, Qusar District, Azerbaijan SSR, TSFSR, USSR
- Died: March 15, 2017 (aged 80)
- Resting place: Baku, Azerbaijan
- Party: CPSU; New Azerbaijan Party
- Education: Azerbaijan Polytechnic Institute
- Awards: Order of the Red Banner of Labour Order of the Badge of Honour Honored Engineer of the Azerbaijan SSR

Shair Najmaddin oghlu Hasanov (Azerbaijani: Şair Nəcməddin oğlu Həsənov, July 10, 1936 — March 15, 2017) was an Azerbaijan civil engineer and socio-political figure, Chairman of the Committee for Construction and Architecture of Azerbaijan Republic (2001–2006), Chairman of the Committee on Housing and Communal Services under the Cabinet of Azerbaijan (1999–2001), Minister of Construction Materials Industry of the Azerbaijan SSR (1990–1991), Deputy Chairman of the State Agrarian Industry Committee of the Azerbaijan SSR (1986–1989), Minister of Rural Construction of the Azerbaijan SSR (1983–1985).

== Biography ==
Shair Hasanov was born on July 10, 1936, in the city of Qusar. In 1958, he graduated from the Azerbaijan Polytechnic Institute with a degree in road transport engineering. From that year, he worked in the system of the Ministry of Construction of the Azerbaijan SSR, engineer of research laboratory, senior engineer, head of department, chief engineer of construction organization and technology trust, deputy chief of technical department, chief engineer of "Reinforced concrete" trust of the Ministry of Industrial Construction, the head of the production department of the ministry.

Shair Hasanov was the First Deputy Minister of Rural Development of the Azerbaijan SSR in 1977–1980, Chief of the Main Department of Kolkhoz-Sovkhoz Construction ("Bashkolkhozsovkhoztikinti") in 1980–1983, Minister of Rural Construction in 1983–1985, until 1989 Deputy Chairman of the State Agrarian-Industrial (Agro-Industrial) Committee, from January to December 1990, Deputy Chairman of the "Azeravtoyol" Production Association. He was the Minister of Construction Materials Industry of the Azerbaijan SSR in 1990–1991, and the President of the "Azertikintimaterialsanaye" State Concern since May 1991.

Shair Hasanov served as chairman of the Committee on Housing and Communal Services under the Cabinet of Azerbaijan in 1999–2001, and in April 2001 was appointed chairman of the Committee for Construction and Architecture of Azerbaijan Republic. After the dissolution of the committee on 28 February 2006, Shair Hasanov retired. In 2006, he was elected chairman of the Board of the Lezgi National Center "Samur" and continued his public activities.

Shair Hasanov has been a member of the Communist Party of the Soviet Union since 1961, and of the New Azerbaijan Party since 1993, and was elected a deputy of the 10th-11th convocation of the Supreme Soviet of the Azerbaijan SSR. He was awarded the honorary title of "Honored Engineer of the Azerbaijan SSR" (1982), was awarded the "Order of the Badge of Honour" (1982), "Order of the Red Banner of Labour" (1986) and a jubilee medal. Since 2014, he has been a personal pensioner of the President of the Republic of Azerbaijan.

Shair Hasanov died in 2017 and was buried on March 15 in Baku.
