= Musa Mammadov =

Musa Mammadov Musa Məmmədov

Deputy Prime Minister of Azerbaijan
- In office January 2, 1992 – 2017

First Deputy Chairman of the Council of Ministers of the Azerbaijan SSR - Chairman of the State Agro-Industrial Committee of the Azerbaijan SSR
- In office December 13, 1985 – December 26, 1988
- Preceded by: Suleyman Tatliyev
- Succeeded by: Muzamil Abdullayev

Deputy Chairman of the Council of Ministers of the Azerbaijan SSR
- In office 1984 – December 13, 1985

Personal details
- Born: July 15, 1932 Qutqashen, Qutqashen District, Azerbaijan SSR, TSFSR, USSR
- Died: March 12, 2019 (aged 86) Baku, Azerbaijan
- Education: Azerbaijan Agricultural Institute
- Awards: State Prize of the Azerbaijan SSR Order of the October Revolution Order of the Red Banner of Labour Order of the Badge of Honour

Musa Salam oghlu Mammadov (Azerbaijani: Musa Salam oğlu Məmmədov, July 15, 1932 — March 12, 2019) was a Deputy of the Supreme Soviet of the Azerbaijan SSR (X-XII convocation), Deputy Prime Minister of Azerbaijan (1992-2017), State Counselor, Chairman of the Republican Forestry Production Union (1989-2001), Doctor of Economics, Candidate of Agricultural Sciences, Honored Agronomist.

== Biography ==
Musa Mammadov was born on July 15, 1932, in Qutqashen. He graduated from high school in 1948, and in 1952 from the agronomy faculty of the Azerbaijan Agricultural Institute with honors. Musa Mammadov, who entered the graduate school in the same year, defended his dissertation in 1956 and received the degree of Candidate of Sciences. He is the author of 40 scientific works, many monographs, several books and inventions related to the development of various fields of agriculture and forestry.

Musa Mammadov died on March 12, 2019, in Baku.

== Career ==
For a while he worked at the Azerbaijan Agricultural Institute as a teacher, director of educational and experimental farms. In 1964, he was appointed head of the department of the Ministry of Agriculture. From 1968 to 1970 he served as Deputy Chairman of the State Committee for Bakery and Mixed Feed Industry, and from 1970 to 1979 as Deputy Minister of Supply of the Republic. Later, he was promoted to the position of chairman of "Azerkendkimya" Scientific-Production Association. Musa Mammadov, worked as an acting chairman until 1984, was deputy chairman of the Council of Ministers of the Azerbaijan SSR for a year, first deputy chairman and chairman of the State Committee for Agrarian Industry in 1985-1989, chairman of the Republican Forestry Production Union in 1989-2001.

Musa Mammadov was also elected a member of the board of the USSR Ministry of Agriculture. In 1992, he was appointed Deputy Prime Minister of the Republic of Azerbaijan. Until his death, he worked as an adviser to the Minister of Agriculture.

== Awards ==
He was awarded the Order of the Red Banner of Labour, the Order of the October Revolution, the Order of the Badge of Honour twice and various medals. He was twice awarded the Honorary Decree of the Supreme Soviet of the Republic, two gold, two silver and bronze medals of the All-Union Exhibition of National Economic Achievements, and twice was awarded the Honorary Diplomas of the exhibition. Laureate of the State Prize for Science and Technology, awarded the title of Honored Agronomist of the Republic. He was awarded a personal scholarship by the President of the Republic of Azerbaijan for his invaluable services in improving the management of the agricultural sector in the country.
