= Ismat Abasov =

Azerbaijani politician (born 1954)

Ismat Abasov Ismət Abasov
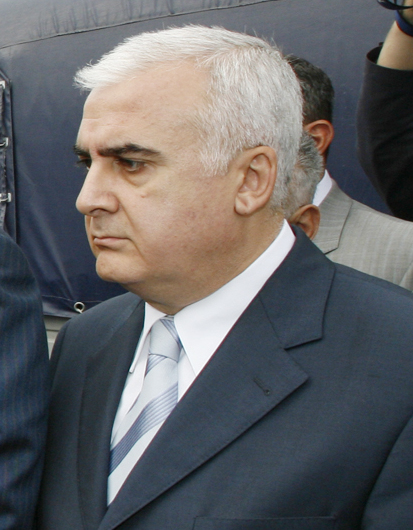

Minister of Food and Agriculture
- In office 23 October 2004 – 22 October 2013
- President: Ilham Aliyev
- Preceded by: Irshad Aliyev
- Succeeded by: Heydar Asadov

Deputy Prime Minister of Azerbaijan
- In office 22 October 2013 – 21 April 2018
- President: Ilham Aliyev
- Prime Minister: Artur Rasizade

Personal details
- Born: 25 May 1954 (age 72) Yerevan, Armenian SSR, USSR

Ismat Abasov Dursun oglu (born 25 May 1954) (Azerbaijani: Ismət Abasov Dursun oğlu) is an Azerbaijani politician who has served as Deputy Prime Minister of Azerbaijan from 2013-2018.

Previously Abasov was First Deputy Minister of Agriculture from October 1997 to October 2004 and Minister of Agriculture from October 2004 to October 2013.

== Early life and political career ==
Abasov was born and raised in Yerevan in the Armenian SSR, and is fluent in Armenian. He moved to Baku, Azerbaijan to study at the Azerbaijan State Economic University.

Abbasov was appointed as Minister of Agriculture in 2004 and re-appointed as minister on 31 October 2008 in a government reshuffle.

Abasov also served as President of the Table Tennis Federation of Azerbaijan from December 2004 to February 2014.

== Awards ==
- Shohrat Order (23 May 2014)
- For Service to the Fatherland Order (24 May 2024)

== See also ==
- Cabinet of Azerbaijan
- Politics of Azerbaijan
