= SSS Cultural Center =

DTX Mədəniyyət Mərkəzi
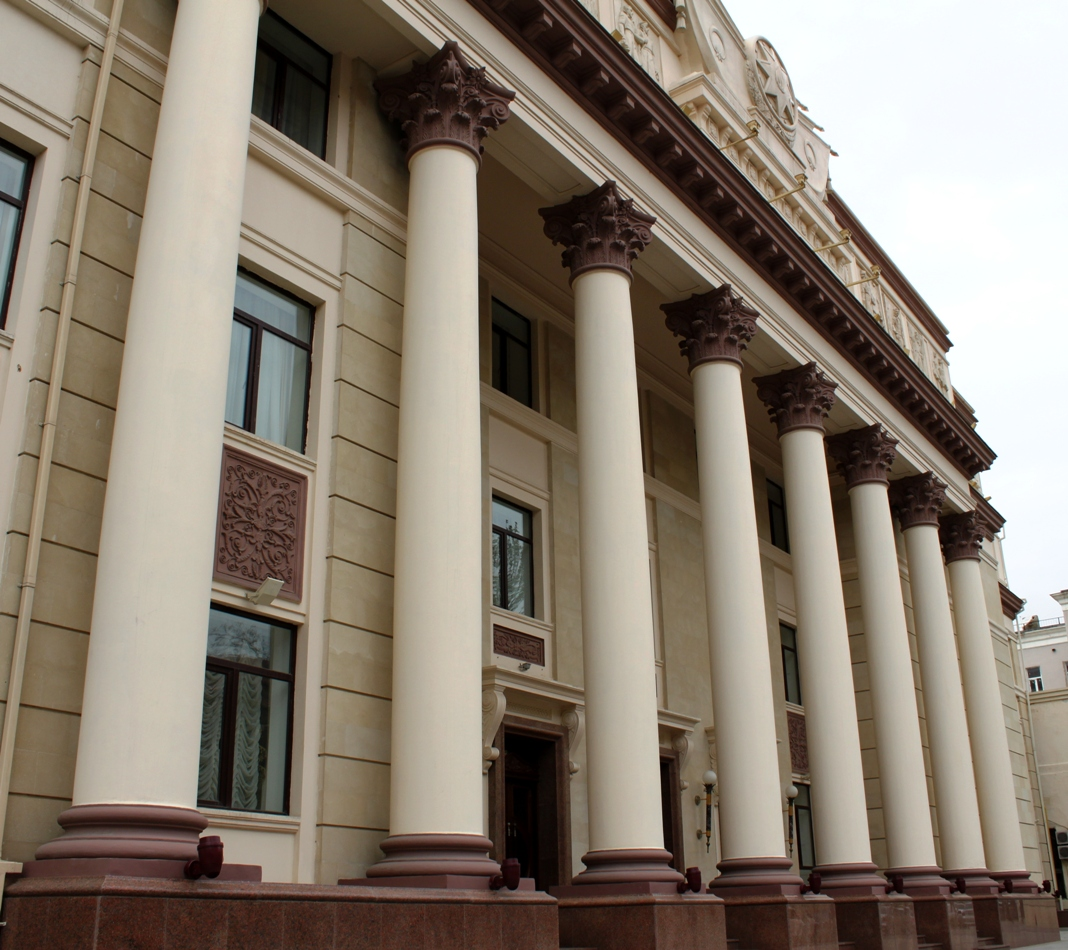
- Interactive map of the DTX Mədəniyyət Mərkəzi area

General information
- Architectural style: Stalinist architecture

DTX Cultural Center or SSS Cultural Center ( House of Culture of the State Security Service ), also known as the Cultural House of the State Security Service or the Shahriyar Cultural House (formerly the Dzerzhinsky Palace of Culture), is a cultural and artistic monument located in Baku, Azerbaijan, built in the Stalinist Empire architectural style. The building currently functions as the cultural center of the State Security Service.

== History ==
Constructed in 1949 based on the design of Hasan Majidov, the building is an example of 20th-century architecture and was built in the Stalinist style. Previously, the site housed the Church of the Blessed Virgin Mary, designed by Polish architect Józef Płoszko and built between 1909 and 1912. Known as the German Church, this religious structure was demolished in 1931. In the 1930s, a decision was made to establish a cultural club in Baku for state internal affairs and security bodies. Construction of a building later known as the “Dzerzhinsky Club” began in 1938–1939 but was left unfinished due to the outbreak of World War II. In 1947, construction was completed based on a project by the Azerbaijan State Design Institute.

Between 1951 and 1953, additional construction and finishing works were carried out under the leadership of Hasan Majidov. For many years, the building hosted various state-level events, including congresses and anniversary ceremonies of state security, internal affairs bodies, and border troops.

According to a decision of the Cabinet of Ministers of the Republic of Azerbaijan dated January 31, 2008, the building was transferred to the balance of the State Security Service. After major renovation and reconstruction works, the official reopening ceremony took place on March 14, 2009, with the participation of President Ilham Aliyev. The cultural center is equipped with modern sound and lighting systems and includes a 600-seat concert hall, a 100-seat small hall, a conference hall, and a 120-seat restaurant.
