= Abbas Alasgarov =

Azerbaijani engineer and politician (1937–2018)

Abbas Alasgarov Abbas Ələsgərov

Chairman of the State Committee for City Building and Architecture of Azerbaijan
- In office 4 April 2007 – 18 February 2018
- President: Ilham Aliyev
- Preceded by: office established
- Succeeded by: Samir Nuriyev

Personal details
- Born: December 13, 1937 Baku, Azerbaijan SSR, Soviet Union
- Died: February 18, 2018 (aged 80) Baku, Azerbaijan

Abbas Alasgarov Abbas oglu (Azerbaijani: Abbas Ələsgərov Abbas oğlu; 13 December 1937 – 18 February 2018) was an Azerbaijani engineer and politician who served as the Chairman of the State Committee for City Building and Architecture of Azerbaijan from 2007. Construction engineer by profession, Asgarov is the chairman of the Union of Azerbaijani Architects and one of the authors of the main plan of Baku.

== Early life ==
Asgarov was born in 1937 in Baku, Azerbaijan. He started his career in construction in 1960 when he was employed by the Ministry of Construction. He then worked at the Industrial Construction Ministry for several years.

While working as the Senior Engineer at Orgtekhstroy state company, he managed the design and construction of nine microdistricts of Baku, several microdistricts in Nakhchivan, Ganja, Sumgayit, Communal Air Conditionals Plant, Republican Palace, Gulustan Palace, Baku Deepwater Structures Plant, Kura River channels, Tree Refinery Factory in Alat, four apartment building construction companies in Baku, Nakhchivan, Ganja and Sumgayit, construction of two metal-concrete products plants in Baku, one in Sumgayit and two others in Ganja and Nakhchivan and one sand-stone refinery in Poylu, Agstafa.

From 1977 on, Asgarov held executive positions in Azərsənayelayihə Design Institute, Baku Main Construction Department and Baku State Design Institute. When he was the director of Baku State Design Institute, Asgarov managed the projects for construction of apartment buildings in Gunashli, Qanligol, Yeni Yasamal, Ahmadli, Sahil, Badamdar, Lokbatan, building of Chinese Embassy in Baku, dormitories of Azərneftyağ Plant, Baku Choreography School, highrise buildings on Matbuat Avenue, Seyidov, Plotnikov, Qutqashinli, Hagverdiyev streets, Azadliq Avenue of Baku, vacation home for the disabled in Sagan; designed the main plan of National Park, apartment buildings for the members of Azerbaijani Parliament, etc.

== Political career ==
On April 4, 2007 in accordance with the Presidential Decree No. 2081, Abbas Asgarov was appointed the Chairman of the State Committee for City Building and Architecture of Azerbaijan Republic which was created a year earlier. As the chair of the committee, Abbasov has laid out a new development plan of Baku for 2010-2030.

== Awards ==
Asgarov holds the titles of Merited Engineer of Azerbaijan, Merited Architect of Azerbaijan, and was awarded with Sharaf and Xalqlar Dostluğu (Friendship of People) orders.

== See also ==
- Cabinet of Azerbaijan
- Architecture in Baku
- Architecture of Azerbaijan
