= Rovshen Rzayev =

Azerbaijani politician (born 1962)

Rzayev Rovshan
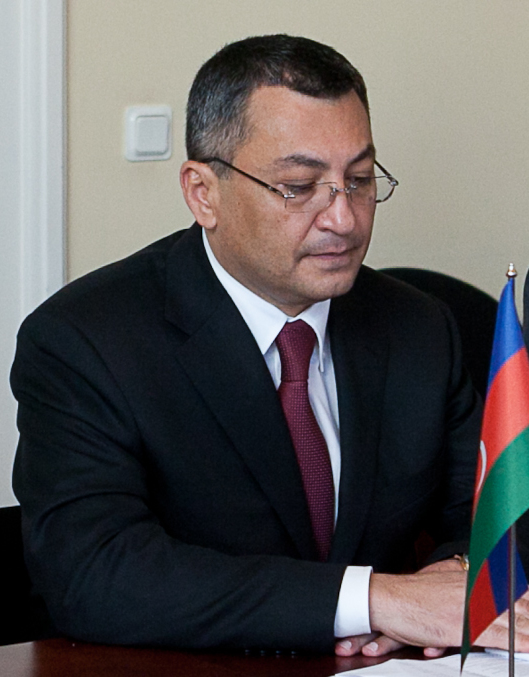

State Committee of Republic of Azerbaijan for Refugees and IDPs Chairman
- Incumbent
- Assumed office 21 April 2018
- Preceding: Ali S. Hasanov

Personal details
- Born: 20 January 1962
- Education: Baku State University
- Awards: Shohrat Order

Rzayev Rövşən Şükür oğlu (20 January 1962, Baku) — Chairman of the State Committee for Refugees and Displaced Persons of the Republic of Azerbaijan; Deputy of the 4th Meeting of the National Assembly of the Republic of Azerbaijan.

== Biography ==
He was born on 20 January 1962 in Baku. He graduated from the Faculty of History of Azerbaijan State University in 1986 and from the Faculty of Law of the same university in 1993.

Since 1982, he has served in various positions in the Ministry of Justice of the Republic of Azerbaijan. After being elected as a member of the National Assembly for the 101st constituency of Khanlar Dashkasan in 2004, he worked as deputy chairman of the Legal Policy and State Building Commission for a long time.

During his time as a member of the National Assembly of the Republic of Azerbaijan, he worked on the preparation of the Internal Regulations of this international organization as a member of the Azerbaijani delegation at the EuroNEST Parliamentary Assembly.

As a member of the Parliamentary Assembly of the Council of Europe, he worked in the "Migration, Refugees and Population" and "Social Issues" committees of this institution.

During his time as chairman of the working group on inter-parliamentary relations between Azerbaijan and Germany, he worked on increasing beneficial cooperation between these countries.

Public Union "Azerbaijani community of the Nagorno-Karabakh region of the Republic of Azerbaijan" was elected as a member of the Board of Directors of the Public Union on June 5, 2009.

According to the Decree of the President of the Republic of Azerbaijan dated 21 April 2018, he was appointed as the Chairman of the State Committee on Refugees and IDPs of the Republic of Azerbaijan.

He is the son of lawyer, statesman and Major General of Justice Shukur Rzayev.
