= Inam Karimov =

Azerbaijani politician

- İnam Kərimov

Chief Justice of the Supreme Court
- Incumbent
- Assumed office 4 April 2023
- President: Ilham Aliyev
- Preceded by: Ramiz Rzayev

Minister of Agriculture
- In office 21 April 2018 – 4 April 2023
- Preceded by: Heydar Asadov
- Succeeded by: Majnun Mammadov

Chairman of the State Agency for Public Service and Social Innovations under the President of Republic of Azerbaijan
- In office 7 September 2012 – 21 April 2018
- President: Ilham Aliyev
- Preceded by: Position established
- Succeeded by: Ulvi Mehdiyev

Personal details
- Born: 6 June 1977 (age 49) Baku, Azerbaijan SSR
- Education: Baku State University; University of Strasbourg; University of Paris

Inam Karimov (Azerbaijani: İnam Kərimov; born 6 June 1977) is the Chief Justice of Supreme Court of Azerbaijan, ex Minister of Agriculture of the Republic of Azerbaijan between 2018 - 2023. Between 2012 - 2018, he served as the Chairman of the State Agency for Public Service and Social Innovations under the President of the Republic of Azerbaijan (publicly known as ASAN Service)

== Biography ==
Inam Karimov was born in Baku on 6 June 1977.

=== Education ===
He studied at Humanitarian Subjects gymnasium between 1984 – 1994 years. He continued his education at Richmond High School in Indiana State of the USA between 1994 – 1995 years.

He entered the International Law faculty of the Baku State University. Inam Karimov achieved bachelor's degree at Strasbourg University in Law in 1998–2000 years, and master's degree in law in Sorbonne (Paris) University in 2000–2002 years.

He has received the degree of PhD in law from Paris University (Sorbonne).

=== Professional life ===
He worked as consultant in 2002 – 2004 years and as a head consultant in 2004 - 2012 at the Administration of the President of the Republic of Azerbaijan. He was Secretary of Commission on Combating Corruption of the Republic of Azerbaijan during 2005–2012.

He chaired the delegation of the Republic of Azerbaijan in Council of Europe's Group of States Against Corruption (GRECO) during 2005 – 2012 years.

He was appointed to the position of the Chairman of the State Agency for Public Service and Social Innovations under the President of the Republic of Azerbaijan by the order of the President of the Republic of Azerbaijan dated 7 September 2012.

When new Cabinet of Ministers of the Republic of Azerbaijan formed on 21 April 2018, he was appointed as the Minister of Agriculture by the President of Republic of Azerbaijan.

Inam Karimov has been appointed Chief Justice of the Supreme Court of Azerbaijan by the order of the President of the Republic of Azerbaijan dated 4 April 2023.

== Personal life ==
He speaks English, French, Russian and Persian languages.

Married, has two children.

== See also ==
- Cabinet of Azerbaijan
- ASAN Visa
- The Commission on Combat Corruption of the Republic of Azerbaijan
- Kamal Jafarov
