= Shakir Karimov =

Azerbaijani and former Soviet bureaucrat

- Şakir Kərimov

Chairman of the State Committee for Work with Internally Displaced Persons of the Republic of Azerbaijan
- In office 23 May 1991 – 21 December 1992
- Preceded by: Firuz Mustafayev
- Succeeded by: Irshad Aliyev

Minister of Motor Transport of the Azerbaijan SSR
- In office 3 April 1979 – 13 May 1986
- Preceded by: Mursal Babayev
- Succeeded by: Yuri Shedrin

Personal details
- Born: 1936
- Party: Communist Party of the Soviet Union
- Education: M. Azizbayov Azerbaijan Industrial Institute

Shakir Karim oghlu Karimov (Azerbaijani: Şakir Kərim oğlu Kərimov; born 1936) is an Azerbaijani and former Soviet bureaucrat, Minister of Motor Transport of the Azerbaijan SSR (1979–1986), Chairman of the State Committee for Work with Internally Displaced Persons of the Republic of Azerbaijan (1991–1992).

== Biography ==
Shakir Karimov was born in 1936. He graduated from the M. Azizbayov Azerbaijan Industrial Institute. In 1958, he worked as an oil production operator at the "Azizbayovneft" Fields Department. Until 1959 he worked in the Komsomol - instructor of the Baku City Komsomol Committee, first secretary of the Azizbayov District Komsomol Committee, head of the student youth department of the Central Committee of the Leninist Communist Youth Union of the Azerbaijan SSR, first secretary of the Baku Committee. From 1965 to 1969 he served in the state security agencies. In 1969-1971 he was the chief clerk of the Council of Ministers of the Azerbaijan SSR, the inspector of the department of organizational and party work of the Central Committee of the Communist Party of Azerbaijan. From 1971 he was the First Secretary of the Lenin District Party Committee, and from 1979 he was the Minister of Motor Transport of the Azerbaijan SSR.

Shakir Karimov was a member of the Inspection Commission of the Central Committee of the Communist Party of Azerbaijan and was elected a deputy of the Supreme Soviet of the Azerbaijan SSR (8th-11th convocation).
