= Naghiyev =

Naghiyev, Nagiev or Nagiyev (Azerbaijani: Nağıyev, Cyrillic: Нагиев) is an Azerbaijani masculine surname; its feminine counterpart is Naghiyeva, Nagieva or Nagiyeva. It may refer to the following notable people:

- Adil Naghiyev (born 1995), Azerbaijani football defender
- Ali Naghiyev (born 1958), Azerbaijani general
- Anatoly Nagiyev (1958–1981), Soviet serial killer
- Fuad Naghiyev (born 1975), Chairman of the State Tourism Agency of Azerbaijan
- Dmitri Naghiyev (born 1995), Azerbaijani-Ukrainian football player
- Dmitry Nagiyev (born 1967), Russian actor, TV-host, musician and showman
- Ilham Naghiyev (born 1988), Azerbaijani economist
- Musa Naghiyev (1849–1919), Azerbaijani industrial oil magnate
