= Gyshlag Mosque =

Former mosque in Shaki, Azerbaijan

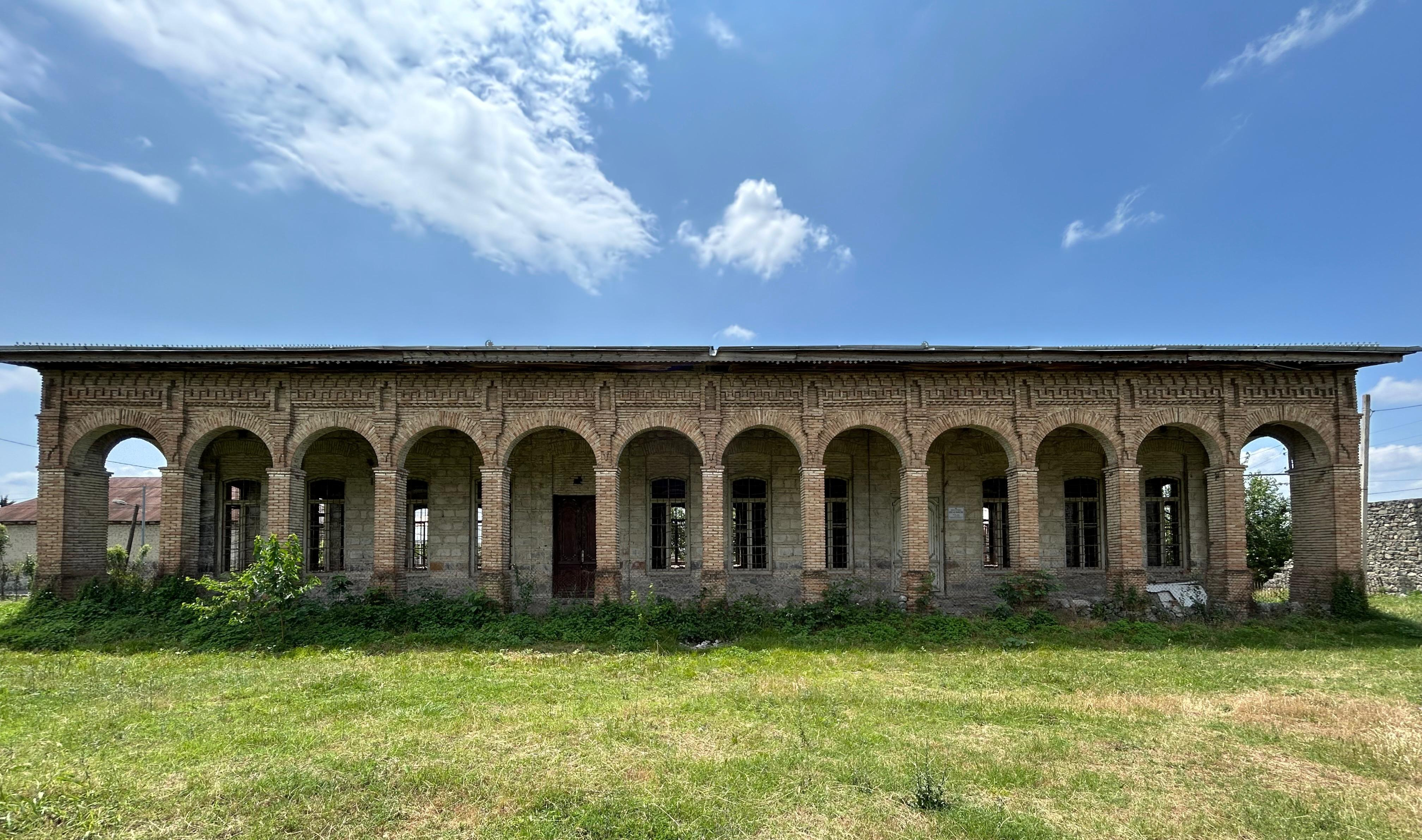
- Location: D. Bunyadzade Street
- Coordinates: 41°10′28″N 47°10′25″E
- Area: Shaki, Azerbaijan
- Built: XIX century

Gyshlag Mosque is a former mosque located in the city of Shaki, Azerbaijan.

The building was included in the list of immovable historical and cultural monuments of local significance by Decision No. 132 of the Cabinet of Azerbaijan dated August 2, 2001.

== About ==
Gyshlag Mosque was built in the 19th century in the Gyshlag neighborhood of Shaki city. River stone and brick were used in the construction of the mosque. The side and main entrance facades of the three-nave mosque were built with smooth river stone. The mosque's veranda has 12 arches.

After the Soviet occupation in Azerbaijan, an official campaign against religion began in 1928. In December of that year, the Central Committee of the Communist Party of Azerbaijan transferred many mosques, churches, and synagogues to the control of clubs for use in educational purposes. While there were 3,000 mosques in Azerbaijan in 1917, this number dropped to 1,700 in 1927, to 1,369 in 1928, and to just 17 by 1933. During this period, the Qishlaq Mosque was also closed for worship.

The mosque was included in the list of immovable historical and cultural monuments of local significance by Decision No. 132 of the Cabinet of Azerbaijan dated August 2, 2001.

Currently, the mosque building remains unused.

== Pictures ==
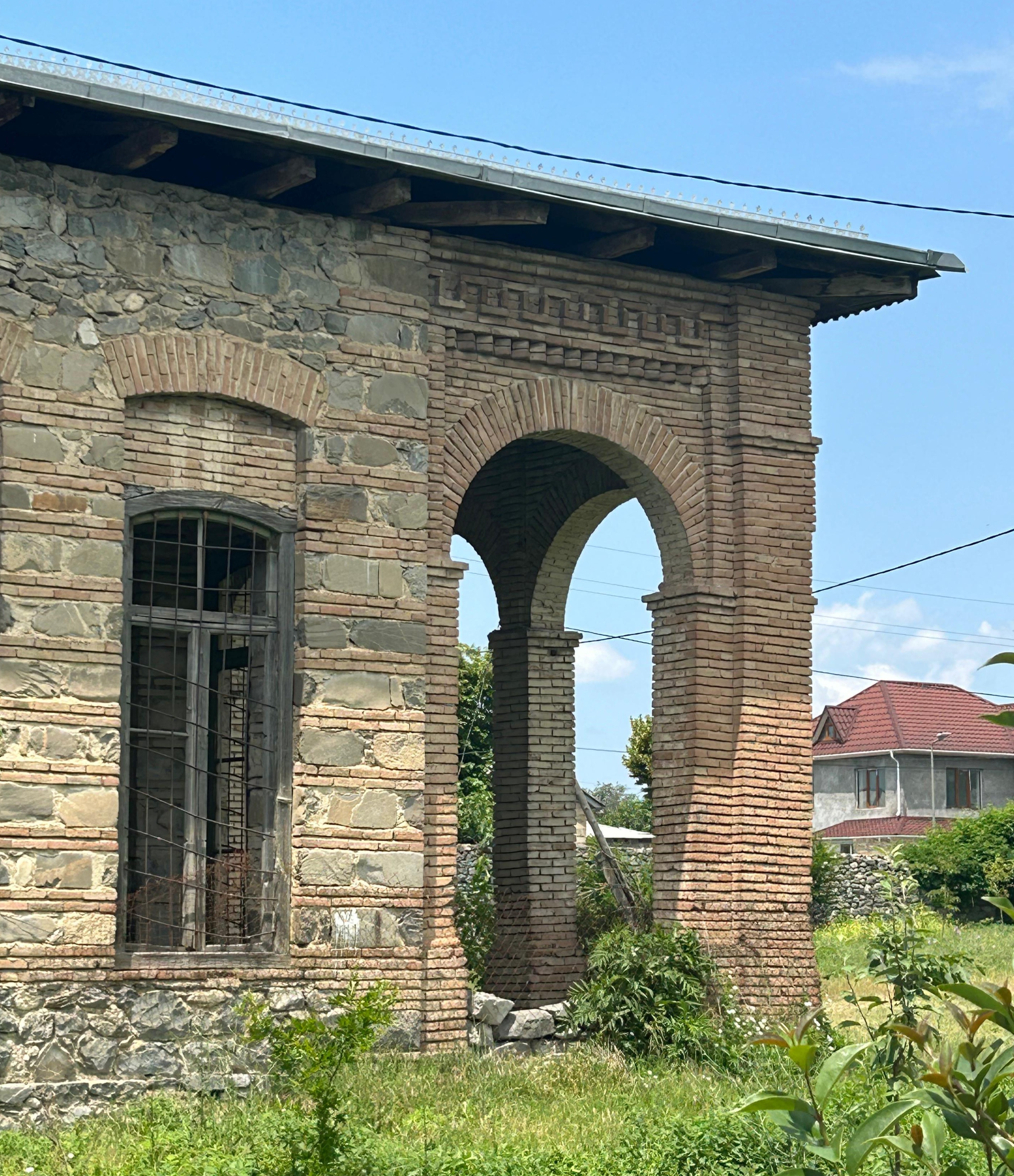

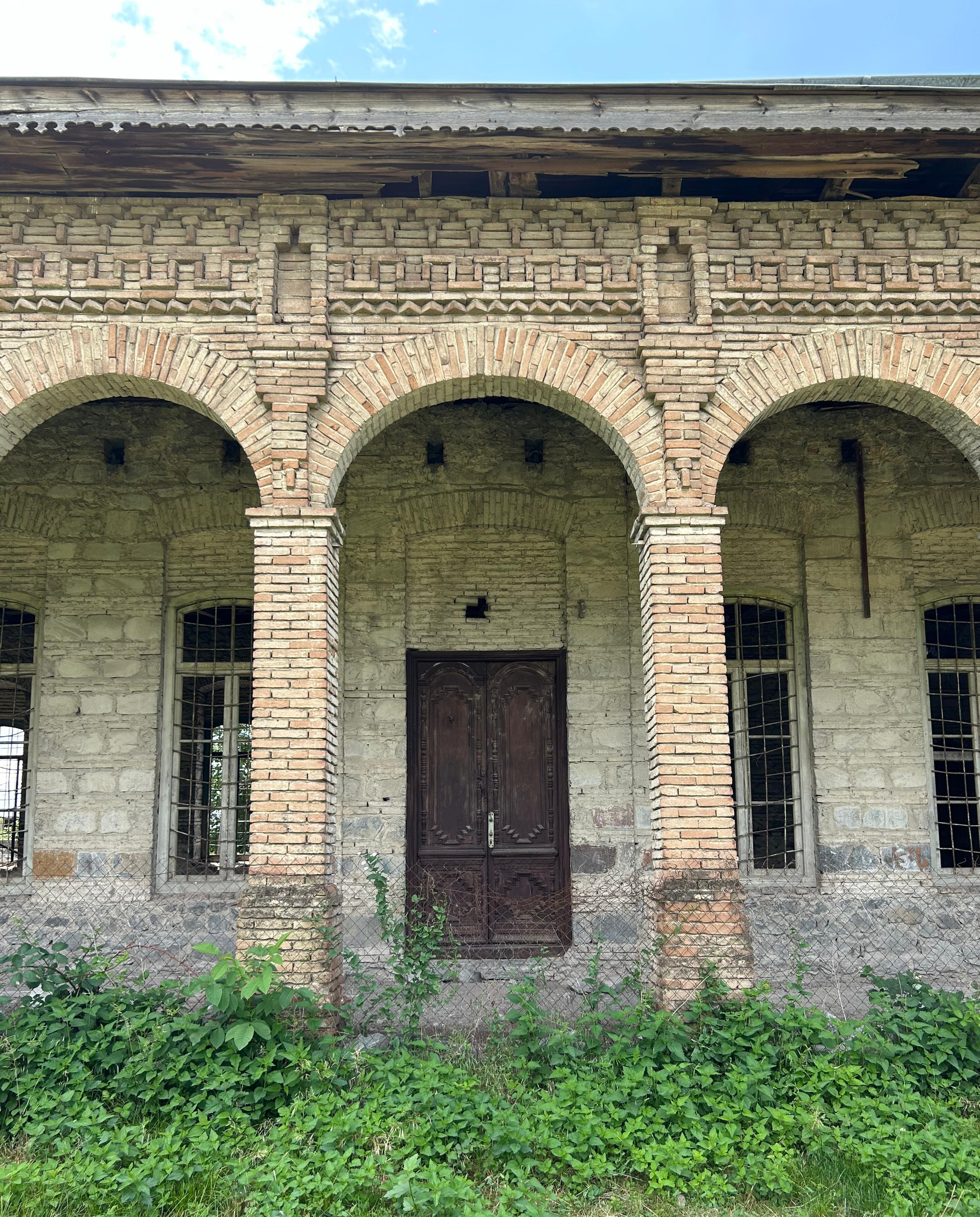

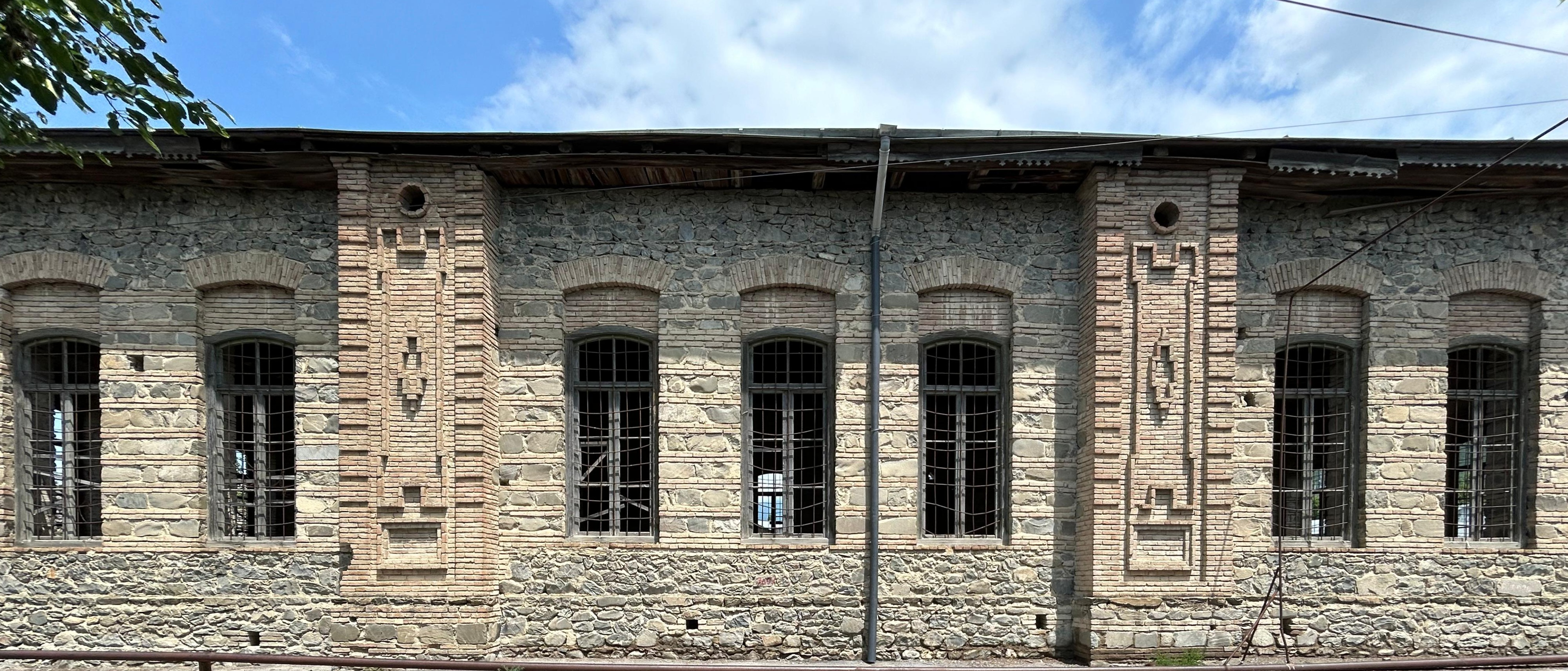

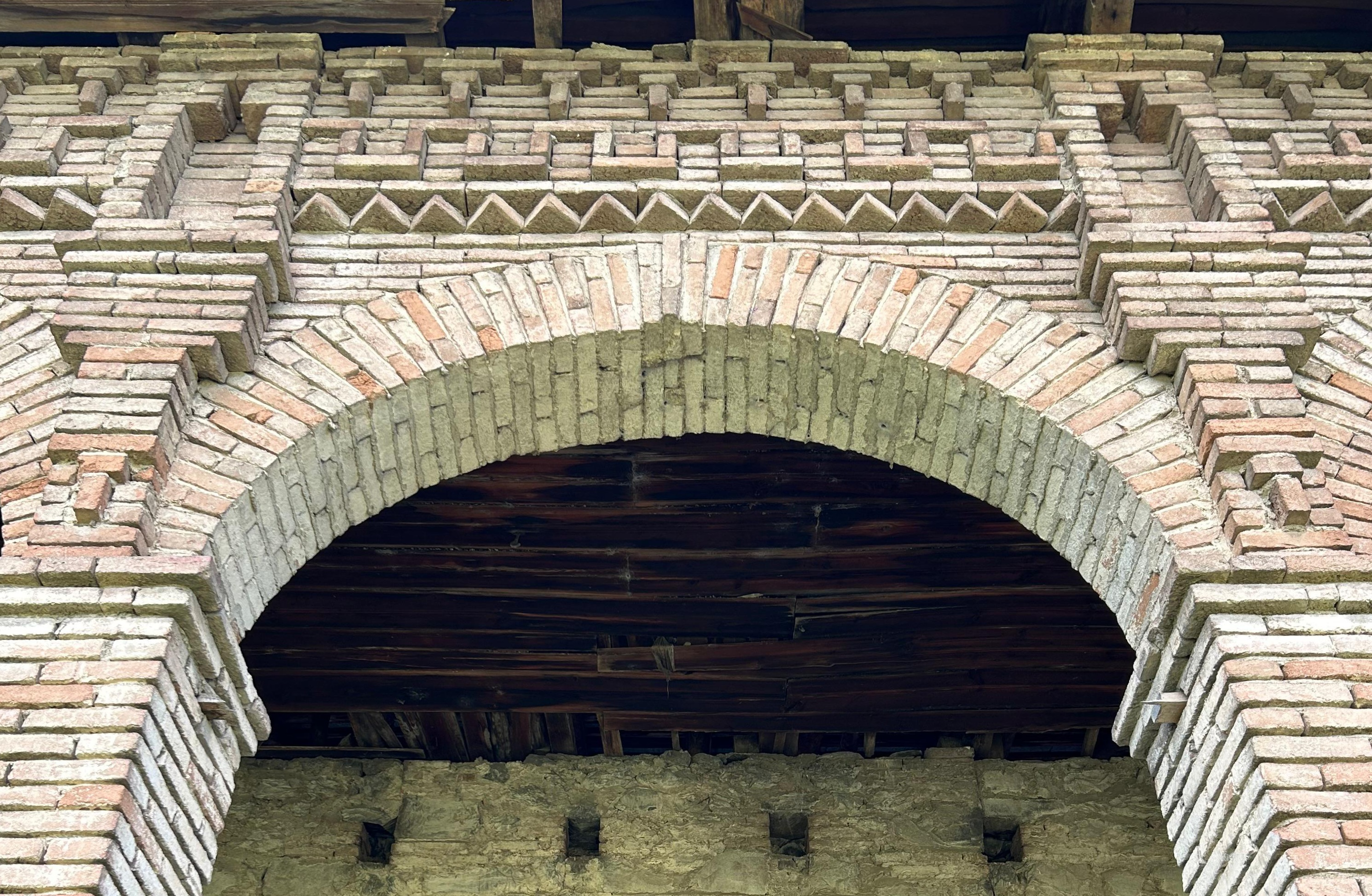

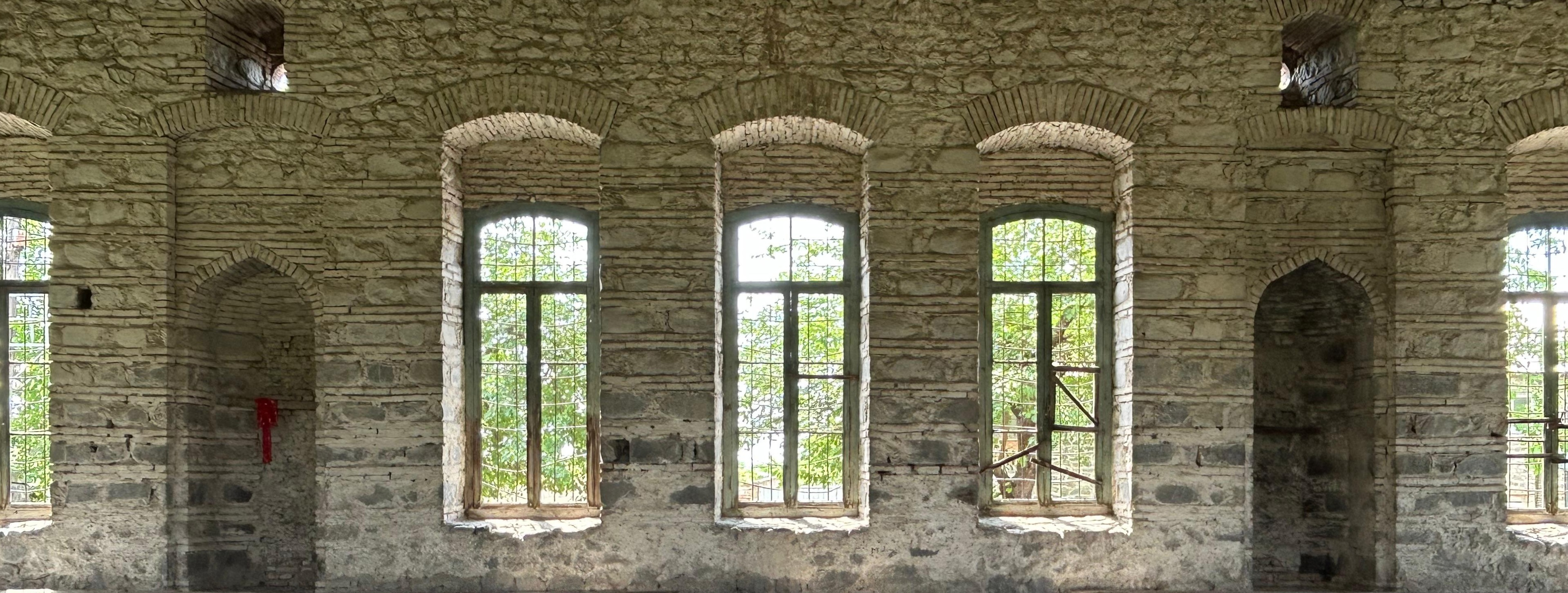

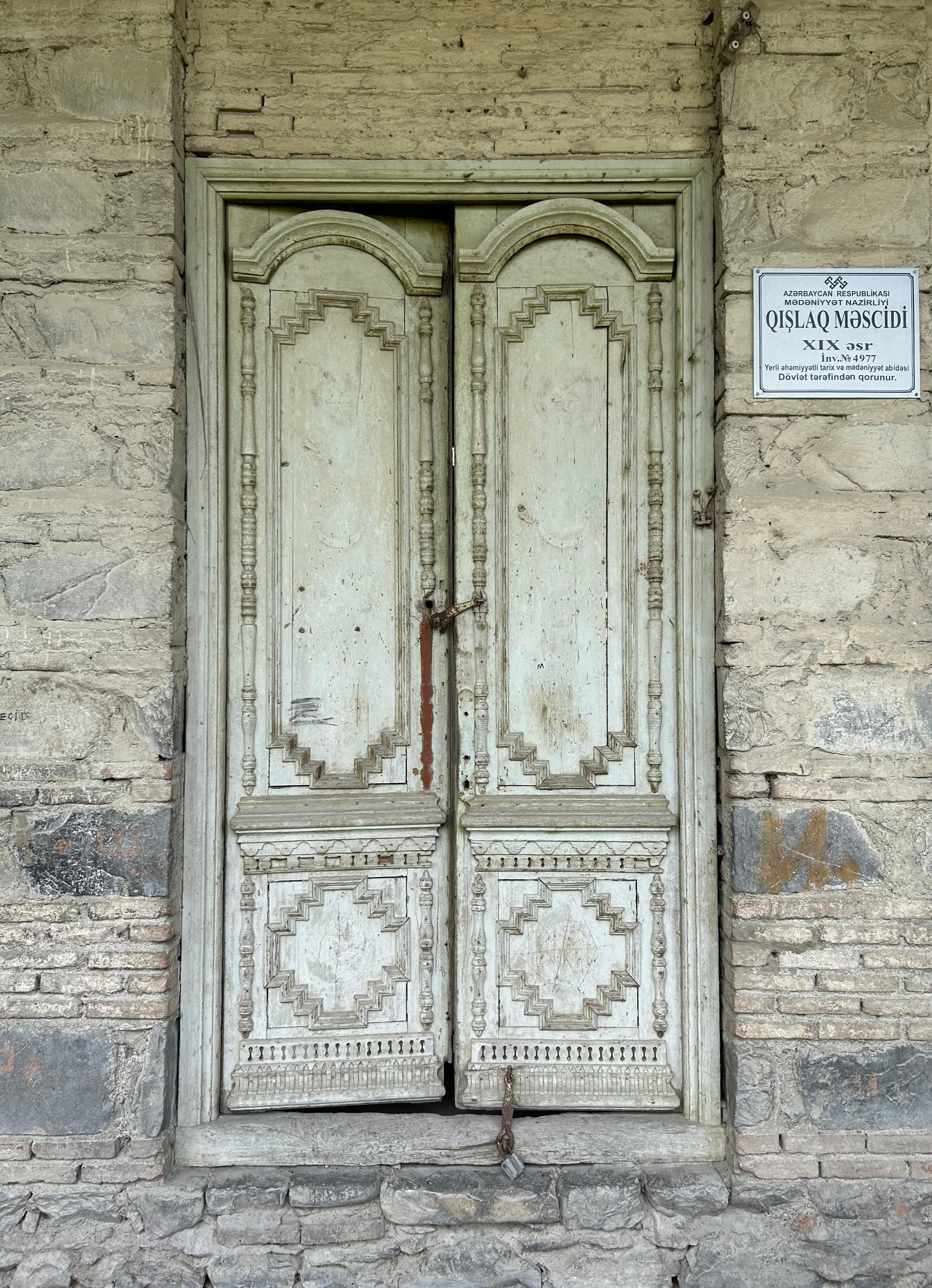

== Sources ==
=== Works cited ===
- Məmmədova, Gülçöhrə; Hacıyeva, Səbinə (2014). Azərbaycanın şimal-qərb regionunun memarlıq abidələri (in Azerbaijani). Bakı: Şərq-Qərb nəşriyyatı. p. 272.
