= Zargarpalan Bathhouse =

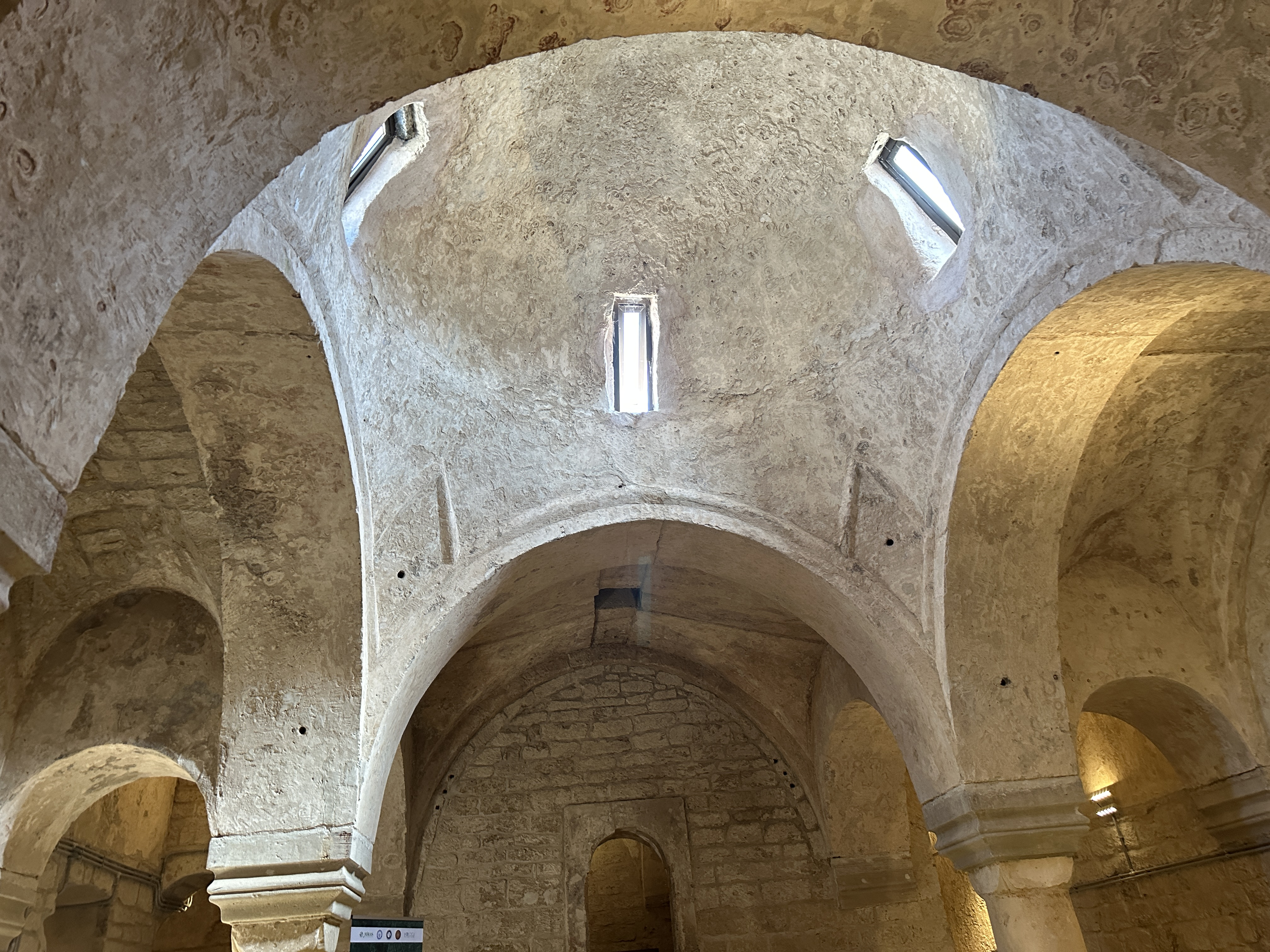
- Interactive map of Zargarpalan Bathhouse
- Type: Bathhouse
- Location: Hamidaga Huseynzade Street
- Area: Azerbaijan, Baku
- Built: 1899
- Architectural style: Shirvan-Absheron School of Architecture

Zargarpalan Bathhouse is a 19th-century historical and architectural monument located in Baku, Azerbaijan.

The bathhouse was included in the list of immovable historical and cultural monuments of local importance by the Resolution No. 132 of the Cabinet of Ministers of the Republic of Azerbaijan dated August 2, 2001.

== About ==
The Zargarpalan Bathhouse was built in 1899 by a local entrepreneur on Zargarpalan Street. During the Stalinist repressions in 1937, the owner of the bathhouse was persecuted, and the property was confiscated. The building’s function was changed — a blacksmith-coppersmith workshop and a mirror production shop operated in the former bathhouse. During this period, the interior of the monument was altered. Until 1995, the building continued to house a workshop, after which it was privatized.

The bathhouse was included in the list of immovable historical and cultural monuments of local importance by Resolution No. 132 of the Cabinet of Ministers of the Republic of Azerbaijan dated August 2, 2001.

Until 2024, the Zargarpalan Bathhouse remained unused. Starting from September of that year, archaeological excavations were carried out by the “Miras” Public Association for Support to the Study of Cultural Heritage. As a result of the excavations, the original entrance of the bathhouse, the remains of a fountain in the center of the hall, niches for placing items, and sewage lines were discovered.

After the completion of conservation works, on July 15, 2025, a presentation on the archaeological research conducted in the building was held, and the official reopening of the bathhouse took place.

== Pictures ==
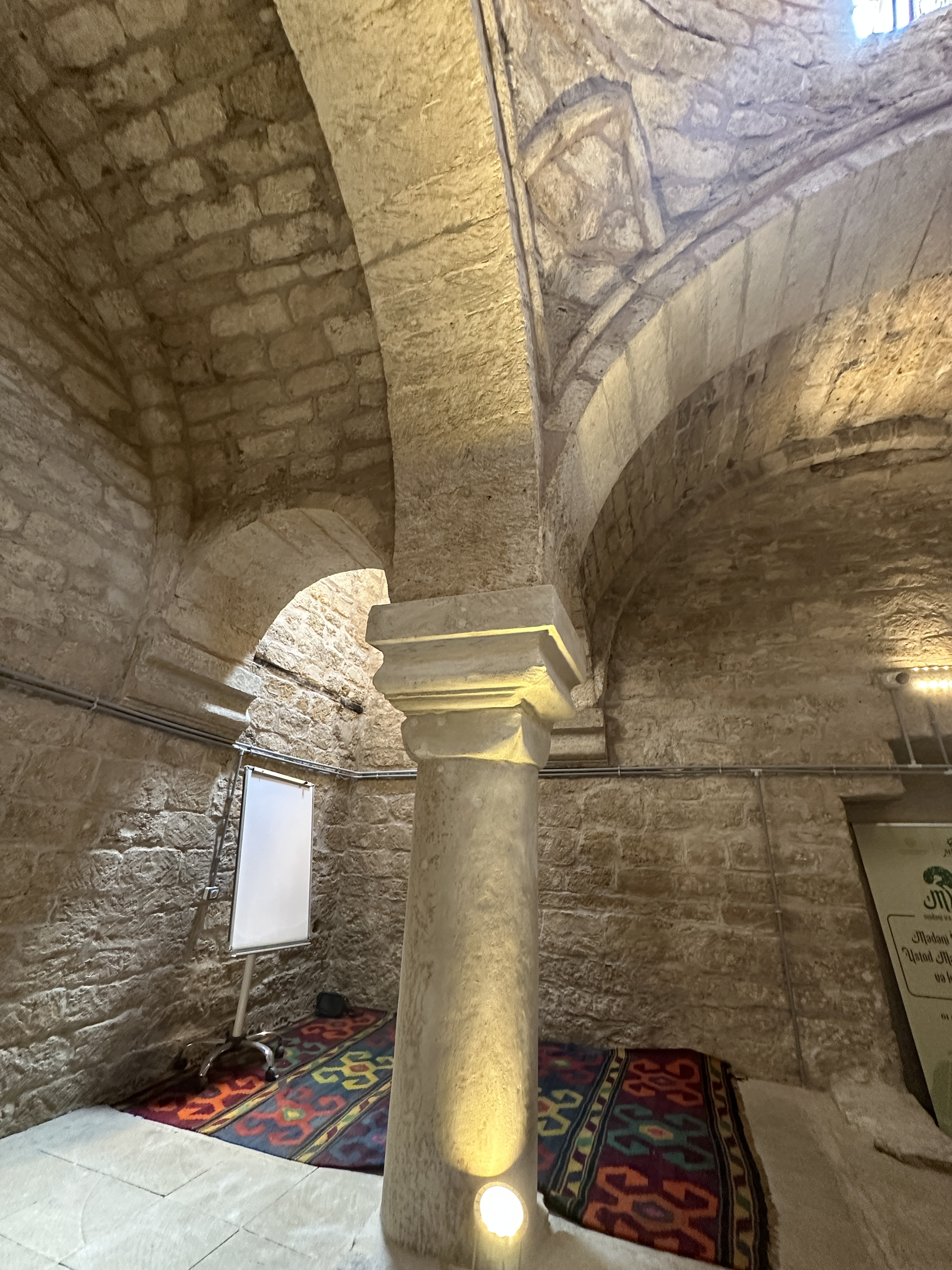

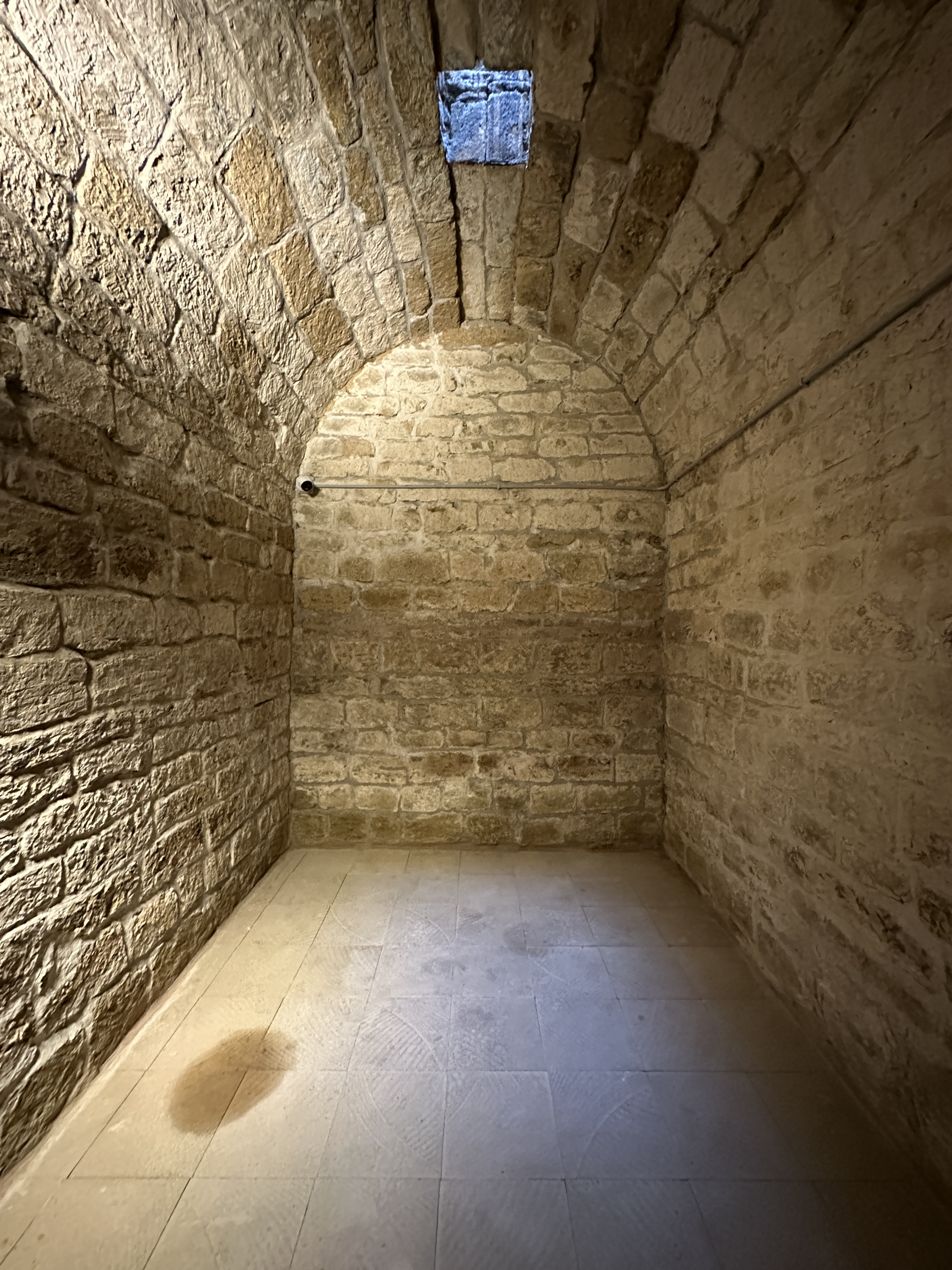

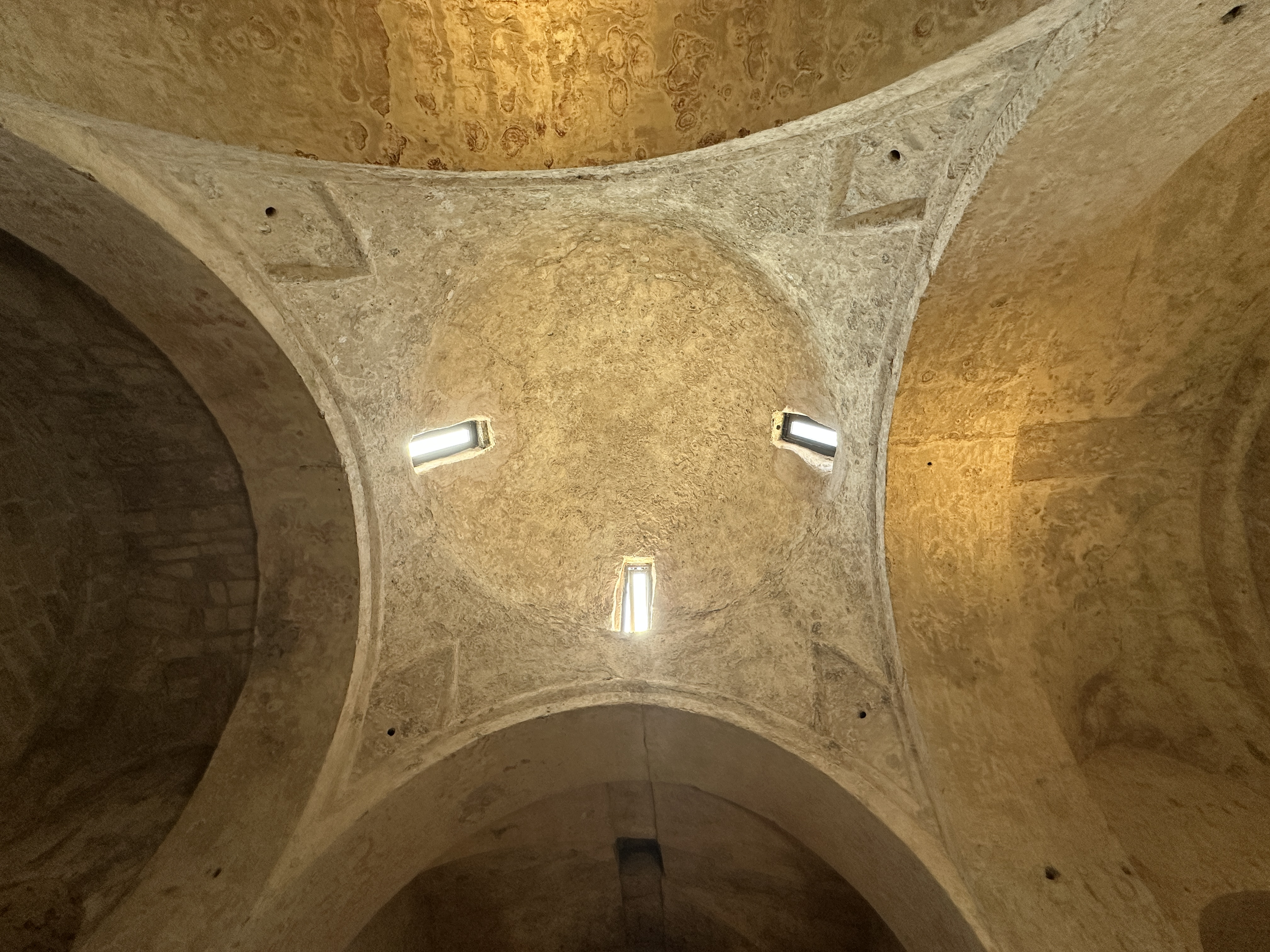

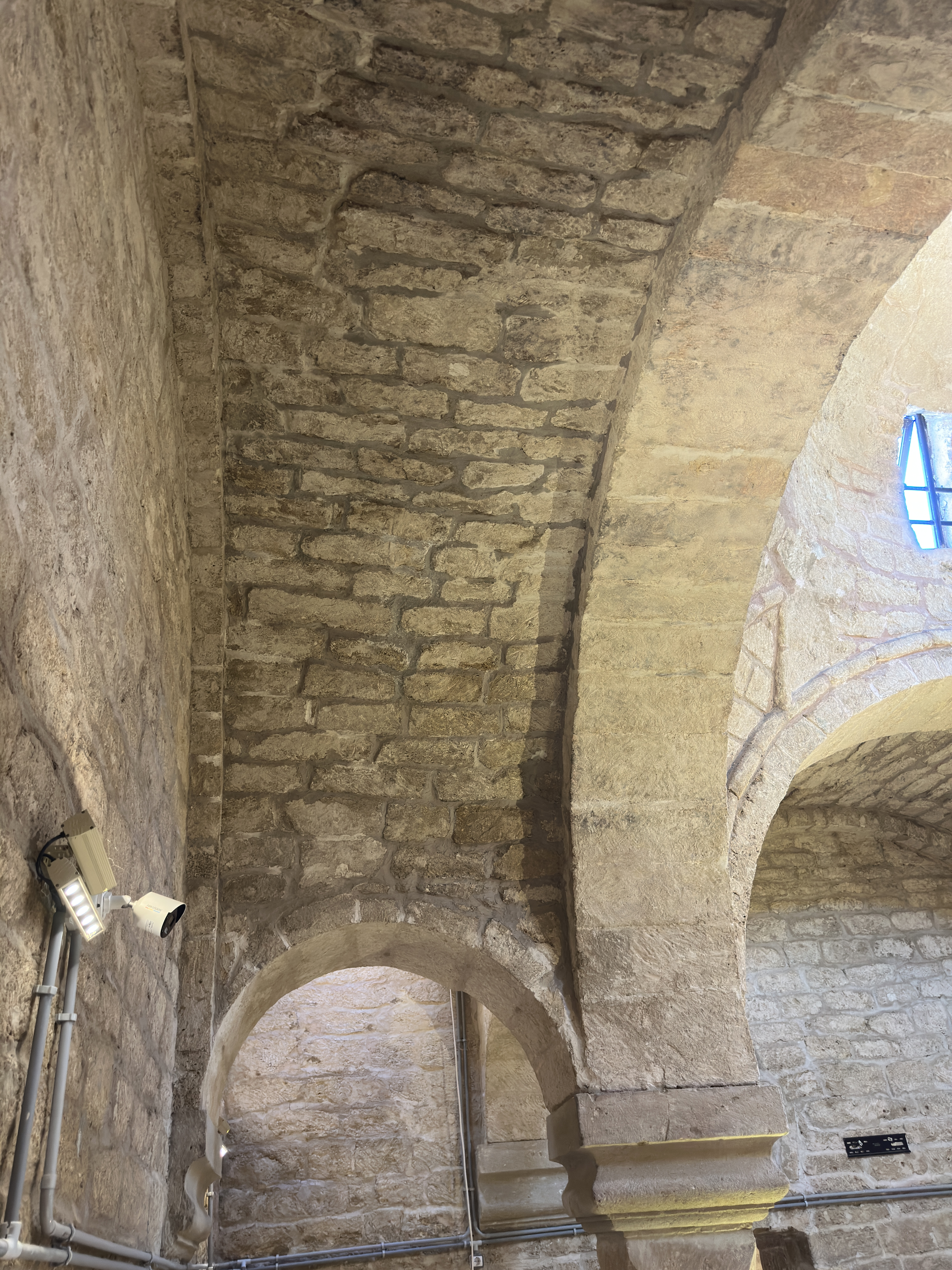

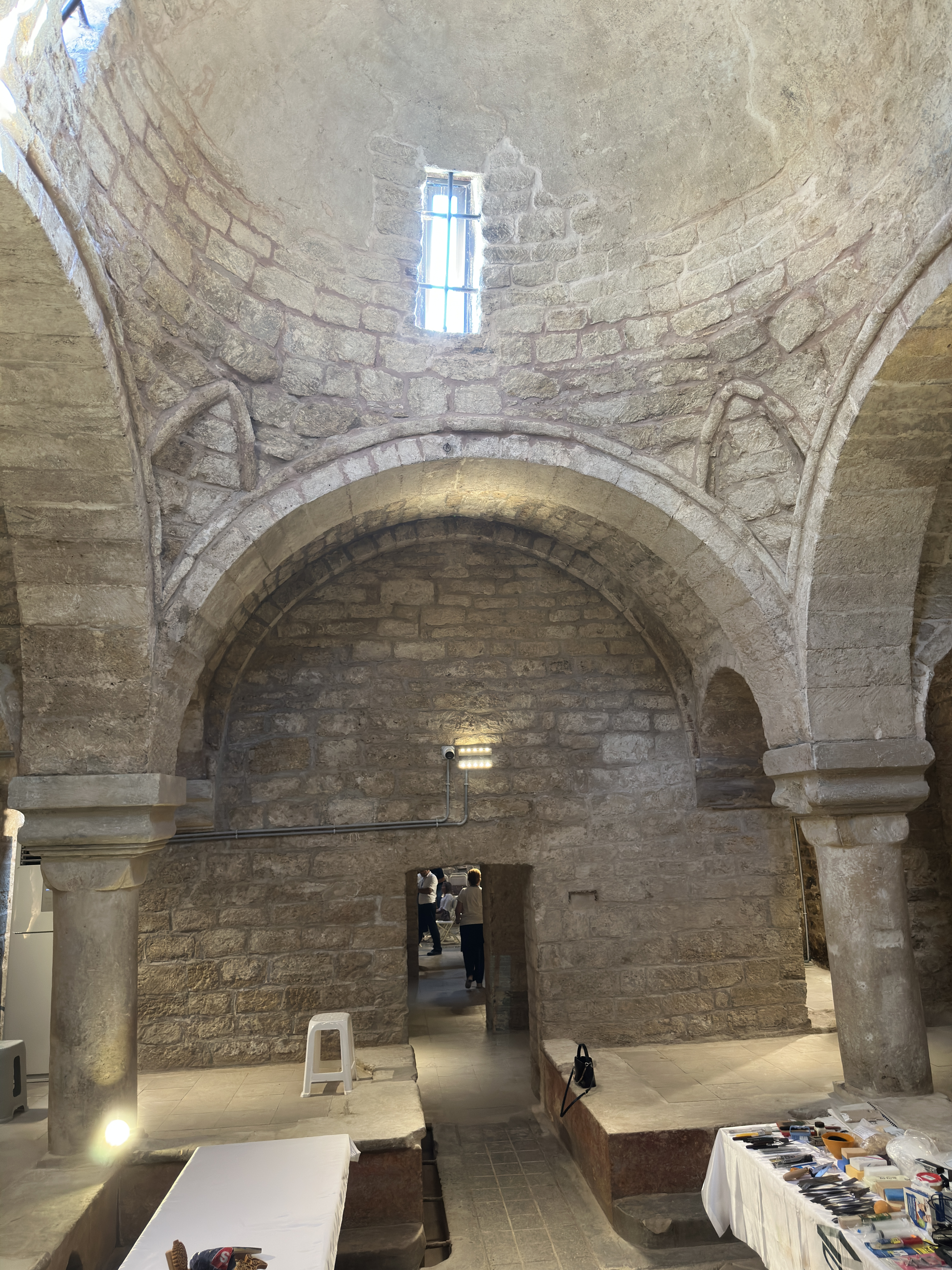

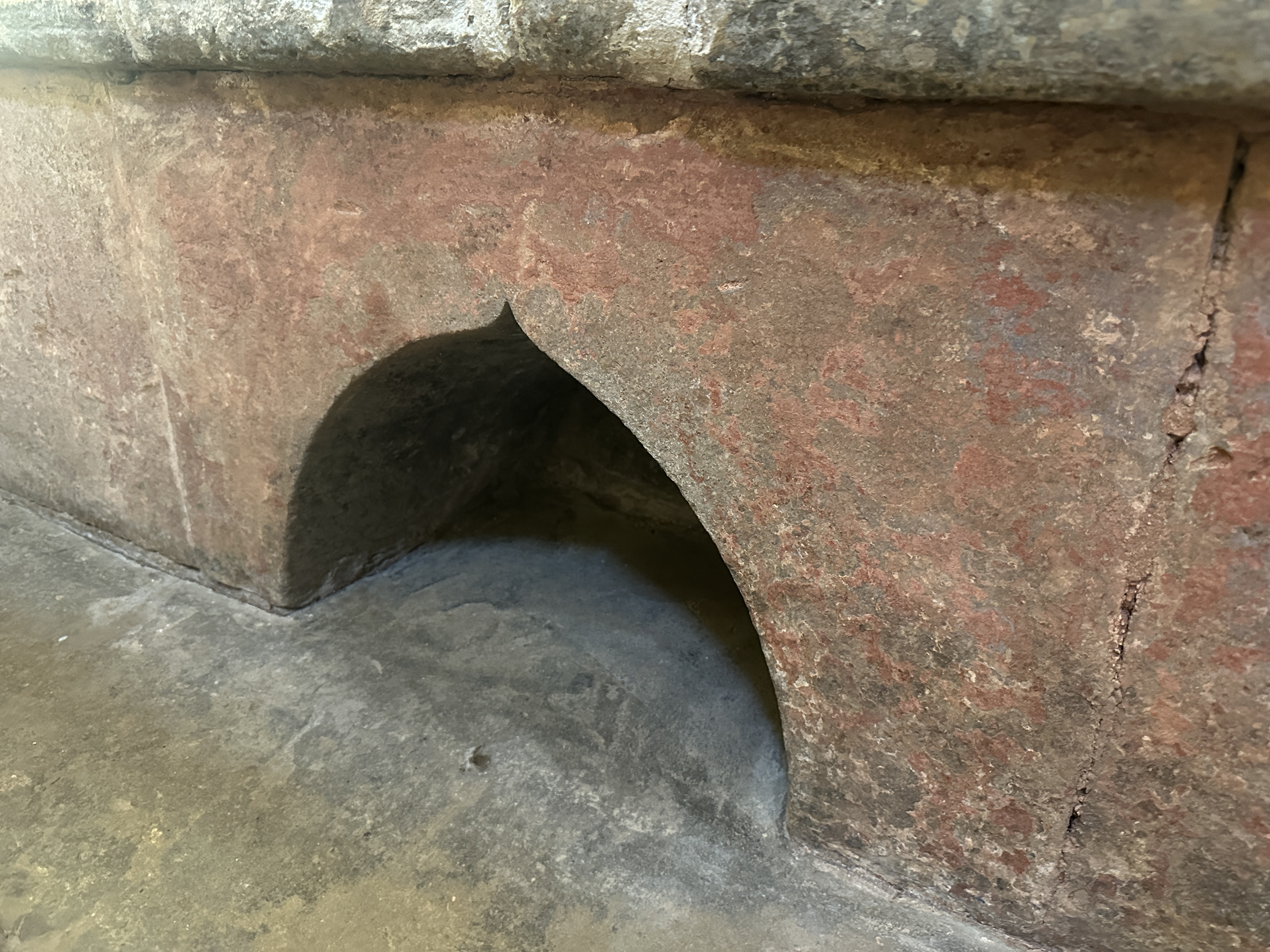
