= Ilyas Ismayilov =

Azerbaijani politician (1938–2025)

İlyas İsmayılov
- İlyas İsmayılov
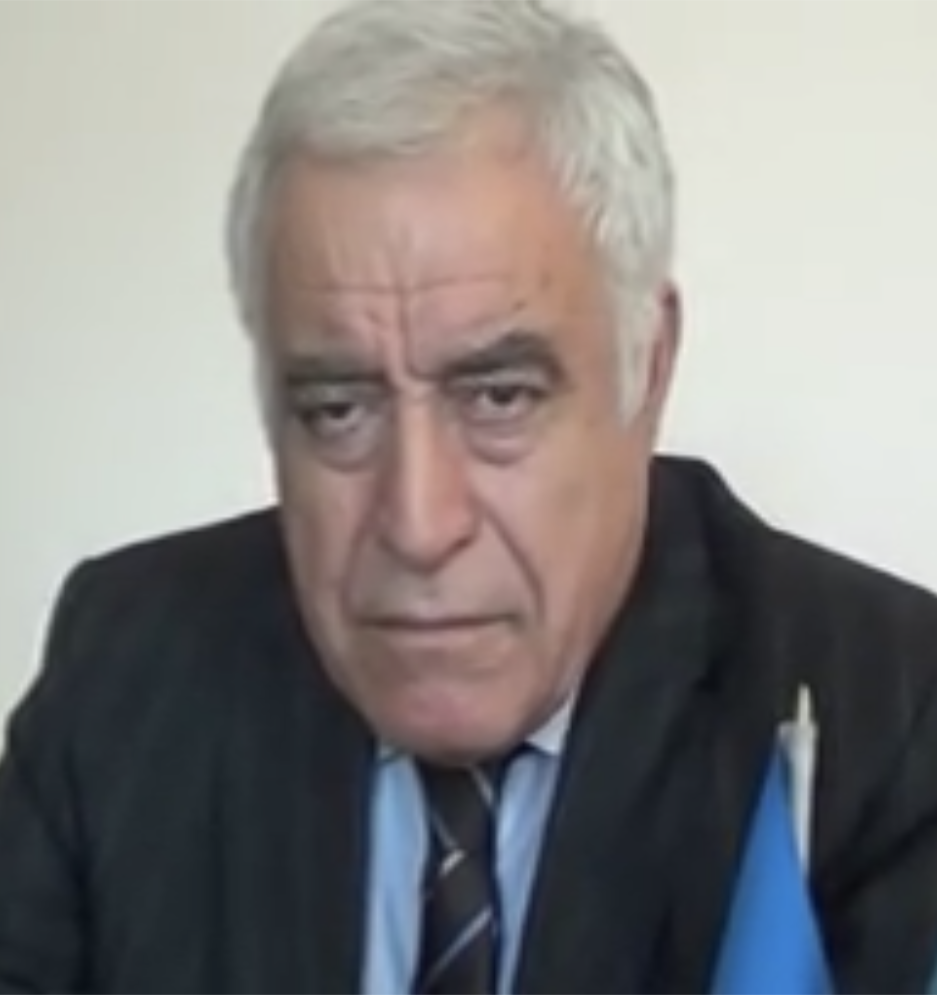
- İsmayılov in 2013

Minister of Justice
- In office 8 April 1992 – 13 January 1995
- Preceded by: Alisaab Orujov
- Succeeded by: Südaba Hasanova

Member of the National Assembly of Azerbaijan
- In office 13 May 2006 – 1 November 2015

Personal details
- Born: Ilyas Abbas oglu Ismayilov; 20 March 1938; Traubenfeld, Azerbaijan SSR, USSR
- Died: 17 February 2025 (aged 86); Baku, Azerbaijan
- Political party: CPSU (1963–1991); Justice Party (1995–1996); ADP (1996–2000); Justice Party (2000–2025)
- Education: Baku State University Law School; Leningrad State University
- Occupation: Lawyer

Ilyas Abbas oglu Ismayilov (Azerbaijani: İlyas Abbas oğlu İsmayılov; 20 March 1938 – 17 February 2025) was an Azerbaijani politician. A member of the Justice Party, he served as Minister of Justice from 1992 to 1995 and was a member of the National Assembly from 2006 to 2015.

Ismayilov died in Baku on 17 February 2025, at the age of 86.
