= Ali S. Hasanov =

Azerbaijani politician

Ali Hasanov Əli Həsənov
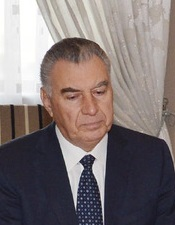

Deputy Prime Minister of Azerbaijan
- In office 18 November 1998 – 21 October 2019
- President: Heydar Aliyev; Ilham Aliyev

Chairman of State Committee of Republic of Azerbaijan for Refugees and IDPs
- In office 18 November 1998 – 21 April 2018
- Succeeded by: Rovshan Rzayev

Personal details
- Born: April 10, 1948 (age 78) Boyuk Marjanly, Jabrayil, Azerbaijan SSR, Soviet Union (now Azerbaijan)

Ali Shamil oghlu Hasanov (Azerbaijani: Əli Şamil oğlu Həsənov) is an Azerbaijani politician who serves as the Deputy Prime Minister of Azerbaijan since 1998, former chairman of State Committee of Republic of Azerbaijan for Refugees and IDPs. He also chairs the State Committee for International Humanitarian Aid.

== Political career ==
Hasanov supervised provision of newly built housing for Azerbaijani refugees and IDPs and often travels to regions of Azerbaijan where the refugees had been settled after the First Nagorno-Karabakh War. The scope of activity of the State Committee of Republic of Azerbaijan for Refugees and IDPs was enhanced by the former President of Azerbaijan Heydar Aliyev in September 1998 with the purpose of bettering the social conditions of the refugees and Ali Hasanov was appointed the chairman of the committee.

As the chairman of the committee, Hasanov supervised large amounts of funding spent by the government and international organizations for needs of refugees. According to the chairman, $1.3 billion from the state budget, $850 million from the State Oil Fund of Azerbaijan and $738 million from international organizations was allocated in 2008.

== See also ==
- Cabinet of Azerbaijan
- Politics of Azerbaijan
