= Alisaab Orujov =

Azerbaijani lawyer and statesman

Alisaab Orujov Əlisaab Orucov

Deputy Prime Minister of Azerbaijan - Extraordinary Plenipotentiary Representative of the President of the Republic of Azerbaijan
- In office April 7, 1992 – July 2, 1992
- President: Yagub Mammadov (acting); Ayaz Mutallibov; Isa Gambar (acting); Abulfaz Elchibey
- Prime Minister: Firuz Mustafayev (acting); Rahim Huseynov

Minister of Justice of the Republic of Azerbaijan
- In office February 5, 1991 – April 7, 1992
- Preceded by: office established
- Succeeded by: Ilyas Ismayilov

Minister of Justice of the Azerbaijan SSR
- In office January 15, 1985 – February 5, 1991
- Preceded by: Nariman Yusifov
- Succeeded by: office changed

Personal details
- Born: January 24, 1946 (age 76) Goychay, Azerbaijan SSR, USSR
- Education: Azerbaijan State University

Alisaab (Alisahib) Saftar oghlu Orujov (Azerbaijani: Əlisaab (Əlisahib) Səftər oğlu Orucov, born January 24, 1946) was an Azerbaijani lawyer and statesman, Minister of Justice of Azerbaijan (1985–1992), Deputy Prime Minister of Azerbaijan - Extraordinary Plenipotentiary Representative of the President of the Republic of Azerbaijan (1992).

== Biography ==
Alisaab Orujov was born on January 24, 1946, in the city of Goychay. In 1953–1964 he studied at Goychay city secondary school No. 3, and in 1966–1971 he studied at the law faculty of the Azerbaijan State University.

In 1971, he started working as a consultant in the Department of Judicial Bodies of the Ministry of Justice of the Azerbaijan SSR, in February–June 1973 he had an internship as a people's judge in the Nasimi district people's court of Baku. From June of the same year he worked as a people's judge in Kirovabad (Ganja) from June to December 1977, and from December 1977 to March 1980 he was a member of the Supreme Court of the Azerbaijan SSR. In March 1980, Alisaab Orujov was elected Deputy Chairman of the Supreme Court of the Azerbaijan SSR, and two years later First Deputy.

Alisaab Orujov was the Minister of Justice of Azerbaijan (the first Minister of Justice of independent Azerbaijan) from January 1985 to April 1992. From April 1992 to July of the same year he worked as Deputy Prime Minister of the Republic of Azerbaijan - Extraordinary Plenipotentiary Representative of the President of the Republic of Azerbaijan, was on the front line during the war in Karabakh.

Alisaab Orujov 1993-1995 - Deputy President of the Azerbaijan National Academy of Arts, from July 1995 - Head of the Notary and VVA Department of the Ministry of Justice of the Republic of Azerbaijan.

Alisaab Orujov was a member of the Communist Party of the Soviet Union since 1973, was elected a deputy of the 11th (1985-1990) and 12th (1990-1991) convocations of the Supreme Soviet of the Azerbaijan SSR.
