= Abid Sharifov =

Azerbaijani politician

Abid Sharifov Abid Şərifov
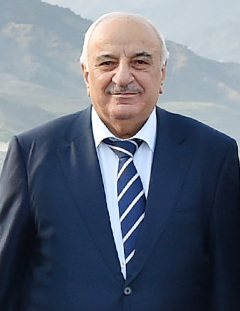

Deputy Prime Minister of Azerbaijan
- In office 20 July 1995 – 21 April 2018
- President: Heydar Aliyev; Ilham Aliyev

Personal details
- Born: January 6, 1940 (age 86) Shaki, Azerbaijan

Abid Sharifov Goja oglu (Azerbaijani: Şərifov Abid Qoca oğlu) is an Azerbaijani politician who has served as Deputy Prime Minister of Azerbaijan from 1995 to 2018.

== Early years ==
Sharifov was born on January 6, 1940, in Shaki, Azerbaijan. In 1962, he graduated from Azerbaijan Technical University with a degree in Construction Engineering. The same year, he was hired by the Baku's Main Construction Department and held various mid and top management positions, eventually becoming the head of the 23rd construction department of Baku in 1972 and chief consultant at Construction Department of Azerbaijan SSR Council of Ministers. Sharifov was later appointed the Head of Azərnəqliyyattikinti (Azerbaijani Transport Construction) and chief of Azərnəqliyyatyoltikinti (Azerbaijani road construction) venture in 1988. In 1991, Sharifov worked as the deputy chief of construction company electrifying Çerkezköy-Kapıkule railway. In 1993, he returned to Azerbaijan and became the President of the state construction company Azərnəqliyyatyoltikinti. Over his construction career working with Heydar Aliyev, he supervised many architectural projects including the building of the Presidential Office, the Ministry of National Security of Azerbaijan, Absheron hotel in Baku, apartment complexes, the President's residence, and others.

== Political career ==
Sharifov was appointed as Deputy Prime Minister of Azerbaijan by President of Azerbaijan Heydar Aliyev in 1995, and in November 2003 he was re-appointed to the same position by the new President Ilham Aliyev. He is in charge of government regulations of construction activity in the country and, as a member of the government commission on emergency situations, travels to places of state emergency. Sharifov also co-chairs the Azerbaijan-Japan Intergovernmental Commission. Overseeing funding and construction of Baku-Tbilisi-Kars Railway has been one of his duties as well.

== Awards ==
Sharifov holds many awards, Order of the Badge of Honour (1976), Order of the October Revolution (1980), Sheref Order (2010), Merited Builder of Azerbaijan and Proud Road Builder titles among them.

Sharifov is married and has two children.

== See also ==
- Cabinet of Azerbaijan
- Politics of Azerbaijan
