= Irshad Aliyev =

Azerbaijani politician

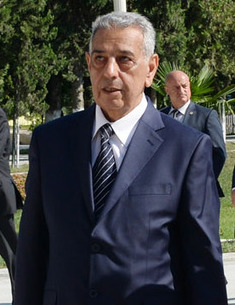

Minister of Food and Agriculture
- In office October 16, 1994 – October 23, 2004
- Preceded by: Rahim Ashrafov
- Succeeded by: Ismet Abbasov

Personal details
- Born: Gürzallar, Gasim Ismailov District, Azerbaijan SSR, USSR (now Goranboy District, Azerbaijan)
- Party: New Azerbaijan Party
- Education: Azerbaijan State Agricultural University
- Occupation: Politician

Irshad Nadir oghlu Aliyev is an Azerbaijani politician. He worked as the Ministry of Food and Agriculture from 1994 to 2004.

Irshad Nadir was the head of Beylagan District Executive Power from 2005 to 2012, when he became the head of the Kurdamir District Executive Power. He left in 2014.
