= Heydar Asadov =

Azerbaijani politician

- Heydər Əsədov
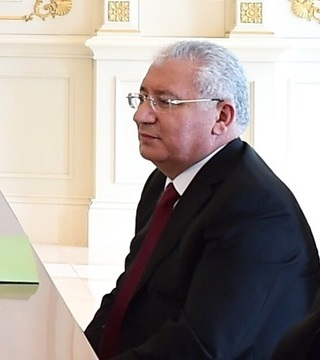
- Asadov in 2016

Minister of Agriculture
- In office October 22, 2013 – April 21, 2018
- President: Ilham Aliyev
- Prime Minister: Artur Rasizade
- Preceded by: Ismat Abasov
- Succeeded by: Inam Karimov

Personal details
- Born: October 24, 1959 (age 66) Sisian, Armenian SSR, Soviet Union
- Profession: Economist

Heydar Khanish oglu Asadov (Azerbaijani: Heydər Əsədov; born 24 October 1959) is the Rector of the Azerbaijan State Maritime Academy (as of April 3, 2019), and ex-Minister of Agriculture of the Republic of Azerbaijan.

== Biography ==
Heydar Khanish oglu Asadov was born on October 24, 1959.

In 1978, he graduated from the accounting department of Baku Soviet Commerce College. In 1983, he graduated from the Accounting and Economics Department of the Azerbaijan Institute of National Economy after D. Bunyadzade. From 1978 to 1984, while studying at the institute, he performed the jobs as an employee, accountant, senior accountant and senior inspector. From 1983 to 1992, he worked as a lecturer and senior lecturer at the Azerbaijan State Economic Institute. In 1987, he defended his thesis at Moscow State University and received the degree of PhD on economic sciences.

From 1992 to 1995, he has been a doctoral student at Marmara University.

In 1995, by the decree of Heydar Aliyev, former President of the Republic of Azerbaijan, he was appointed Deputy Minister of Finance.

From 1996 to 2007 he was the General Director of the State Treasury affiliated to the Ministry of Finance. From 2007 to 2013, he served as Chairman of the Accounts Chamber of the Republic of Azerbaijan.

On October 22, 2013 he was appointed Minister of Agriculture.

On April 3, 2019, he was appointed rector of the Azerbaijan State Maritime Academy.

He is the author of 3 monographs and more than 30 scientific papers.

He is married and has three children.

== Awards ==
- Order of “For Service to the Fatherland” of the 2nd degree (2011)
- Azerbaijan Democratic Republic 100th anniversary medal (2019)
- Order «Shohrat» (2019)

== See also ==
- Ministry of Agriculture (Azerbaijan)
