= Muzamil Abdullayev =

Azerbaijani winemaker and politician (1941–2022)

Minister of Food and Agriculture
- In office 30 July 1993 – 15 October 1994
- Preceded by: position established
- Succeeded by: Tofig Huseynli

Personal details
- Born: 1941 Kirovabad, Azerbaijani SSR, Soviet Union
- Died: 17 June 2022 (aged 80–81)
- Party: CPSU (until 1991)
- Education: Azerbaijan State Agricultural University; Kuban State Technological University; State Agrarian University of Moldova
- Occupation: Winemaker

Muzamil Imran oghlu Abdullayev (1941 – 17 June 2022) was an Azerbaijani winemaker and politician.

He served as the Minister of Food and Agriculture from 1993 to 1994.

Abdullayev died on 17 June 2022.
