= Fuad Naghiyev =

Fuad Naghiyev Fuad Nağıyev

Chairman of the State Tourism Agency of the Republic of Azerbaijan
- Incumbent
- Assumed office 23 April 2018
- Preceded by: position was established

Personal details
- Born: 22 July 1975 (age 50) Baku, Azerbaijan SSR, USSR
- Education: Baku State University; Human Rights Law and Practice Program of Council of Europe at the University of Birmingham

Fuad Humbat oghlu Naghiyev (Azerbaijani: Fuad Hümbət oğlu Nağıyev; 22 July 1975) is the Chairman of the State Tourism Agency of the Republic of Azerbaijan.

== Biography ==
Fuad Naghiyev was born on 22 July 1975 in Baku. In 1992–1997 he studied at the Faculty of Law of Baku State University. He continued his education as a graduate student of the Institute of Philosophy and Law of Azerbaijan National Academy of Sciences in 1997–2000. He studied at the Council of Europe's Human Rights and Practice Program at the University of Birmingham, England, from September to November 1998.

== Career ==
In 2004–2006 F. Naghiyev headed one of the business aviation services of Heydar Aliyev International Airport, in 2006–2009 he was the director of Pasha Inshaat LLC, and in 2007–2009 he was the general director of "Bakı Dəmir-Beton–8" OJSC.

In 2010–2014, he worked as a senior consultant in the legal sector of the Ministry of Culture and Tourism of the Republic of Azerbaijan and was awarded the degree of "2nd degree civil servant". From 2014 to 2017, he worked as an assistant minister with the degree of "1st degree civil servant". From 6 February 2017 to 23 April 2018 he was the director of the National Tourism Promotion Bureau.

According to the decree signed by President Ilham Aliyev on 20 April 2018, the Ministry of Culture of the Republic of Azerbaijan and the State Tourism Agency of the Republic of Azerbaijan were established on the basis of the Ministry of Culture and Tourism of the Republic of Azerbaijan. According to the order of the President of Azerbaijan, Fuad Humbat oglu Naghiyev has been appointed the Chairman of the State Tourism Agency of the Republic of Azerbaijan.
