= Anar Guliyev =

Azerbaijani senior advisor (born 1977)

- Anar Quliyev
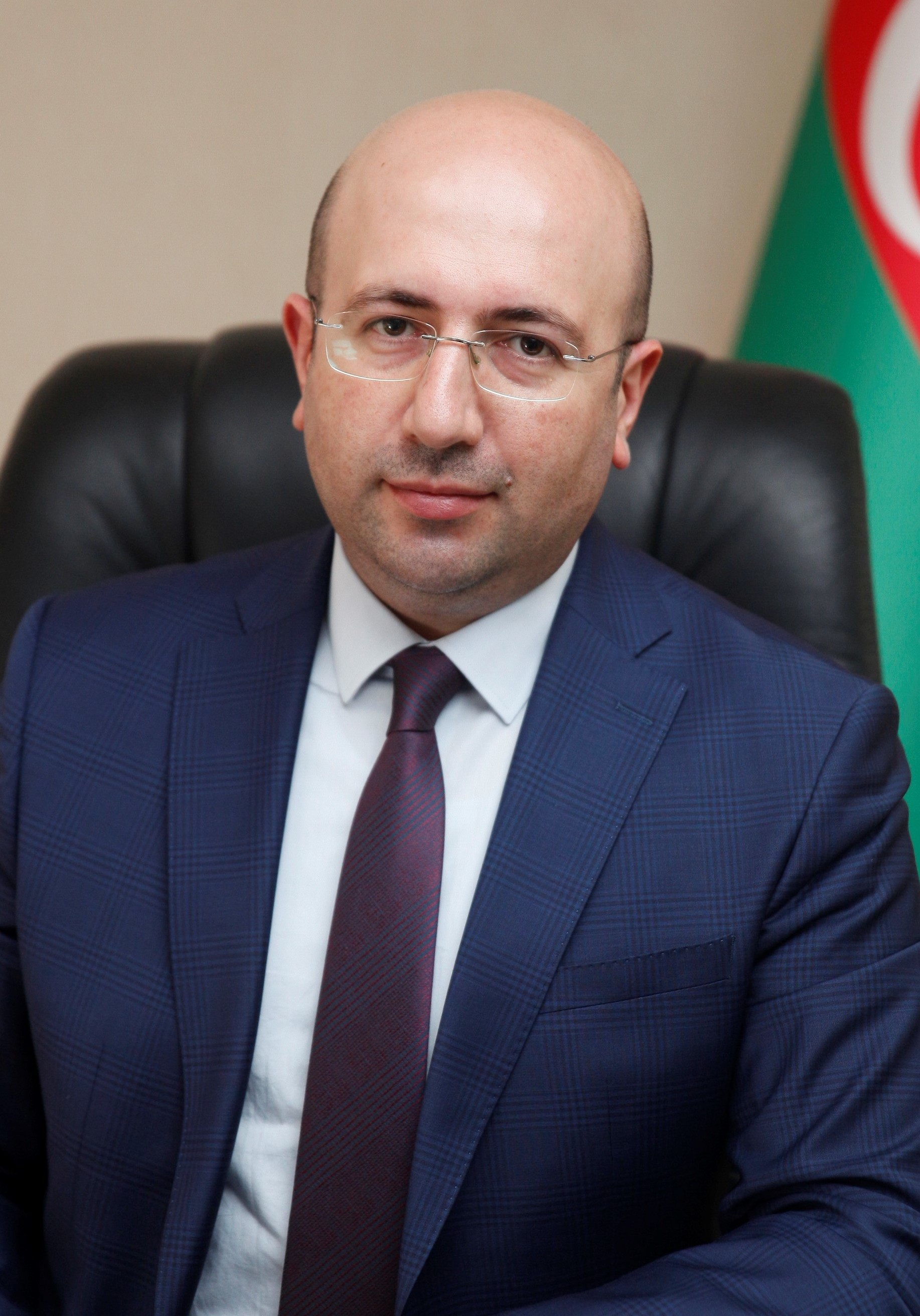
- Guliyev in 2018

Republic of Azerbaijan State Committee on Urban Planning and Architecture
- Incumbent
- Assumed office 8 January 2020

Personal details
- Born: 1977 (age 47–48) Baku, Azerbaijan SSR, Soviet Union (now Baku, Azerbaijan)

Anar Guliyev (born 1977) is chairman of the State Committee on Urban Planning and Architecture of the Republic of Azerbaijan. President of the Target archery federation of Azerbaijan (since 22 may 2024).

== Biography ==
He graduated from the Faculty of Economics of the National Aviation Academy of the Republic of Azerbaijan in 1999, specialized in economics and management in the fields of production and service, and is an engineer-economist.

== Career ==
He served as a senior expert and senior advisor at the Ministry of Economic Development between 2001 and 2005, and worked as investment promotion director at the Export and Investment Promotion Fund in Azerbaijan between 2005 and 2009.

Between 2009 and 2016, he worked as deputy head of department and head of department at the "Icherishehar" State Historical-Architectural Reserve Department under the Council of Ministers, and in 2016–2018 he worked as director advisor and chief. Staff of the State Housing Construction Agency under the President of the Republic of Azerbaijan.

In 2018, he served as chairman of the State Urban Planning and Architecture Committee of the Republic of Azerbaijan.

By the Decree of the President of the Republic of Azerbaijan dated June 19, 2019, Anar Adil oglu Guliyev was appointed as the first deputy chairman of the State Urban Planning and Architecture Committee of the Republic of Azerbaijan.

By the order of the President of the Republic of Azerbaijan dated January 8, 2020, Anar Adil oglu Guliyev was appointed chairman of the State Committee on Urban Planning and Architecture of the Republic of Azerbaijan.

== Awards ==
By the order of the head of state dated 16 May 2014, he was awarded the "Outstanding Achievement in Public Service" medal.
