= Deputy Prime Minister of Azerbaijan =

Member of the Cabinet of Ministers of Azerbaijan

A Deputy Prime Minister of Azerbaijan (Azerbaijani: Azərbaycan Respublikası Baş nazirinin müavini) is a member of the Cabinet of Ministers of Azerbaijan. The role of deputy prime minister of the Republic of Azerbaijan is to coordinate the activities of federal government bodies and carry out other tasks in response to particular issues or events. The most senior of them is the First Deputy Prime Minister of Azerbaijan. The current deputies are Samir Sharifov and Shahin Mustafayev.

== List ==
Image	Deputy Prime Minister	Start date	Expiration date
	Zulfi Hajiyev	May 22, 1991	November 20, 1991
	Matvey Radayev	May 22, 1991	June 2, 1992
	Rahim Huseynov	May 22, 1991	May 4, 1992
	Musa Mammadov	January 2, 1992	March 6, 1992
	Aydin Azizbeyov	February 13, 1992	March 6, 1992
	Alisaab Orujov	April 7, 1992	July 2, 1992
	Rauf Gulmammadov	April 23, 1992	July 4, 1992
	Vahid Ahmadov	April 23, 1992	May 16, 1992
	Rufat Aghayev	May 4, 1992	July 21, 1992
	Firudin Jalilov	May 18, 1992	August 11, 1992
	Asgar Mammadov	June 2, 1992	October 16, 1994
	Surat Huseynov	July 2, 1992	February 17, 1993
	Abbas Abbasov	April 29, 1993	September 16, 1994
	Kamil Valiyev	May 11, 1993	September 2, 1993
	Rasul Guliyev	May 11, 1993	November 8, 1993
	Ali Tahmazov	May 18, 1993	October 16, 1994
	Samad Sadigov	September 1, 1993	October 18, 1998
	Elchin Efendiyev	September 2, 1993	October 18, 1998
	Izzet Rustamov	December 4, 1994	October 18, 1998
	Tofig Azizov	January 13, 1995	October 18, 1998
	Abid Sharifov	July 20, 1995	October 18, 1998
	Elchin Efendiyev	October 18, 1998	January 15, 1999
	Izzet Rustamov	October 18, 1998	January 15, 1999
	Tofig Azizov	October 18, 1998	January 15, 1999
	Abid Sharifov	October 18, 1998	January 15, 1999
	Abid Sharifov	January 15, 1999	October 31, 2003
	Elchin Efendiyev	January 15, 1999	October 31, 2003
	Yagub Eyyubov	July 10, 1999	October 31, 2003
	Hajibala Abutalybov	January 17, 2000	January 30, 2001
	Abid Sharifov	November 10, 2003	October 31, 2008
	Ali S. Hasanov	November 10, 2003	October 31, 2008
	Elchin Efendiyev	November 10, 2003	October 31, 2008
	Abid Sharifov	October 31, 2008	October 19, 2013
	Ali S. Hasanov	October 31, 2008	October 19, 2013
	Elchin Efendiyev	October 31, 2008	October 19, 2013
	Ali S. Hasanov	October 22, 2013	April 18, 2018
	Ali Ahmadov	October 22, 2013	April 18, 2018
	Elchin Efendiyev	October 22, 2013	April 18, 2018
	Ali S. Hasanov	April 21, 2018	October 21, 2019
	Hajibala Abutalybov	April 21, 2018	October 21, 2019
	Ali Ahmadov	April 21, 2018	September 23, 2024
	Shahin Mustafayev	October 22, 2019	Present
	Samir Sharifov	10 January 2025	Present
