= Gürzallar =

- Municipality
- Location within Azerbaijan
- Coordinates: 40°29′52″N 46°33′03″E
- Country: Azerbaijan
- District: Goranboy

Population
  - Total: 535
- Time zone: UTC+4 (AZT)

Gürzallar (Gurzallar; Armenian: Գյուզալար) is a village and municipality in Goranboy District, Azerbaijan.
