= Majnun Mammadov =

Azerbaijani government official (born 1983)

- Məcnun Məmmədov
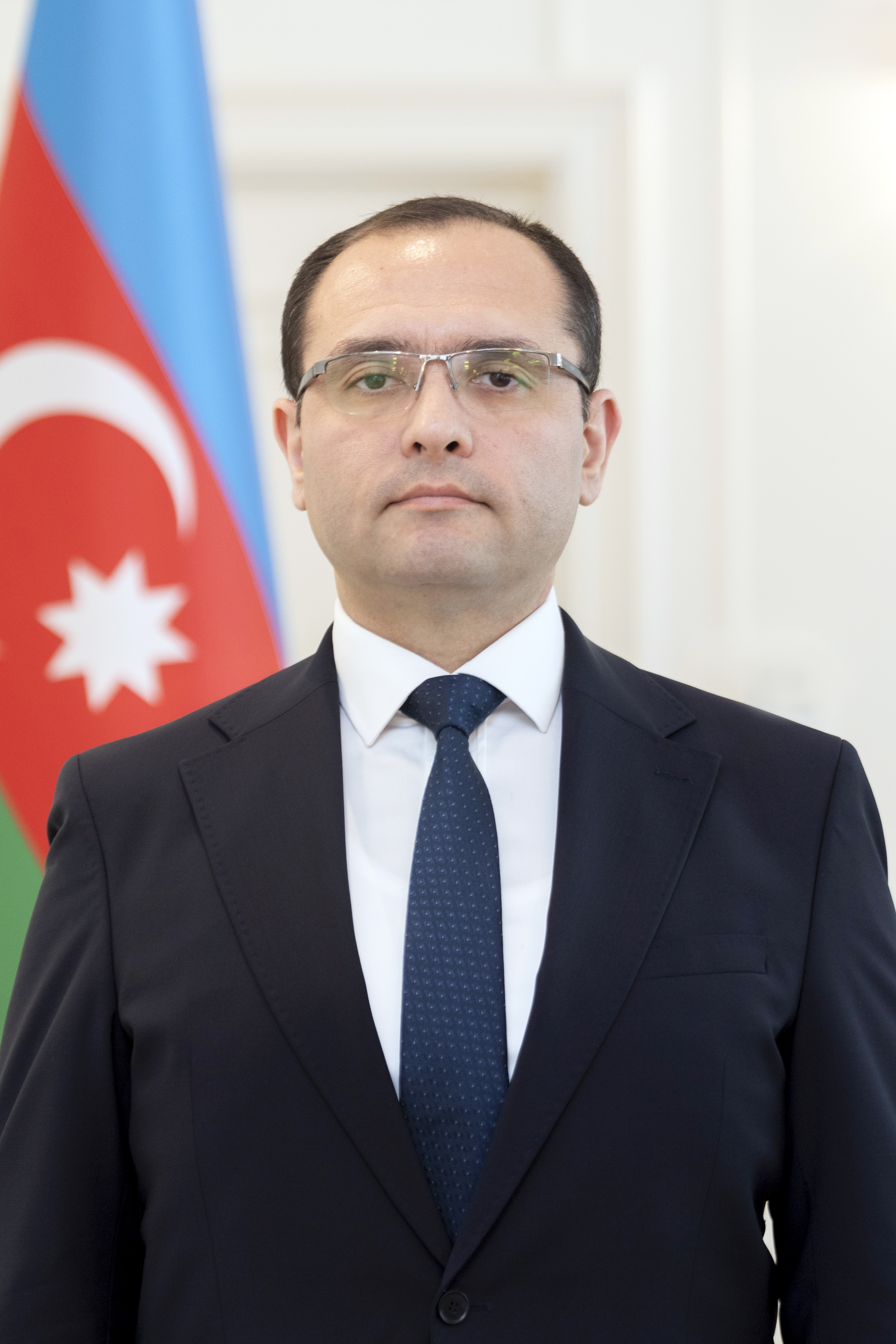
- Official portrait, 2023

Minister of Agriculture
- Incumbent
- Assumed office 14 April 2023
- President: Ilham Aliyev
- Preceded by: Inam Karimov

Personal details
- Born: 15 September 1983 (age 41); Baku, Azerbaijan SSR, Soviet Union
- Political party: Independent
- Education: Azerbaijan State University of Economics; Lahore University of Management Sciences

Majnun Gadir oglu Mammadov (Azerbaijani: Məcnun Qadir oğlu Məmmədov; born 15 September 1983) is an Azerbaijani politician serving as Minister of Agriculture of the Republic of Azerbaijan since 2023.

== Early life and education ==
Majnun Mammadov was born on september 15, 1983 in Mincivan, Zangilan. In 2000–2004, he received a bachelor's degree in "Accounting & Audit" from the Azerbaijan State University of Economics, and then an MBA from the Lahore University of Management Sciences in Pakistan.

In 2017, he participated in the SABIT (Special American Business Internship Training) program for Innovation and efficiency in Agribusiness in the United States.

== Career ==
Majnun Mammadov started his professional career in Deloitte in 2007. In 2010–2011 he worked in AER LLC, dairy and ice-cream manufacturing. Then, in 2011–2015, he worked as Business development director in Modern Group, leading several agricultural and food projects. Since 2015 he has worked in various positions in the company "PMD Group" under "Pasha Holding".

Majnun Mammadov also held various positions in the companies "Modern Group", "Deloitte", "ABN AMRO Bank Kazakhstan".

Since 2018 he has been working as a manager at "Agro Food Investment" LLC.

Majnun Mammadov is also the head of "Grand-Agro" LLC, the horticultural and innovative nursery of "Pasha Holding".

On 14 April 2023, by order of the President of the Republic of Azerbaijan Ilham Aliyev, Majnun Mammadov was appointed Minister of Agriculture of the Republic of Azerbaijan.
