= State Tourism Agency of the Republic of Azerbaijan =

- Azərbaycan Respublikası Dövlət Turizm Agentliyi

Agency overview
- Formed: April 20, 2018
- Jurisdiction: Government of Azerbaijan
- Headquarters: Baku

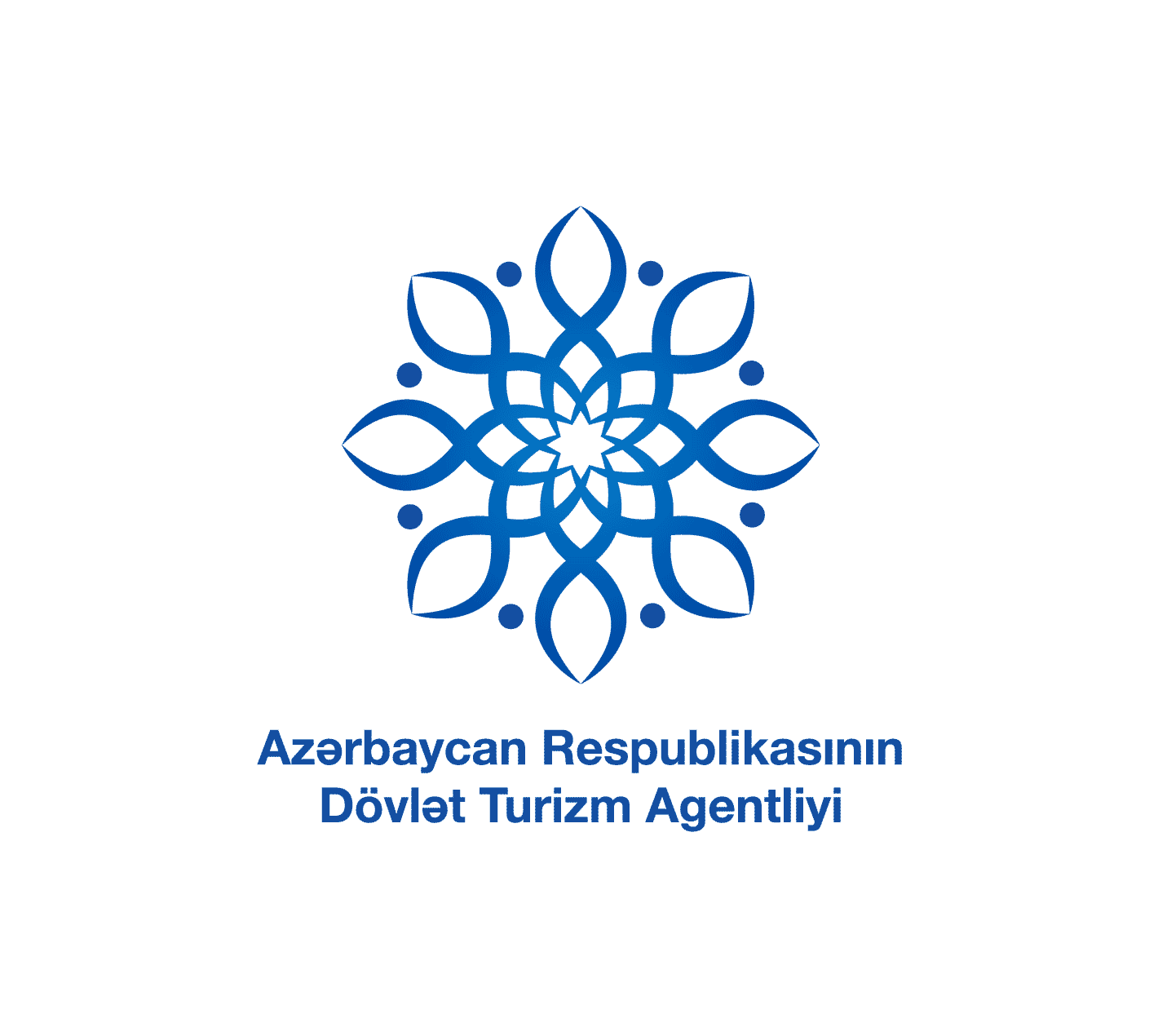

The State Tourism Agency of the Republic of Azerbaijan is a governmental body established by a decree of the President of Azerbaijan with the purpose of improving public administration in the domains of culture and tourism.

== History ==
The agency was established on April 20, 2018, on the basis of the Ministry of Culture and Tourism of the Republic of Azerbaijan.

On April 21, 2018, by the presidential decree “On the new composition of the Cabinet of Ministers of the Republic of Azerbaijan” Fuad Nagiyev was appointed as the Chairman of the State Tourism Agency.

== Structure ==
According to the presidential decree dated September 21, 2018, the structure of the agency consists of the Apparatus of the State Tourism Agency (including its divisions and sectors) and the Regional Tourism Offices.

According to the presidential decree titled “On Ensuring the Activity of the State Tourism Agency of the Republic of Azerbaijan,” dated September 21, 2018, the number of employees for the agency was set at 55.

== International Cooperation ==
The State Tourism Agency of the Republic of Azerbaijan is currently cooperating with many international organizations such as World Tourism Organization UNWTO, Black Sea Economic Cooperation (BSEC), Cooperation Council of Turkic Speaking States, Organization for Democracy and Economic Development (GUAM), Economic Cooperation Organization (ECO) and several other organizations.

== Subordinate agencies ==
Educational institutions (Azerbaijan Tourism and Management University, Baku Tourism Vocational School and Mingachevir Tourism College).

Tourism Information Centers (Baku, Quba, Khachmaz, Shamakhi, Ismayilli, Qabala, Zaqatala, Ganja, Barda, Lankaran and Shaki Tourism Information Centers).

The Azerbaijan Tourism Board is a public legal entity operating under the State Tourism Agency of the Republic of Azerbaijan. Its primary objective is to enhance the country's competitiveness in the global tourism market by developing and promoting Azerbaijan's tourism brand both domestically and internationally.

The Reserves Management Center is a public legal entity established under the State Tourism Agency. It is responsible for the scientific, historical, and cultural research, preservation, development, and sustainable use of elements of Azerbaijan’s tangible and intangible cultural heritage. The following state reserves operate under the supervision of the Center: Yanar Dagh State Historical-Cultural and Natural Reserve, Ateshgah Temple State Historical-Architectural Reserve, Basqal State Historical-Cultural Reserve, Khinalig State Historical, Architectural and Ethnographic Reserve, Lahij Historical-Cultural Reserve, Yukhari Bash Historical-Architectural Reserve (including the “Caravanserai” historical complex in Sheki), and Kish State Historical-Architectural Reserve.

== See also ==
- Ministry of Culture (Azerbaijan)
- Tourism in Azerbaijan
