= State Committee of Republic of Azerbaijan for Refugees and IDPs =

State Committee of the Republic of Azerbaijan for Affairs of Refugees and IDPs
- Azərbaycan Respublikasının Qaçqınların və Məcburi Köçkünlərin İşləri Üzrə Dövlət Komitəsi
- Coat of Arms of Azerbaijan

Agency overview
- Formed: September 19, 1989
- Superseding agency: January 5, 1993
- Headquarters: Baku, Tbilisi Ave., 57, Baku, Azerbaijan Republic 1009
- Agency executive: Rovshan Rzayev, Chairman of the State Committee for Affairs of Refugees and IDPs
- Website: www.refugees-idps-committee.gov.az

The State Committee of the Republic of Azerbaijan for Affairs of Refugees and IDPs (Azerbaijani: Azərbaycan Respublikasının Qaçqınların və Məcburi Köçkünlərin İşləri Üzrə Dövlət Komitəsi) is a governmental agency within the Cabinet of Ministers of Azerbaijan in charge of regulation of the issues related to refugees and internally displaced persons in Azerbaijan, including humanitarian aid and accommodation.

== History ==
According to the Decree of the Supreme Council's Presidium of Azerbaijan SSR dated September 19, 1989 with the purpose of solving the questions, connected with reception, accommodation and living conditions of the refugees and for coordinating the activity of Soviet, economic, administrative and public organizations of the republic in this sphere, The State Committee of Azerbaijan SSR for Affairs of People Compelled to Leave Their Homes was established within the government of Azerbaijan SSR.

On January 5, 1993 the committee was renamed to State Committee of Republic of Azerbaijan for Affairs of Refugees and IDPs.

== Main objectives ==
As per Republic's of Azerbaijan regulations dated February 1, 2005, the main goals of committee are the temporary settlement, repatriation and social protection of the refugees, immigrants and the persons forced out from their homes, assessed to receive the status of a refugee (seeking refuge); improvement of their social living conditions in the territories freed from occupation, conferring the status of "refugee" or "internally displaced person", in order and on the basis of established by the legislation of Azerbaijan Republic, delivery of the refugee certificates to them, confirming this status, and deprivation of such persons of this status, dissemination of facts of mass infringement of the rights of refugees and the internally displaced persons, maintaining statistical date on refugees and the internally displaced persons in places of their accommodation; working with the international and non-governmental organizations with the purpose of realization of various measures on rehabilitation and re-integration of refugees and the internally displaced persons; increasing employment and reduction of poverty in places of their time accommodation and during repatriation, creation of conditions for returning refugees and the internally displaced persons in the residences, conducting works on construction and repair of housing and social objects for them.

According to the Chairman Ali Hasanov, $1.3 billion from the state budget, $850 million from the State Oil Fund of Azerbaijan and $738 million from international organizations was allocated in 2008.

== See also ==
- Cabinet of Azerbaijan
