= State Committee on Urban Planning and Architecture (Azerbaijan) =

Cabinet position in Azerbaijan

State Committee of Urban Planning and Architecture of the Republic of Azerbaijan
- Azərbaycan Respublikası Dövlət Şəhərsalma və Arxitektura Komitəsi
- Coat of Arms of Azerbaijan

Agency overview
- Formed: February 28, 2006
- Jurisdiction: Government of Azerbaijan
- Headquarters: 65 Fizuli Street, 3rd floor, Baku, Azerbaijan Republic AZ1014
- Agency executive: Anar Guliyev, Chairman of the State Committee of Urban Planning and Architecture
- Website: www.arxkom.gov.az

The State Committee of Urban Planning and Architecture (Azerbaijani: Azərbaycan Respublikası Dövlət Şəhərsalma və Arxitektura Komitəsi) is a governmental agency within the Cabinet of Azerbaijan. It is in charge of regulating the urban construction and development and overseeing architectural activities in Azerbaijan. The Committee is headed by Anar Guliyev.

== History ==
The committee was established on February 28, 2006 on the basis of State Construction and Architecture Committee which was abolished on the same day and its component entities of Azərdövlətsənayelayihə State Design Institute, State Appraisal Department were transferred to the Ministry of Emergency Situations. On April 4, 2007, in accordance with the Presidential Decree No. 2081, Abbas Alasgarov was appointed as its chairman.

== Structure ==
The committee is headed by the Chairman of the collegium of six members which include the chairman of Nakhichevan AR Committee for City Building and Architecture, chief of Administration of State Committee for City Building and Architecture, director of the Department of Architecture within the committee, director of the Department for Documentation and Compliance of Architectural Planning, director of Azərmemarlayihə State Design Institute and director of Baku State Design Institute. Main functions of the committee are ensuring compliance of urban construction with the state policies of Azerbaijan Republic; development of the city building sector; protection and preservation of traditions of city building and national architecture; assurance of proper use of territories and their resources in cities and their surroundings; preparations of city building methodologies and manuals; assurance in increasing quality in architectural planning and design of buildings, towers and other complexes, etc. The committee, in cooperation with Mayoralty of Baku and other executive governmental offices, also oversees preservation and storage of dismantled monuments. One of the largest projects on the committee's agenda is the development of Greater Baku, a project to be funded by the World Bank for development of Baku, Sumgayit, Absheron for the next 20 years.

== See also ==
- Cabinet of Azerbaijan
- Architecture of Azerbaijan
