= Cabinet of Azerbaijan =

Advisory body in Azerbaijan

Cabinet of Ministers of the Republic of Azerbaijan
- Azərbaycan Respublikasının Nazirlər Kabineti
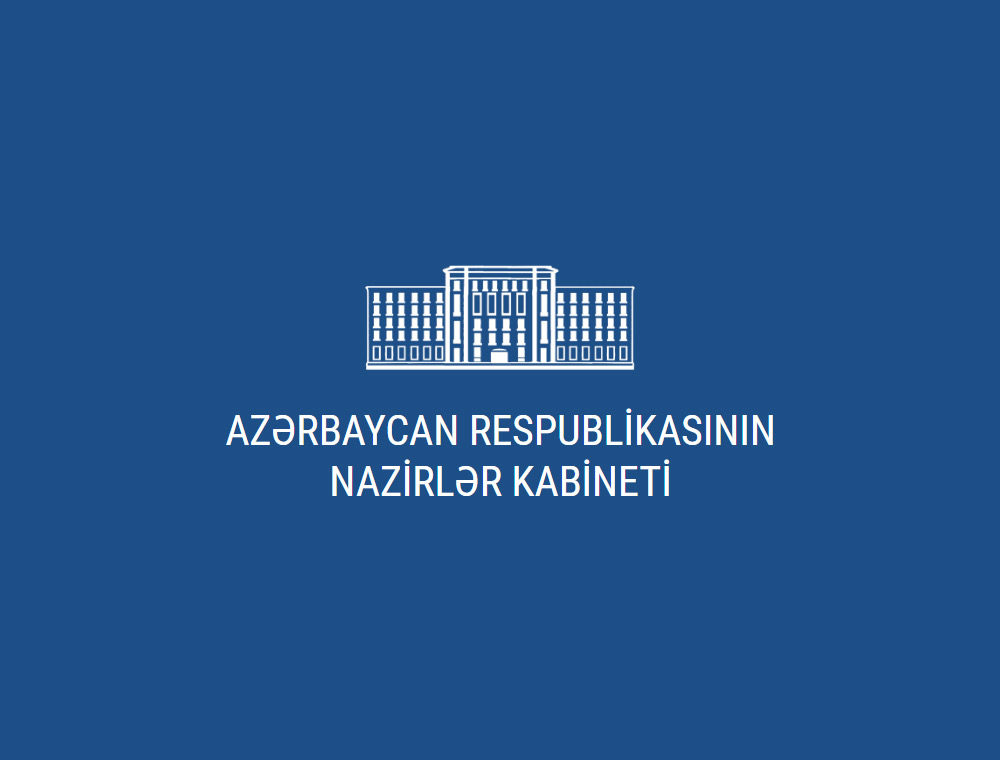

Agency overview
- Formed: October 18, 1991; 34 years ago
- Jurisdiction: Government of Azerbaijan
- Headquarters: 68 Lermontov str, Baku, Azerbaijan AZ1066
- Agency executive: Ali Asadov, Prime Minister
- Website: www.cabmin.gov.az

The Cabinet of Ministers of the Republic of Azerbaijan (Azerbaijani: Azərbaycan Respublikasının Nazirlər Kabineti) is the highest executive body of Azerbaijan, the executive and governing body over the ministries and other central executive bodies under the president of the Republic of Azerbaijan. According to Article 119 of the Constitution of the Republic of Azerbaijan, the Cabinet of Ministers is responsible for preparing and submitting the draft state budget to the President, as well as ensuring its execution. It is also tasked with implementing the country's financial, credit, and monetary policies, along with carrying out state economic and social allowance programs. Additionally, the Cabinet supervises ministries and other central executive authorities, holding the power to annul their acts if necessary.

== Chiefs of State ==
Main office-holders
Office	Name	Party	Since
President	İlham Aliyev	New Azerbaijan Party (YAP)	15 October 2003
Vice President	Mehriban Aliyeva	New Azerbaijan Party (YAP)	21 February 2017

The head of state and head of government are separate from the country's law-making body. The President is the head of the state and head of the executive branch. The people elect the president; the President appoints the Vice President, and the Prime Minister is nominated by the President and confirmed by the National Assembly of Azerbaijan. The President appoints all cabinet-level government administrators (ministers, heads of other central and local executive bodies) and has the competence to chair meetings of the Cabinet. President also has the competence to cancel the orders and resolutions of the Cabinet. In the 2009 Referendum, the Constitution of Azerbaijan was amended, abolishing any term limit for the office of President.

== Cabinet members ==
The Cabinet of Ministers is composed of the prime minister, their deputies, ministers, and heads of other central bodies of executive power. The Cabinet resigns when a newly elected president takes their rights and begins carrying out their powers. As a rule, the prime minister chairs the meetings of the Cabinet.

Office	Incumbent	Image	Since	Age	Party
Prime Minister	Ali Asadov		8 October 2019	69	New Azerbaijan Party
First Deputy Prime Minister	Yaqub Eyyubov		13 February 2003	80	New Azerbaijan Party
Deputy Prime Minister	Samir Sharifov		10 January 2025	64	New Azerbaijan Party
Deputy Prime Minister	Shahin Mustafayev		22 October 2019	61	New Azerbaijan Party
Minister of Agriculture	Majnun Mammadov		14 April 2023	42	Independent
Minister of Culture	Adil Karimli		14 April 2023	46	Independent
Minister of Defense	Zakir Hasanov		22 October 2013	67	Independent
Minister of Defense Industry	Madat Guliyev		20 June 2019	67	Independent
Minister of Ecology and Natural Resources	Mukhtar Babayev		23 April 2018	58	New Azerbaijan Party
Minister of Economy	Mikayil Jabbarov		23 October 2019	49	Independent
Minister of Science and Education	Emin Amrullayev		27 July 2020	43	Independent
Minister of Emergency Situations	Kamaladdin Heydarov		6 February 2006	65	Independent
Minister of Energy	Parviz Shahbazov		12 October 2017	56	Independent
Minister of Finance	Samir Sharifov		18 April 2006	64	Independent
Minister of Foreign Affairs	Jeyhun Bayramov		16 July 2020	53	Independent
Minister of Healthcare	Teymur Musayev		19 January 2022	55	Independent
Minister of Internal Affairs	Vilayet Eyvazov		20 June 2019	58	Independent
Minister of Justice	Fikrat Mammadov		19 April 2000	71	Independent
Minister of Labour and Social Protection of Population	Sahil Babayev		21 April 2018	46	New Azerbaijan Party
Minister of Digital Development and Transport	Rashad Nabiyev		25 January 2021	49	Independent
Minister of Youth and Sports	Farid Gayibov		9 September 2021	47	Independent
Chair of State Committee for City Building and Architecture	Anar Guliyev		8 January 2020	48	Independent
Chair of State Committee for Family, Women and Children Affairs	Bahar Muradova		12 March 2020	64	New Azerbaijan Party
Chair of State Committee for Refugees and IDPs	Rovshan Rzayev		21 April 2018	64	Independent
Chair of State Committee on Work with Diaspora	Fuad Muradov		23 April 2018	47	Independent
Chair of State Committee for Work with Religious Organizations	Mubariz Gurbanli		21 July 2014	72	New Azerbaijan Party
Chair of State Customs Committee	Safar Mehdiyev		23 April 2018	53	Independent
Chair of State Statistics Committee	Tahir Budagov		13 August 2015	61	New Azerbaijan Party
Chief of Foreign Intelligence Service	Orkhan Sultanov		14 December 2015	49	Independent
Chief of State Border Service	Elchin Guliyev		31 July 2002	58	Independent
Chief of State Migration Service	Vusal Huseynov		23 April 2018	46	New Azerbaijan Party
Chief of State Security Service	Ali Naghiyev		20 June 2019	67	Independent
Chief of State Service for Mobilization and Conscription	Mürsal Ibrahimov		14 April 2023	55	Independent
Chair of State Food Safety Agency	Goshgar Tahmazli		25 December 2017	56	Independent
Chair of State Tourism Agency	Fuad Naghiyev		23 April 2018	51	Independent

== Procedure for appointment ==
The President appoints the prime minister with the consent of the National Assembly. The proposed candidate for the post of prime minister is submitted for consideration to the Assembly by the President not later than one month from the day when the President begins carrying out their powers, or not later than two weeks from the day of the resignation of the Cabinet. The Assembly adopts a resolution concerning the candidate to the post of prime minister not later than within one week from the day when such candidacy has been proposed. Should this procedure be violated, or candidatures proposed by the President for the post of prime minister be rejected three times, then the President may appoint a prime minister without consent of the Assembly.

== List of cabinets ==
- First cabinet of Azerbaijan Democratic Republic
- Second cabinet of Azerbaijan Democratic Republic
- Third cabinet of Azerbaijan Democratic Republic
- Fourth cabinet of Azerbaijan Democratic Republic
- Fifth cabinet of Azerbaijan Democratic Republic
- 8th Government of Azerbaijan

== Picture gallery ==
Government House of Baku

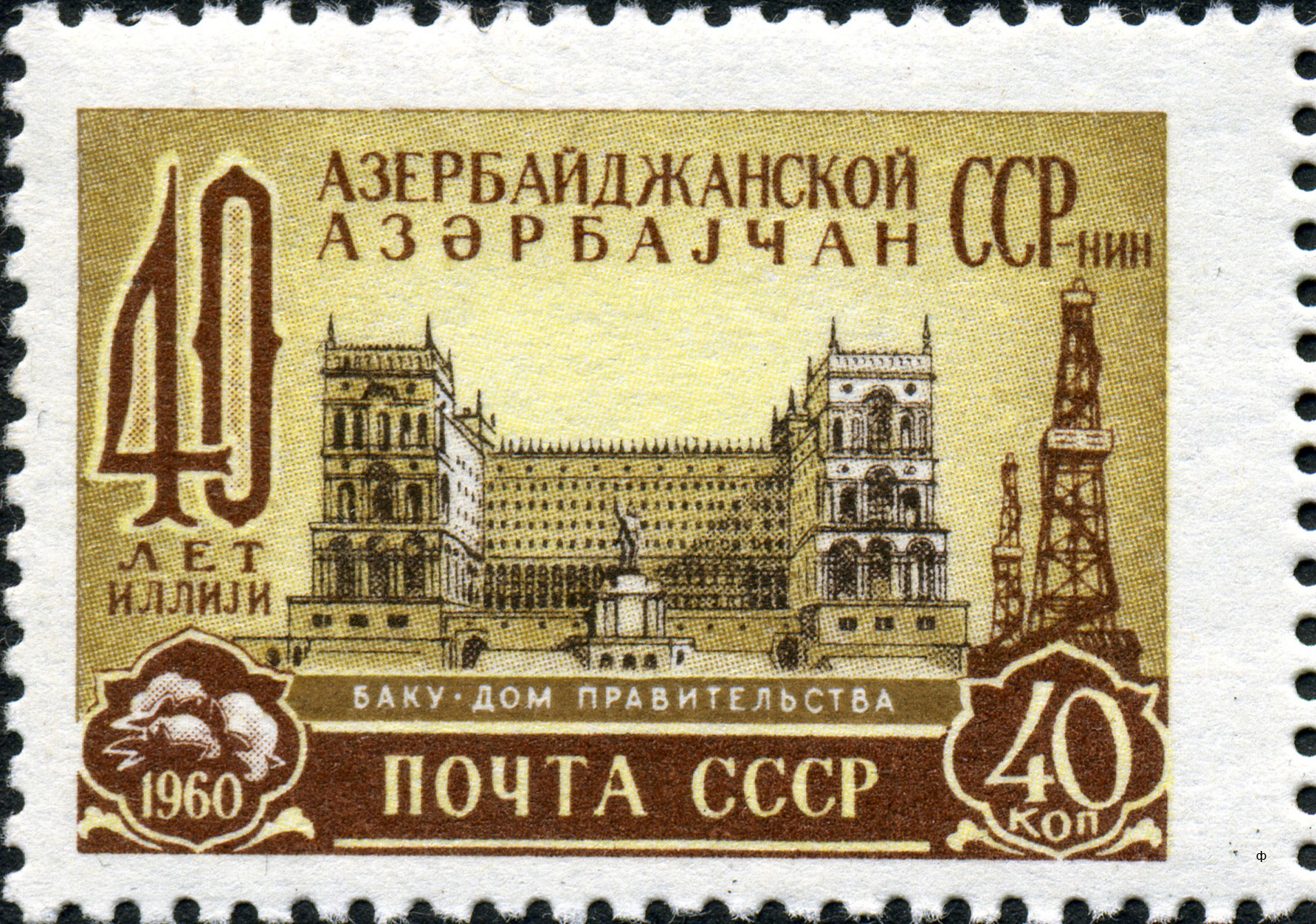
The building on a Soviet stamp 40th anniversary of Azerbaijan SSR

== See also ==
- President of Azerbaijan
- Vice President of Azerbaijan
- Prime Minister of Azerbaijan
- Cabinets of Azerbaijan Democratic Republic in 1918–1920
- First cabinet of Azerbaijan Democratic Republic
- List of national legislatures
- List of national leaders
