= Südaba Hasanova =

Azerbaijani magistrate

Südaba Hasanova Order of Glory
- Südabə Cəmşid qızı Həsənova

2nd President of the Supreme Court
- In office 18 April 2000 – 19 April 2005
- President: Heydar Aliyev; Ilham Aliyev
- Preceded by: Khanlar Hajiyev
- Succeeded by: Ramiz Rzayev

Minister of Justice
- In office 10 January 1995 – 18 April 2000
- Preceded by: Ilyas Ismayilov
- Succeeded by: Fikrat Mammadov

Member of the Constitutional Court
- Incumbent
- Assumed office 23 December 2005

Personal details
- Born: 1947 (age 78–79) Şərur, Azerbaijan SSR, Soviet Union
- Party: Communist Party of Azerbaijan
- Education: Baku State University

Südaba Jamshid gizi Hasanova (Azerbaijani: Südabə Cəmşid qızı Həsənova; born 1947), is an Azerbaijani magistrate, the first female President of the Supreme Court and Minister of Justice. She is also a magistrate of the Constitutional Court.

== Biography ==
Hesenova was born in Şərur, nowadays part of the Nakhchivan Autonomous Republic. In 1971 graduated in Laws at the Baku State University.

== Career ==
Since 1971 and 1973, she worked as a consultant in the Department of Judicial Bodies of the Ministry of Justice of the Azerbaijani SSR. Since 1973, she has been a judge of the district court of the city of Baku.

In 1979, Hasanova was elected member of the Baku City Court and its Presidency. On 27 March 1980, Hasanova was elected a member of the Supreme Court of Justice of Azerbaijan. In November 1980, she was appointed to the position of instructor in the administrative division of the Central Committee of the Communist Party of Azerbaijan and worked there until 1987.

Hasanova was appointed to the post of First Deputy Minister of Justice of the Republic of Azerbaijan in April 1987.

Between 1995 and 1998 she was Minister of Justice of the Republic of Azerbaijan in the cabinet of Fuad Guliyev and Artur Rasizade.

Since December 1998, she was president of the Judicial and Legal Council of the President of the Republic of Azerbaijan. She was a member of the State Commission and its working group, the Legal Reform Commission, the pardon, education, health, anti-corruption and other state commissions that drafted the Constitution project of the Republic of Azerbaijan.

By decree of the President of the Republic of Azerbaijan of 18 April 2000, she was appointed President of the Supreme Court of the Republic of Azerbaijan until 19 April 2005.

By the decree of National Assembly of the Republic dated 23 December 2005, was appointed judge of the Constitutional Court, ceasing her office as judge of the Supreme Court.

== Honours ==
She was awarded the Order of Glory for his effective activity in judicially the decree of the President of the Republic of Azerbaijan of 5 February 2007.

On 3 February 2017, she was honored as "honorary lawyer".
