= Judicial–Legal Council (Azerbaijan) =

Judicial-Legal Council – is an institution of the Republic of Azerbaijan which:

- Organizes the judicial system and guarantees judicial independence,
- Organizes candidate selection for vacant judge positions,
- Evaluates judge's performance,
- Provides replacements for vacant positions and decides on promotions,
- Arranges disciplinary liability,
- Solves other issues related to judges and court's competence ·and
- Performs self-governance functions of the judicial power.

== History ==
The Judicial-Legal Council has been operating since February 2005. The council consists of 15 members including 9 judges, as well as other representatives of the government and representatives of the prosecutor's office. Together, the parties provide structure and advocacy in the judicial procedure.

The organization of initial and continuous training of judges, evaluation of the activity, the replacement of position, promotion, the arrangement of disciplinary liability and other activities related to their performance have been included to the authority of this institution.

The basis of the Judicial-Legal Council's activities are: the Constitution of the Republic of Azerbaijan; international agreements wherein the Republic of Azerbaijan is one of the parties; Laws of the Republic of Azerbaijan ‘On Judicial-Legal Council’, ‘On Courts and Judges’ and other normative legal acts of the Republic of Azerbaijan.

The Judicial-Legal Council is the permanent operating independent body; it does not depend organizationally or financially on legislative, executive and court bodies, local self-government institutions, or legal and physical people. The Judicial-Legal Council operates mutually with legislative, executive and court bodies, the Collegium of Advocates of Azerbaijan, scientific organizations.

== The Judicial-Legal Council Staff ==
The Judicial-Legal Council staff is established for organizational activities on preparation of meetings, holding the meeting minutes of the council, execution of decisions made by the council, as well as solving other issues related to authority of the board.

The status of the Judicial-Legal Council staff is accepted as equal to the status of the Supreme Court of the Republic of Azerbaijan. The staff operates according to the regulations approved by the Judicial-Legal Council. Judicial-Legal council staff members are public servants. The Judicial-Legal Council determines the structure and staff within the limits of the fund allocated from the state budget.

== Training Sector of the Judicial-Legal Council ==
Taking into account the importance of the judges’ training, Training Sector of Judges and State Prosecutors was established in 2007 under the Judicial-Legal Council consisting of high-level judges. It was based on international norms in this area.

Sector launched its operation in 2007, consisted of three judges of the courts from the higher instance and one prosecutor. Training by the sector is based on voluntary principle, the training program is compiled taking into account judges’ wishes as well.

Therefore, surveys are held while drafting training course program, areas and topics are known which need to be taught, programs on different areas are prepared on this basis.

Judges choose ongoing training course themselves which they want to participate on their calendar plan.

At the same time, according to the new legislation it is intended to involve judge candidates to the initial long-term training. The training program of this course, which runs throughout the year, is based on international experience, topics on human rights protection, judicial ethics, fight against corruption and other actual issues are included to the program.

In addition to increasing the theoretical knowledge of candidates for the judges within the framework of the course, they will also be trained in various courts.

Lectures of high instance court judges, outstanding scholars, experts with deep knowledge and experience are arranged during the course.

== Judges Selection Committee ==
Judges Selection Committee is formed in accordance with the law of Azerbaijan Republic ‘On the Judicial-Legal Council’ and ‘On Courts and Judges’, accept the documents of non-judge candidates for vacant positions, arrange written and oral examinations for admission to training courses in order to master this profession, involve candidates for the judge post to primary long-term courses, determine their suitability to the judge post through an interview.

== Duties of the Judicial-Legal Council ==
The Judicial-Legal Council has the following duties:

- Submits proposals to the relevant executive authority of the Republic of Azerbaijan on the organization of the courts (location, territorial jurisdiction and the total number of judges) ;
- Organizes the selection of candidates for judge posts;
- Evaluates judges’ performance, the organization of the judicial activity by chairman of the court, deputy of chairmen and chairmen of the judicial boards;
- Discusses issues on position change of judges, their promotion, extension of term of powers, appointment of chairman of courts of the Azerbaijan Republic, deputy of chairmen and chairman of judicial boards from appointed judges except chairmen of Supreme Court of the Republic of Azerbaijan, appeal courts, Supreme Court of Nakhchivan Autonomous Republic, The court of Grave Crimes. Dismissal of mentioned people or appointment to the other post is discussed as well;
- Calls the judge back to his position who has been sent on the official journey at the initiative of this judge or the institution where he has been sent;
- Takes measures for raising the level of professional skills of judges, preparation of candidates for judge positions;
- Carries out financial support of candidates for judge positions sent to primary long-term courses;
- Takes measures for ensuring independence of judges and prevention of outside interference in the courts’ performance;
- Provides legal and information support of judicial activity;
- Makes suggestions on material-technical supply and funding of the courts;
- Confirms the Ethics Code of Judges;
- Confirms card copies of judges;
- Reviews rewarding issues of judges and their disciplinary action;
- Reviews applications for termination of judges' power and criminal prosecution
- Terminates the powers of the judges in case of the first part of Article 113 of the Law of the Republic of Azerbaijan "On Courts and Judges", decides early termination of the powers of judges in case of the first and 3-5th point of the second part of Article 113 of the Law of the Republic of Azerbaijan "On Courts and Judges";
- Reviews applications and complaints, as well as complaints on decisions of Judges Selection Committee;
- Performs other duties defined by the legislation.

== See also ==
- Judiciary of Azerbaijan
