= Afandiyev =

Afandiyev (masculine, Azerbaijani: Əfəndiyev) or Afandiyeva (feminine, Azerbaijani: Əfəndiyeva) is an Azerbaijani surname. Notable people with the surname include:

- Elchin Afandiyev (1943–2025), Azerbaijani writer, academic and politician
- Ilyas Afandiyev (1914–1996), Azerbaijani Soviet writer
- Sultan Majid Afandiyev (1887–1938), Azerbaijani revolutionary and politician
- Narmin Afandiyeva (born 1993), Azerbaijani chemist
