= Law of Azerbaijan =

The legal system of Azerbaijan is based on civil law. As the country was a republic of the Soviet Union until 1991, its legal history has also been influenced heavily by socialist law. However, after the collapse of the Soviet Union, Azerbaijan became independent by enactment of the constitutional act of national independence on 18 October 1991. Azerbaijan adopted a Constitution in 1995, which is the foundation of the legislative system of the modern country.

Under the Constitution, there is nominally a system of presidential republic with a separation of powers among the Legislative, Executive, and Judicial branches of the government. However, power in Azerbaijan is firmly in the hands of the executive. The legislature is de facto powerless.

== Civil law ==
The term civil law in Azerbaijan refers to private law, which is opposed to the common law system of Criminal law and Civil law. The major body of statutes and laws governing civil law and procedure are set out in the Civil Code of Azerbaijan, established in December 1999. The contractual relations are based on the principle of contractual freedom.

== Criminal law ==
The current Criminal Code of Azerbaijan came into force in September 2000, replacing the older Criminal Code of 1960 which had been based on the principles of Soviet law. Article 1 of the Criminal Code states that "the Criminal legislation of the Republic of Azerbaijan consists of this Code. New laws defining criminal responsibility are subject to inclusion in this Code"; this is characteristic of civil law legal systems such as France and Italy. In 1998 Azerbaijan was the first country in the Orient to abolish the capital punishment.

== Sources of law ==
Unlike common law systems such as the United States and United Kingdom, Azerbaijani courts do not rely extensively on case law and judicial precedent. Except for decisions of the Constitutional Court of Azerbaijan, decisions of the courts are not usually counted as a source of law. The sources of law in the Azerbaijani legal system are:

- The Constitution of Azerbaijan.
- Acts adopted via referendum.
- Laws passed by the National Assembly of Azerbaijan, Azerbaijan's legislature.
- Decrees.
- Resolutions of the Cabinet of Ministers.
- International treaties to which Azerbaijan is a party.

== Judicial system ==
The Supreme Court of Azerbaijan is a supreme judicial body on civil, criminal, and other cases related to the execution of general and specialized courts. The Constitutional Court of Azerbaijan is the supreme body of constitutional justice on the matters attributed to its jurisdiction by the Constitution, with authority to interpret and apply the Constitution of Azerbaijan.

== Legal reforms ==
After gaining of independence Azerbaijani legal system has undergone fundamental reforms. An important part of the legal reforms in the country is related to adoption of a new Constitution in Azerbaijan in 1995. Since that Constitution was amended three times in 2002, 2009 and 2016. Adoption of the Constitution has been followed by reforms related to progressive legislative acts such as, "The Law on the Constitutional court", "The Law on Courts and Judges", "The Law on Police", "The Law on Operational-Investigational Activity", the Law Judicial Legal Council, Criminal and Civil Procedure Codes, etc. Moreover, there have been made a number of amendments to the Civil Code, the Code of Civil Procedure, the Criminal Code, the Code of Criminal Procedure, etc.

Legal reforms introduced a new three-stage - first instance, appellate and supreme court system in Azerbaijan and ensured its independence from other branches of power. At present, there are district (city) courts acts as the first degree of jurisdictional courts, military courts, and local administrative-economic courts as territorial jurisdictional courts, also Court of Azerbaijan Republic on Felonies and the Court of Azerbaijan on Grave Military Crimes.

The Supreme Court of Azerbaijan Republic is cassation degree of jurisdiction and consists of 5 chambers: the Civil Chamber, the Criminal Chamber, the Military Chamber, and the Administrative and Commercial Chamber. Court hearings are public, and defendants are free to choose their own attorney and have the right to appeal the verdict. In cases involving national security or other defined by law a judge may decide to hold a closed trial.

Azerbaijan, as a member of the Council of Europe ratificated European Convention on Human Rights . Further, Azerbaijani individuals, group of individuals and non-governmental organisations can refer cases to the ECHR.

For law news or legal reform updates, you may follow government websites, or websites of law firms in Azerbaijan.

== See also ==
Judiciary of Azerbaijan

Constitution of Azerbaijan

Constitutional Court of Azerbaijan

The most comprehensive source of legislative acts of Azerbaijan
