= Conscription in Azerbaijan =

Azerbaijan has mandatory military service in the Azerbaijani Armed Forces for all able-bodied male civilians. Conscription is at the age of 18. According to Article 76.2 of the Constitution of Azerbaijan, if a citizen's conscience prevents them from serving, alternative service other than military service is not available. Women between the ages of 19 and 40 are also accepted into the armed forces on a voluntary basis. There are four call-up periods per year. The length of military service is 18 months, the compulsory service period is reduced from 18 to 12 months for university graduates.

== Initial military registration of citizens ==
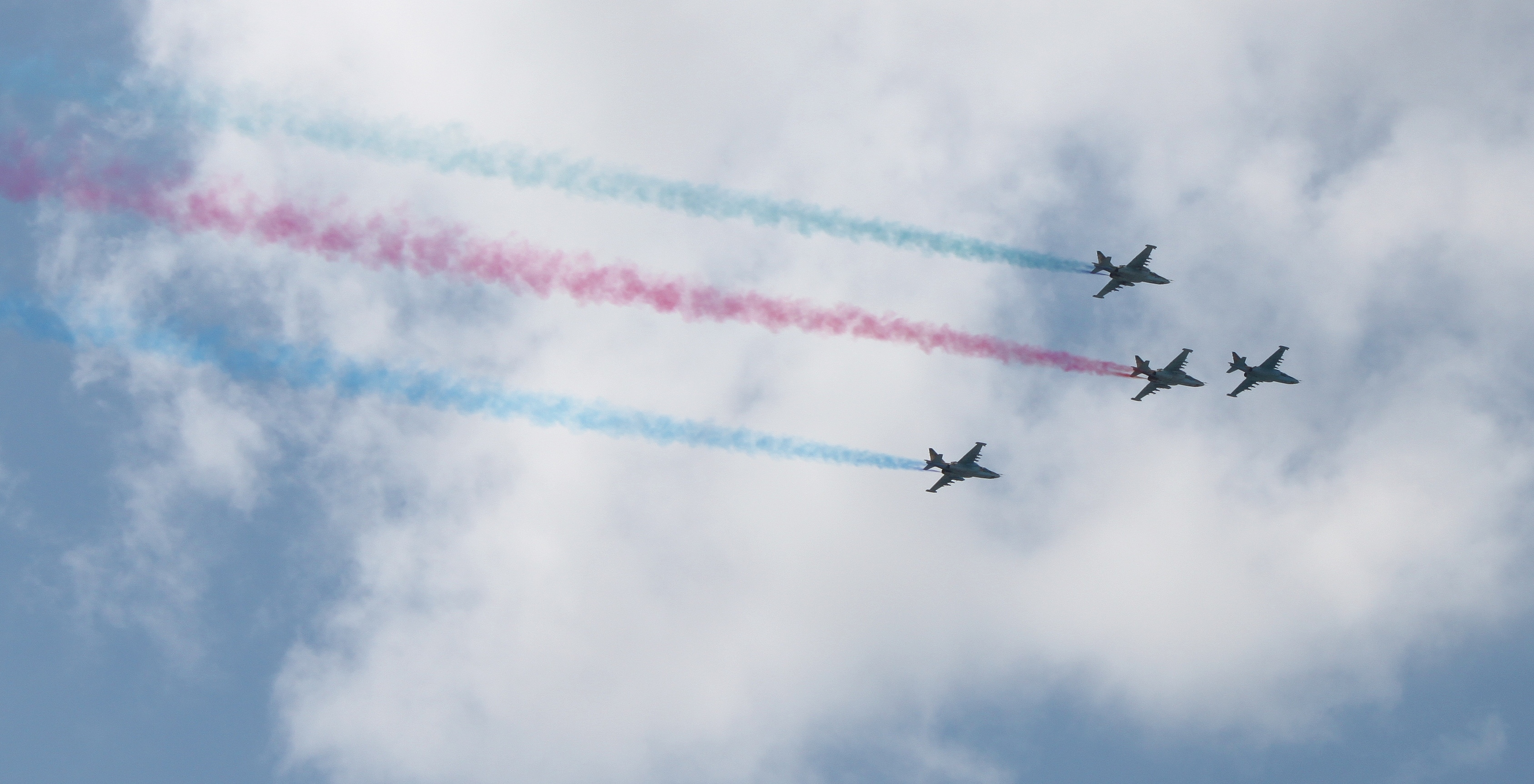
Azerbaijani Air and Air Defence Force 2011.

Military registration commissions consisting of the chairman of the commission (head of relevant executive authority) and commission members (medical specialists) are established every year. From January to March, male citizens who have reached the age of the 16 must be registered in the relevant military authority and undergo medical examinations. Citizens with a short-term health problem must send to medical institutions for treatment at the expense of the state budget.

== Preparing citizens for military service ==
=== Pre-conscription training ===
Pre-conscription training in Azerbaijan is held in educational institutions. Basic military knowledge is also taught to citizens in parallel with their school lessons.

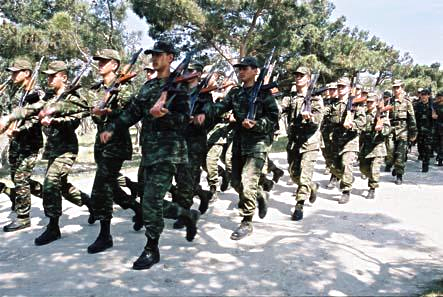

=== Training on military occupational specialty ===
The citizens who have reached the age of 17 can get training on military occupational specialty in educational institutions. The citizens who want to receive this training must leave their jobs, but they get a salary every month without working during the period of training. And at the end of the training they may return their workplace.

== Military service deferment ==
=== Permanent deferment ===
The following categories of citizens are not required to serve in the armed forces of Azerbaijan:

- Individuals with a doctoral degree (PhD)
- People with serious health problems, including the mentally ill
- Citizens who arrested for committing a grave crime
- Being in preventive and operation registration in the police department

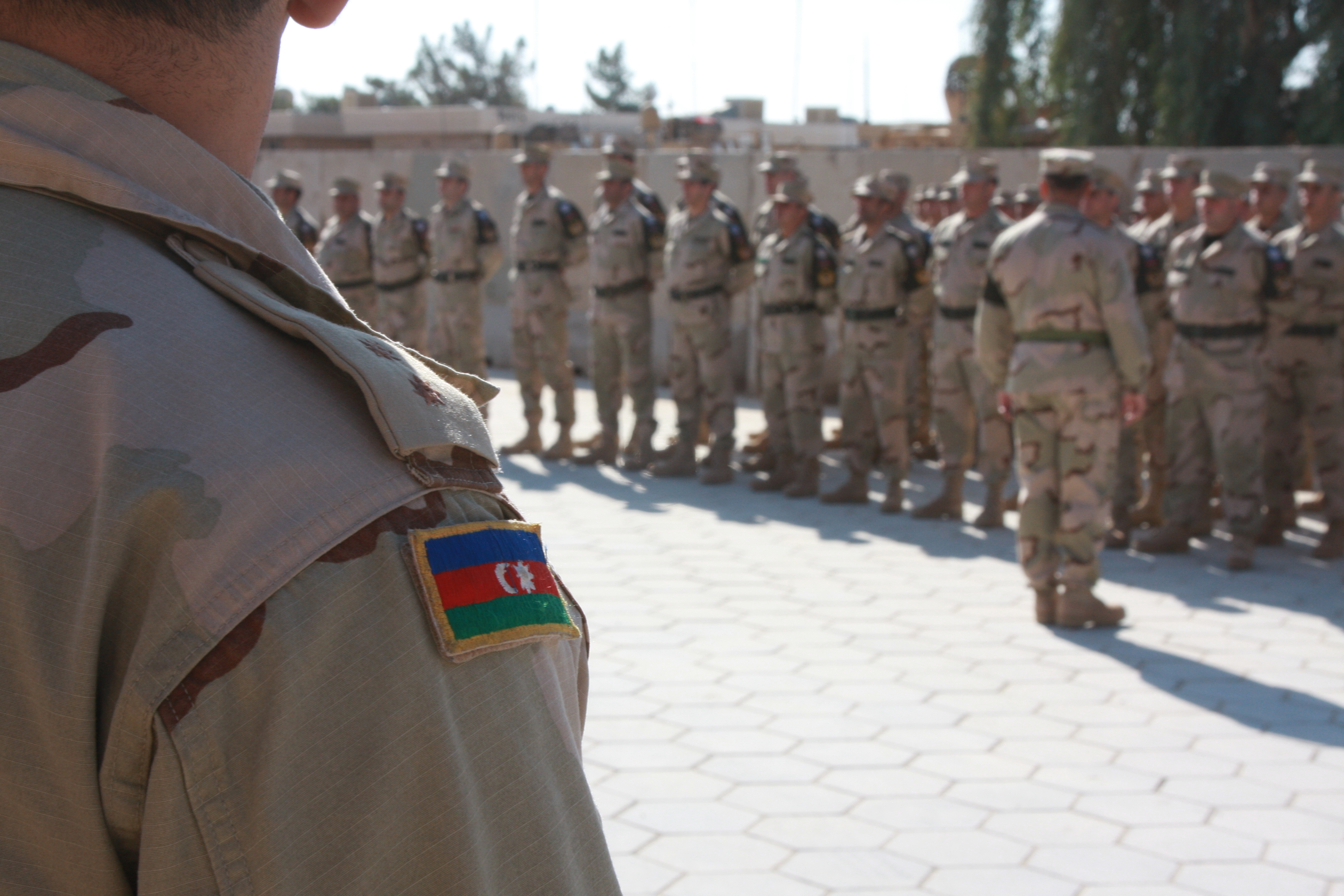
Azerbaijani army soldiers assigned to the 1st Azerbaijani Peacekeeping Company, stand in formation during a ceremony recognizing their contribution to Operation Iraqi Freedom at Camp Ripper, Asad, Iraq, Dec. 3, 2008.

=== Temporary deferment ===
Temporary deferment can be given for the following reasons:

==== Due to the family situation ====
- Fathers whose wife is incapable of work and whose children cannot support themselves
- The eldest son in a family whose members cannot support themselves
- Fathers of more than three children
- The single son in the family one of whose parents is incapable of work

==== Due to health problems ====
- Citizens with short-term health problems detected during medical examination are given postponements

==== For continuing education ====
- To citizens under the age of 20 who are undergoing full-time secondary education in general education institutions
- To citizens under the age of 20 who have not completed full-time secondary education until they enter the institutions of primary function of vocational education
- To citizens who are studying higher education (Bachelor's degree), or higher education for medical education and residency education (until graduation) in the institutions and their branches
- To citizens who are studying in foreign countries in higher education (bachelor's degree), higher education for medical education, and education in residency (internship) until completion of their education

== Military ranks ==
Military ranks are given to military personnel according to their military position, military education, military service duration, and some other features.

The following military ranks are defined:

| Military personnel and Military service | Military ranks | |
| Military personnel and Military service | Land Force | Military Navy |
| Soldiers and Seamans | Private Private first class | Seaman Seaman 1st Class |
| The sergeants | Corporal Sergeant Staffsergeant | Petty Officer 3rd Class Petty Officer 2nd Class Pettyofficer, 1st class |
| Warrant officers | Master sergeant Warrant officer Chief warrant officer | Chief petty officer Warrant officer Chief warrant officer |
| Lieutenants | Junior Lieutenant Lieutenant Senior Lieutenant Captain | Junior Lieutenant Lieutenant Senior Lieutenant Captain Lieutenant |
| Senior Officers | Major LieutenantColonel Colonel | Captain 3rd Class Captain 2nd Class Captain 1st Class |
| High Officers | Major General Lieutenant General Colonel General Army General | Rear Admiral Vice Admiral Admiral |

== See also ==
- Azerbaijani Armed Force
- Military ranks insignia of Azerbaijan Land Force
- Military ranks insignia of Azerbaijan Air Force
- Military ranks insignia of Azerbaijan Navy
