= Ministry of Justice (Azerbaijan) =

Government ministry of Azerbaijan

Ministry of Justice of Azerbaijan
- Azərbaycan Respublikasının Ədliyyə Nazirliyi
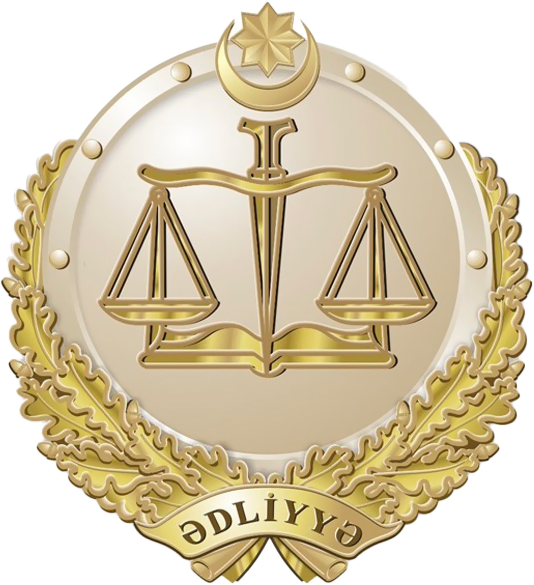
- Logo of the Ministry of Justice

Agency overview
- Formed: November 22, 1918
- Jurisdiction: Government of Azerbaijan
- Headquarters: Inshaatchilar ave. 1, Baku, Azerbaijan Republic
- Agency executive: Farid Ahmadov, Minister of Justice of Azerbaijan
- Website: justice.gov.az

The Ministry of Justice of Azerbaijan (Azerbaijani: Azərbaycan Respublikasının Ədliyyə Nazirliyi) is a governmental agency within the Cabinet of Azerbaijan in charge of regulation of the justice system, overseeing the public prosecutor, maintaining the legal system and public order and instituting law reforms.

== History ==
The Ministry of Justice was one of the first ministries of Azerbaijan Democratic Republic established on May 28, 1918, the day of declaration of independence of Azerbaijan. Its statute was ratified by the National Assembly of Azerbaijan on November 22, 1918. After the occupation of the Azerbaijan Democratic Republic by the 11th Army of Soviet Russia in May 1920 the Ministry of Justice was abolished, and by the decision of the Azerbaijan Revolutionary Committee the People's Commissariat of Justice was established instead.

In 1930, the Commissariat was liquidated, all its competencies were transferred to the Supreme Court, the Central Executive Committee, the prosecutor's office and other bodies.

In 1933, the People's Commissariat of Justice was reorganized, and it was responsible for drafting bills, interpreting laws, training judicial personnel, providing legal assistance to the population, penitentiary system management, and so on.

In 1937, the new Statute of the People's Commissariat of Justice was approved. As a consequence, the powers of the People's Commissariat of Justice were significantly limited.

In 1959, the Ministry of Justice was abolished again, and the management of all the operations of the Judiciary was transferred to the Supreme Court.

The second birthday of the Ministry of Justice of the Azerbaijan SSR is considered to be October 27, 1970, when Heydar Aliyev came to power in the republic.

By presidential decree of November 11, 2000, the day of the approval of the first Regulation of the Ministry of Justice (November 22) was declared a professional day for the judicial officials.

The new "Statute of the Ministry of Justice" was approved by the Presidential Decree of April 18, 2006 in order to modernize the legal basis of the ministry and bring it in line with international standards.

== Structure ==
The ministry manages the state policies and management in the field of justice through its legal expertise, record keeping and state registration of legal acts. It also takes part in development of legislation, drafting laws, formulating proposals on draft legal acts and providing legal awareness. The ministry also oversees the state registration of legal entities, maintaining register of publications. Notary activities, registering of civil status acts, intergovernmental matters on adoption, legalization of documents also fall within the scope of the ministry's activity. Furthermore, the agency is in charge of enforcement of judicial decisions, organizational provision of the courts, gathering judicial data as well as registration of grant agreements to be allocated to the non-profit organizations. The ministry is currently headed by Farid Ahmadov appointed in February 2024.

=== List of the functions of the Ministry ===
- Participates in the formation of uniform state policy in the field of justice and ensures the implementation of this policy;
- Ensures the development of the judiciary;
- Conducts law-enforcement;
- Prepares draft legislative acts, conducts legal examination of normative legal acts and state registration;
- Ensures activities of notary;
- Carries out state registration of non-commercial legal entities, representations and branches of foreign non-commercial legal entities;
- Implements a single data registry of inspections carried out in the field of entrepreneurship;
- Carries out the State Register of the population of the Republic of Azerbaijan;
- Provides support to the operations of the courts, penitentiary institutions and municipalities in accordance with the legislation;
- Carries out legal research and studies;
- Ensures fulfillment of commitments undertaken by the Republic of Azerbaijan, regulated by international agreements of the Republic of Azerbaijan;
- Operates in other directions defined by the legislation.

== Organization ==
The Ministry of Justice is headed by the Minister of Justice, who has three deputies, as well as the head of the Penitentiary Service.

The structure of the Ministry of Justice of Azerbaijan includes:

Administration of the Ministry:

- Directorate General for Strategic planning and monitoring
- Directorate General for Legislation
- Directorate General for Notary, registration and registry
- Compulsory Enforcement directorate (authorized directorate general)
- Probation service (authorized directorate general)
- Directorate General for International cooperation
- Directorate General for Municipalities affairs
- Directorate General for Penal enforcement inspectorate
- Investigation department
- Human resources department
- Department for document circulation and citizens' appeals
- Department for digitization and innovations in justice
- Department for finance and maintenance
- Press department

Judicial bodies and organizations within the Ministry:

- Penitentiary service (authorized directorate general)
- Judicial Academy (authorized directorate general)
- Forensic Expertise Center (authorized directorate general)
- Main Medical Department
- Regional, local and other organizations

== List of ministers ==
=== Azerbaijan Democratic Republic (1918–1920) ===
- Khalil bey Khasmammadov (1918)
- Fatali Khan Khoyski (1918)
- Teymur bey Makinski (1918–1919)
- Aslan Bey Sefikürdski (1919)
- Khalil bey Khasmammadov (1919–1920)

=== Azerbaijan Republic (1992–present) ===
- Alisaab Orujov (1991–1992)
- Ilyas Ismayilov (1992–1995)
- Südaba Hasanova (1995–2000)
- Fikrat Mammadov (2000–2024)
- Farid Ahmadov (2024-present)

== See also ==
- Cabinet of Azerbaijan
- Judiciary of Azerbaijan
- Justice ministry
- Azərbaycan Ədliyyə Nazirləri (Ministers of Justice of Azerbaijan)
- Politics of Azerbaijan
