= Constitutional Court of Azerbaijan =

Government entity of Azerbaijan

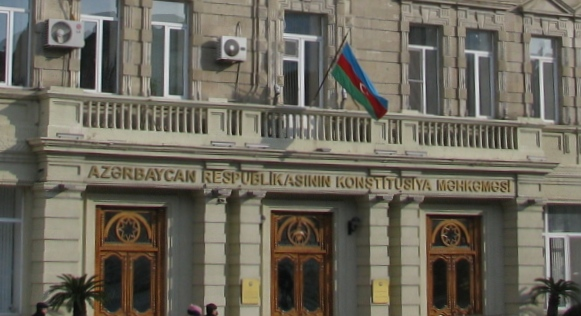
Constitutional Court of Azerbaijan

The Constitutional Court of the Republic of Azerbaijan (Azerbaijani: Azərbaycan Respublikasının Konstitusiya Məhkəməsi) is a state body of the Republic of Azerbaijan whose jurisdiction is defined by the Constitution of Azerbaijan.

The Constitutional Court interprets the Constitution and laws of Azerbaijan based on petitions submitted by the President of Azerbaijan, the Milli Majlis, the Cabinet of Ministers, the Supreme Court, the Prosecutor General's Office, and the Supreme Assembly of the Nakhchivan Autonomous Republic.

== Overview ==
The stated purpose of the court is to safeguard the Constitution of Azerbaijan and protect the fundamental rights and freedoms of individuals. The President of Azerbaijan, Milli Majlis, Cabinet of Ministers, Supreme Court of Azerbaijan, Prosecutor's Office of Azerbaijan, Ali Majlis of Nakhichevan Autonomous Republic, Courts, Individuals and Ombudsman may apply to Constitutional Court according to Constitution of Azerbaijan. The Constitutional Court can examine individual complaints by any person who alleges that his/her rights and freedoms have been violated by the normative legal act of the legislative and executive, the acts adopted by municipality or a court.

== Composition ==
The president of Azerbaijan appoints the chairman and deputy chairman of Constitutional Court. The Constitutional Court was established on 14 July 1998. It is composed of 9 judges, appointed by the Milli Majlis upon recommendation of the president of the Republic. The judges are appointed for a period of 15 years, without possibility to be re-appointed to the same post.

Current composition:

- Farhad Abdullayev
- Humay Afandiyeva
- Fikrat Mammadov
- Isa Najafov
- Khanlar Valiyev
- Rashid Rzayev
- Otari Gvaladze
- Farhad Tutayuk
- Rauf Guliyev

== See also ==
- Politics of Azerbaijan
- Judiciary of Azerbaijan
