= Farhad Abdullayev =

Azerbaijani lawyer (born 1958)

- Fərhad Abdullayev

Chairman of the Constitutional Court of the Azerbaijan Republic
- Incumbent
- Assumed office 25 June 2003
- Preceded by: Khanlar Hajiyev

Personal details
- Born: 5 December 1958 (age 67) Baku, Azerbaijan SSR, Soviet Union
- Education: Moscow State University
- Awards: Honored Lawyer of the Republic of Azerbaijan; Shohrat Order; Azerbaijan Democratic Republic 100th anniversary medal; Order of Friendship (Kazakhstan)

Farhad Sahib oghlu Abdullayev (Azerbaijani: Fərhad Sahib oğlu Abdullayev; born 5 December 1958) is an Azerbaijani lawyer currently serving as Chairman of the Constitutional Court of the Republic of Azerbaijan since 2003.

== Biography ==
Farhad Abdullayev was born 5 December 1958 in Baku. In 1965 he entered the secondary school No. 189 in Baku and graduated from the same school in 1975. From 1975 to 1980, he studied at the Faculty of Law at the Moscow State University named after M. V. Lomonosov.

In 1980, Abdullayev was appointed by postgraduate work assignment to the Supreme Court of the Republic of Azerbaijan. He started his work as Adviser then as Senior Adviser, and in 1985 he was appointed to the post of Head of Department of Supreme Court. In 1990 he was elected to the post of the Judge of the Supreme Court of the Republic of Azerbaijan by the Supreme Council of the Republic of Azerbaijan and remained on this post till 2000. On 28 August 2000, he was appointed as a Deputy Chairman of the Court of Appeal of the Republic of Azerbaijan.

After the approval of Milli Majlis (Parliament) of the Republic of Azerbaijan, by the Decree of the President of the Republic of Azerbaijan dated of 25 June 2003, Farhad Abdullayev was appointed to the post of Chairman of the Constitutional Court of the Republic of Azerbaijan.

After the approval of Milli Majlis (Parliament) of the Republic of Azerbaijan, by the Order of the President of the Republic of Azerbaijan dated of 24 June 2013, he was reappointed to the post of Chairman of the Constitutional Court of the Republic of Azerbaijan.

Along with participation in the implementation of justice in the Republic of Azerbaijan, he took direct part in drafting of a number of legislative and other acts.

Abdullayev is engaged in pedagogical and scientific activities. He is a Doctor of Law. He is the Chairman of the Specialized Council for the defense of master's theses in "Jurisprudence" and "International Law" at Baku State University and the Chairman of the Specialized Scientific Council for the master's level in the specialty of Jurisprudence at the Academy of Public Administration under the President of the Republic of Azerbaijan. At the same time, he is a member of the Dissertation Council ED 2.45 of the Higher Attestation Commission under the President of the Republic of Azerbaijan, operating at the National Aviation Academy.

He is a member of the Commission on Combating Corruption of the Republic of Azerbaijan.

He is married and has two children.

== Awards ==
- The Order of the President of the Republic of Azerbaijan on awarding with a title "The Honoured Lawyer", 16 July 2009.
- The Order of the President of the Republic of Azerbaijan on awarding "Shohrat" Order, 5 December 2018.
- The Order of the President of the Republic of Azerbaijan on awarding the jubilee medal "100th Anniversary of the Azerbaijan Democratic Republic (1918-2018)", 27 May 2019.
- The Decree of the President of the Republic of Kazakhstan on awarding "Достык" (Friendship) Order of the II degree for services in strengthening cooperation between states, 12 August 2020.

== Publications ==
1. "Apellyasiya Məhkəməsində cinayət mühakimə icraatının təkmilləşdirilməsi problemləri" 2005-ci il ("Problems of improvement of criminal proceedings in the Court of Appeal", 2005)
2. "Azərbaycan Respublikasında Konstitusiya icraatının nəzəri və praktiki problemləri" 2009-cu il ("Conceptual and practical problems of constitutional proceedings in the Republic of Azerbaijan", 2009)
3. "Azərbaycan Respublikası Konstitusiya Məhkəməsinin Hüquqi Mövqeləri" 2013-cü il ("Legal positions of the Constitutional Court of the Republic of Azerbaijan", 2013)
4. "Azərbaycan Respublikası Konstitusiya Məhkəməsinin Hüquqi Mövqeləri" 2018-ci il (2 hissəli) ("Legal positions of the Constitutional Court of the Republic of Azerbaijan ", 2018 (2 parts))
5. "Legal Positions of the Constitutional Court of the Republic of Azerbaijan" 2018 (Eng)
6. "Azərbaycan Respublikası Konstitusiya Məhkəməsinin Hüquqi Mövqeləri" 2023-ci il (3 hissəli) ("Legal positions of the Constitutional Court of the Republic of Azerbaijan ", 2023 (3 parts))
