= Khanlar Hajiyev =

Azerbaijan judge

Judge of the European Court of Human Rights in respect of Azerbaijan
- Incumbent
- Assumed office April 2003

2nd President of the Supreme Court
- In office 1993 – 18 April 2003
- Preceded by: Office established
- Succeeded by: Südabe Hesenova

Personal details
- Born: 9 September 1956 (age 69) Ganja, Azerbaijan

Khanlar Hajiyev (9 September 1956) is an Azerbaijan judge, and former Judge of the European Court of Human Rights in respect of Azerbaijan.

== Education ==
- 2001 Doctor of Law
- Postgraduate training in Epidemiological Surveillance and Diseases Management
- 1983 Postgraduate course at the Faculty of Law of Moscow State University
- Moscow Institute of State and Law of the Academy of Science, Institute of Philosophy and Law of the Academy of Science of Azerbaijan

== Career ==
- Judge of the European Court of Human Rights nominated from Azerbaijan elected in 2003-2017
- 1998-2003 Chairman of the Constitutional Court of Azerbaijan
- 1993-1998 Chairman of the Supreme Court of Azerbaijan
- 1996-2001 Full-fledged member of the European Commission for Democracy through Law of the Council of Europe (Venice Commission)
- 1992-1993 First Vice-president of the Supreme Court of Azerbaijan
- 1993-2001 Lecturer at the Baku State University on the Legal Aspects of the Struggle against International Criminality
- 1988-1990 Senior Adviser at the Supreme Court of USSR
- 1985-1988 Editor of the Penal Law and Penal Procedure Department of the Soviet Justice Journal
- 1983-1985 Adviser of the Supreme Court of USSR

== Selected works ==
=== Books ===
- The Interpretation of the Provisions of Constitution and Law by Constitutional Courts -Author: Khanlar Hajiyev -Publisher: Baku : Ozan, 2002

== See also ==
- List of judges of the European Court of Human Rights
