= Chamber of Auditors of the Republic of Azerbaijan =

Chamber of Auditors
- Auditorlar Palatası

Agency overview
- Formed: September 16, 1994
- Jurisdiction: Government of Azerbaijan
- Headquarters: Baku, Azerbaijan
- Agency executive: Novruzov Vahid Tapdig
- Website: Official website

The Chamber of Auditors of the Republic of Azerbaijan is an Azerbaijani government agency responsible for oversight of the state finances.

== History ==
The Azerbaijani law “On Auditor Services was signed by President Heydar Aliyev on the 16th of September 1994. In 1995, the National Assembly (Milli Mejlis) of the Republic of Azerbaijan made a decision on regulations about the Chamber. The Chamber of Auditors began operations on the 5th of April 1996. The first issue of the journal titled “Economics and Auditing” was published on July 5, 2000.

Its chairman is Novruzov Vahid Tapdig, the deputy chairman is Isamyilov Fakhraddin Hasan, and the head of the office is Bayramov Gasham Hajali.
