= Farid Ahmadov =

Azerbaijani lawyer

- Fərid Əhmədov

Minister of Justice
- Incumbent
- Assumed office 27 February 2024
- President: Ilham Aliyev
- Preceded by: Fikrat Mammadov

Deputy Minister of Digital Development and Transportation
- In office 24 May 2022 – 27 February 2024
- Minister: Rashad Nabiyev

Personal details
- Born: 14 July 1979 Baku, Azerbaijan SSR, USSR
- Education: Baku State University, University of Essex, Academy of Public Administration (Azerbaijan), University of Oxford

Farid Turab oghlu Ahmadov (Azerbaijani: Fərid Turab oğlu Əhmədov; born 14 July 1979) is an Azerbaijani lawyer serving as the Minister of Justice of the Azerbaijan Republic since 27 February 2024.

He previously served as a deputy minister and an adviser to the Minister of Digital Development and Transportation.

== Education ==
He graduated from Baku State University's law faculty with bachelor's (2000) and master's degrees (2002).

Received a master's degree in International Human Rights from the University of Essex in the United Kingdom under the Chevening scholarship program (2003).

In 2009, Ahmadov successfully defended his thesis at the Academy of Public Administration and earned his PhD in law by the decision of the Higher Attestation Commission.

He finished his PhD in law at University of Oxford (2017) under the Weidenfeld scholarship program, intending to play a "significant role in Azerbaijan by introducing fundamental reforms to the judiciary and instilling the rule of law".

== Career ==
Ahmadov has engaged in academic activities in Baku State University, Oxford University, ADA University, and served as a rector at Azerbaijan University from 2015 to 2017.

He began his law career in 2000 and worked in various positions at the Constitutional Court Apparatus from 2004 to 2006 and at the National Assembly (Azerbaijan) Apparatus from 2006 to 2007.

He held the post of Deputy General Director of the “Baku International Sea Trade Port” CJSC from 2017 to 2020.

In 2021, Ahmadov became an adviser to the Minister of Digital Development and Transportation, and in 2022, he was appointed Deputy Minister of Digital Development and Transport under the decree of the President of the Republic of Azerbaijan.

From 2023 to 2024 he served as a member, general speaker and bureau member of the UN Human Rights Committee.

Ahmadov was appointed Minister of Justice of the Republic of Azerbaijan, by the decree of the President of Republic of Azerbaijan on February 27, 2024.

== Books ==
"The Right of Actio Popularis before International Courts and Tribunals". Published by Brill Publishers in 2018. Solo author.
