= Humay Afandiyeva =

Azerbaijani judge (born 1975)

- Humay Əfəndiyeva

Judge of the Constitutional Court of Azerbaijan
- Incumbent
- Assumed office 1 February 2021

Personal details
- Born: 7 December 1975 (age 50) Baku, Azerbaijani SSR, Soviet Union
- Children: 2
- Relatives: Elchin Afandiyev (father)
- Education: Baku State University; University of Western Ontario

Humay Afandiyeva (Azerbaijani: Humay Əfəndiyeva; born 7 December 1975) is an Azerbaijani jurist. She has been judge of the Constitutional Court of Azerbaijan since 2021.

== Early life and education ==
Afandiyeva was born on 7 December 1975 in Baku, Azerbaijani SSR, then-Soviet Union, as the daughter of writer and politician Elchin Afandiyev. She graduated with a degree from the Faculty of International Law and International Relations at Baku State University in 1997 and from the Faculty of Social and Political Administration at University of Western Ontario in Canada. She holds a doctorate in law.

== Career ==
After completing her studies, in 1997 she began working as a public relations adviser for the UNDP’s ‘Gender in Development’ project, a role she held until 2000. Between 2001 and 2021, she served as an adviser to the Vice-President of the Constitutional Court of Azerbaijan, as well as Deputy Head of the Department of International Law and International Relations and Head of the Department of Criminal and Administrative Law.

On 1 February 2021 the National Assembly approved her nomination to become judge of the Constitutional Court and was sworn in that day.

== Personal life ==
She have two children.
