= Military ranks of Azerbaijan =

The Military ranks of Azerbaijan are the military insignia used by the Azerbaijani Armed Forces.Being a former member of Soviet Union, Azerbaijan shares a rank structure similar to that of Russia; however, the insignia used for its ranks has been increasingly influenced by Turkey.

== Commissioned officer ranks ==
The rank insignia of commissioned officers.

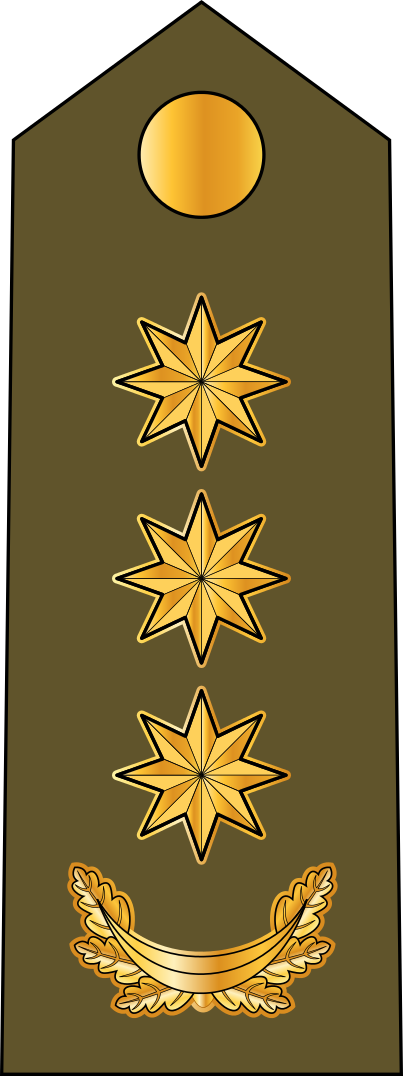
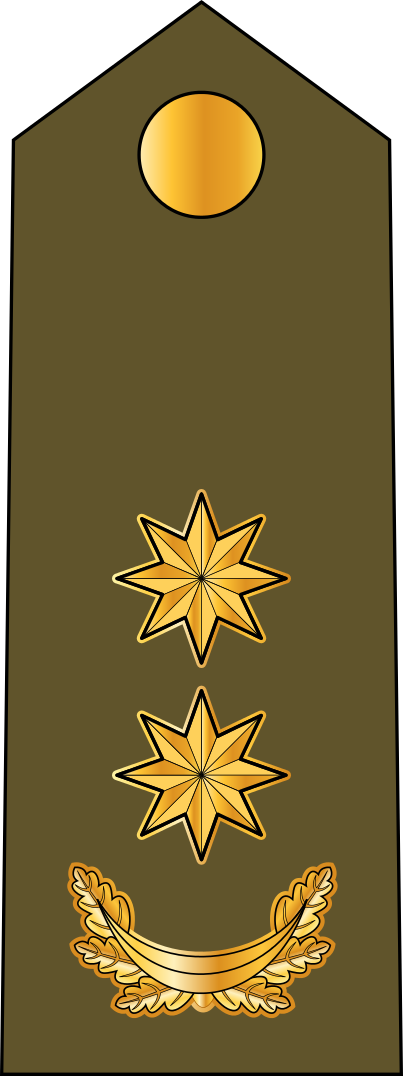
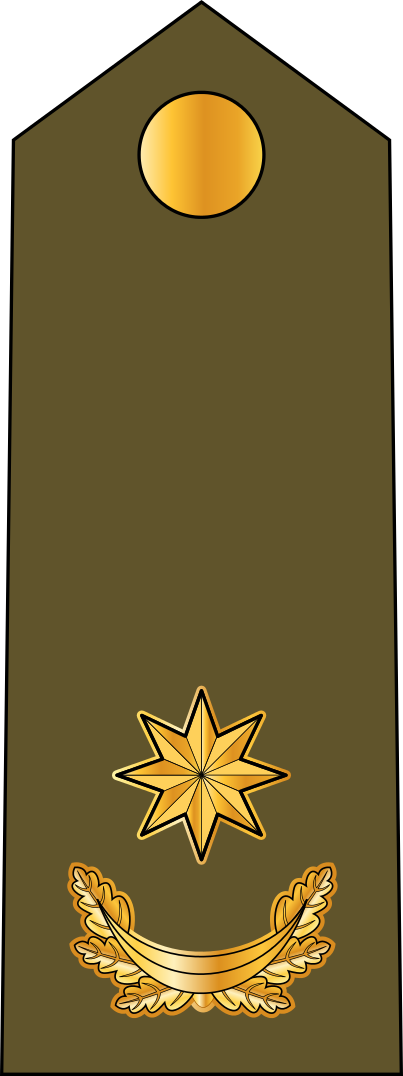
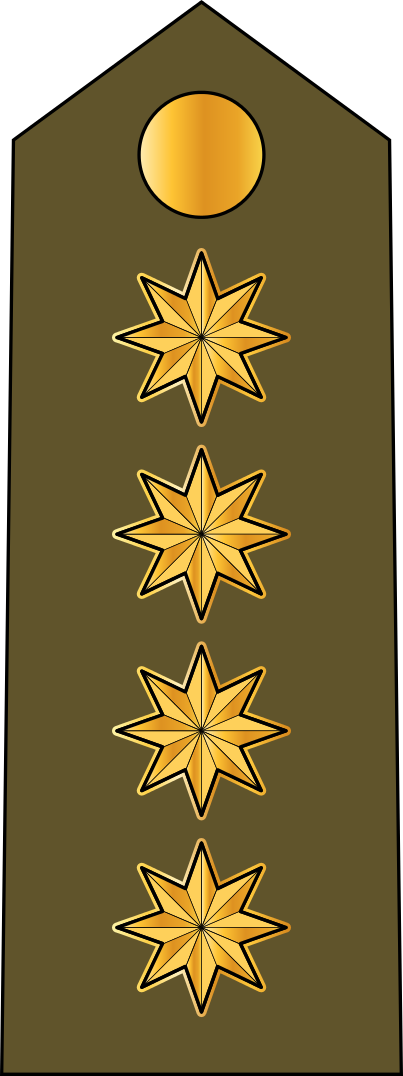
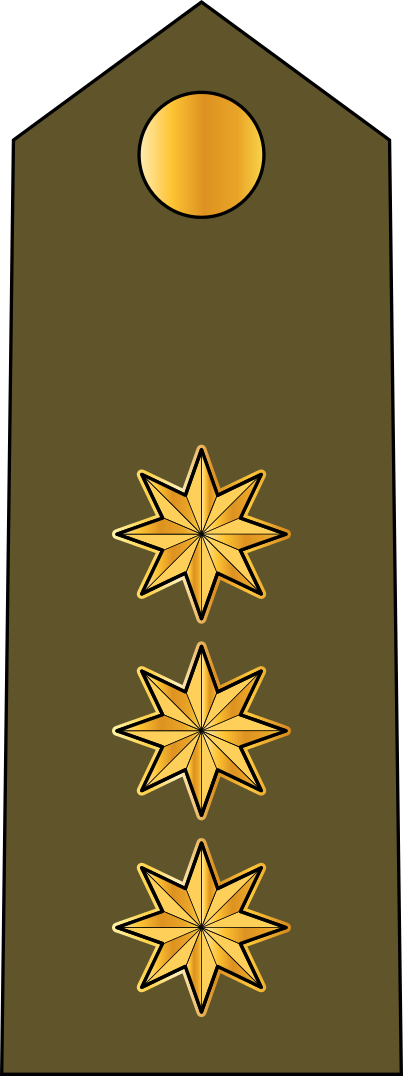
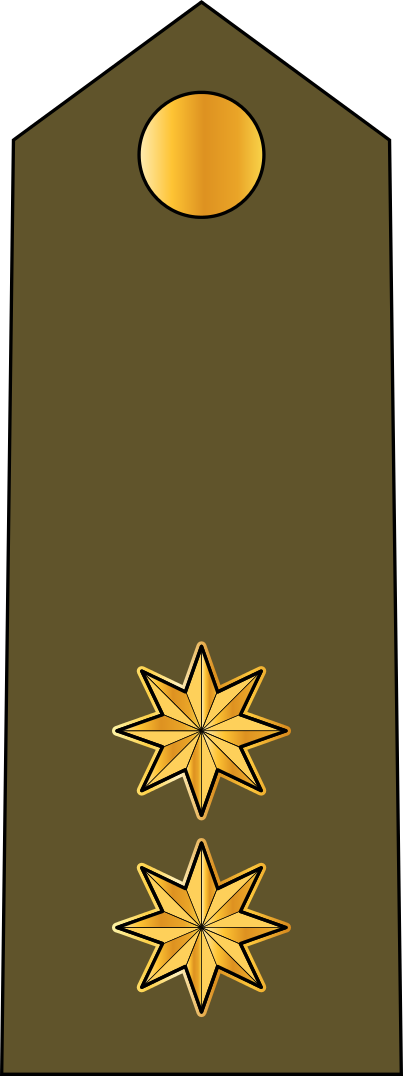
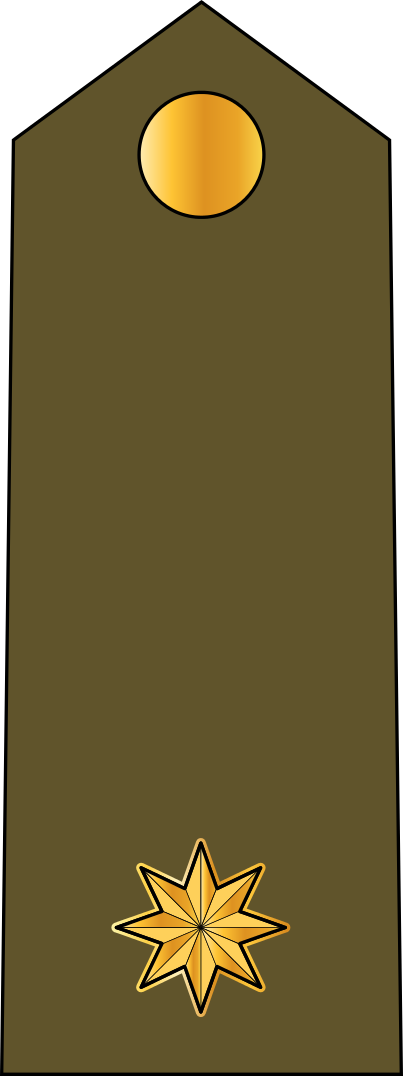
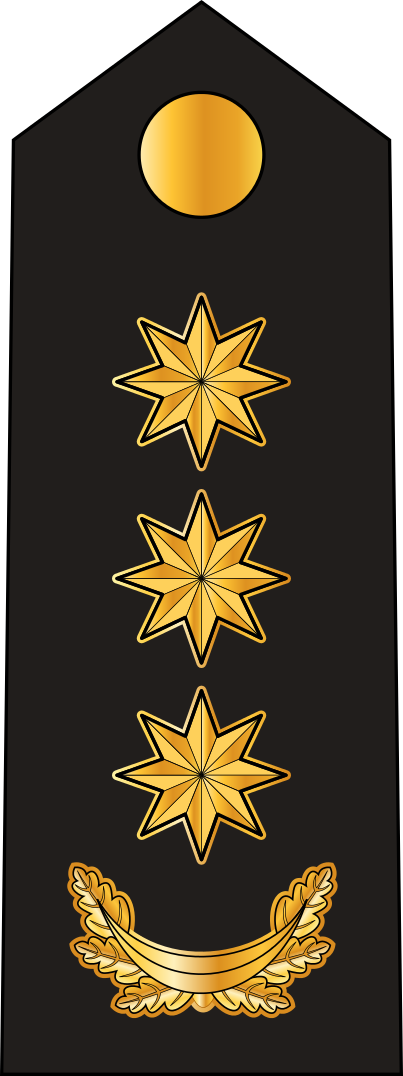
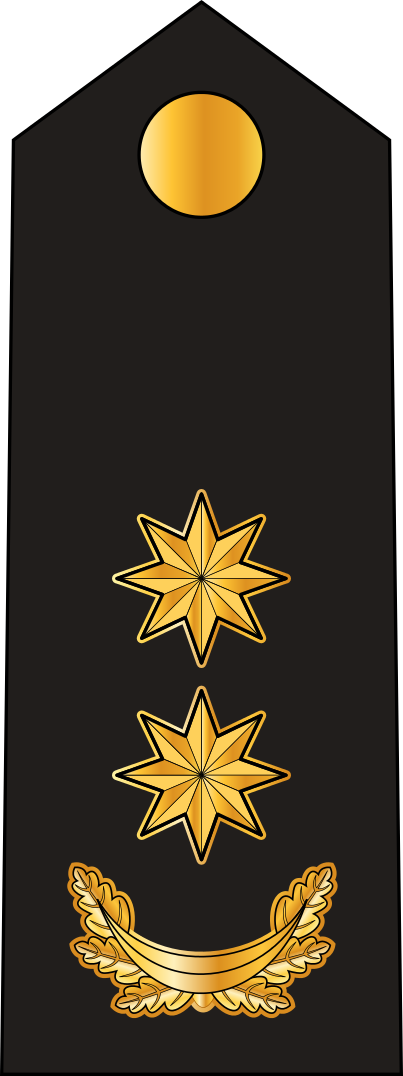
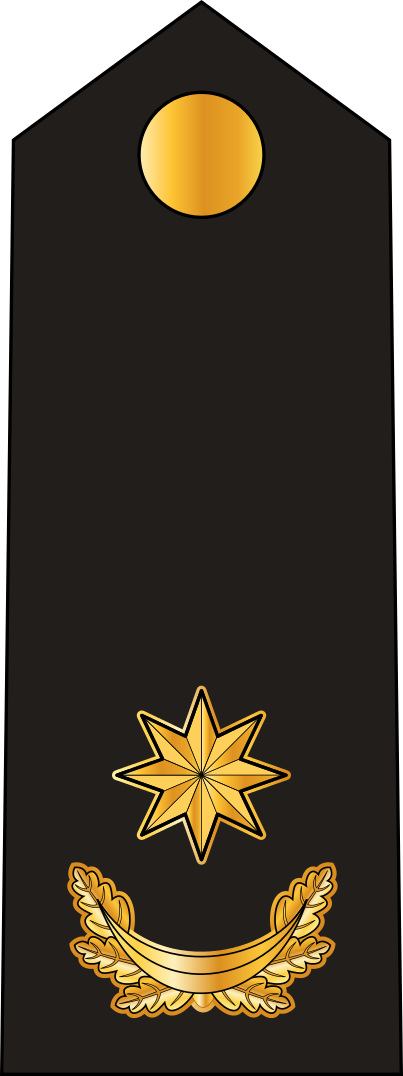
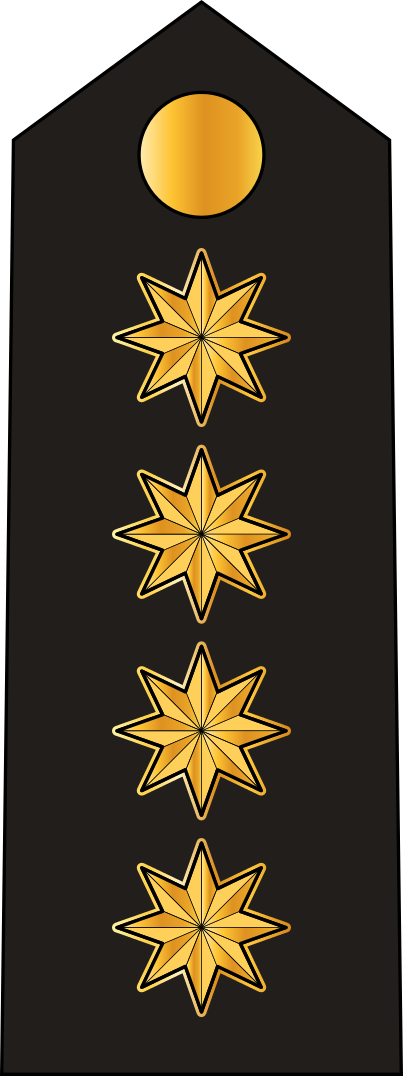
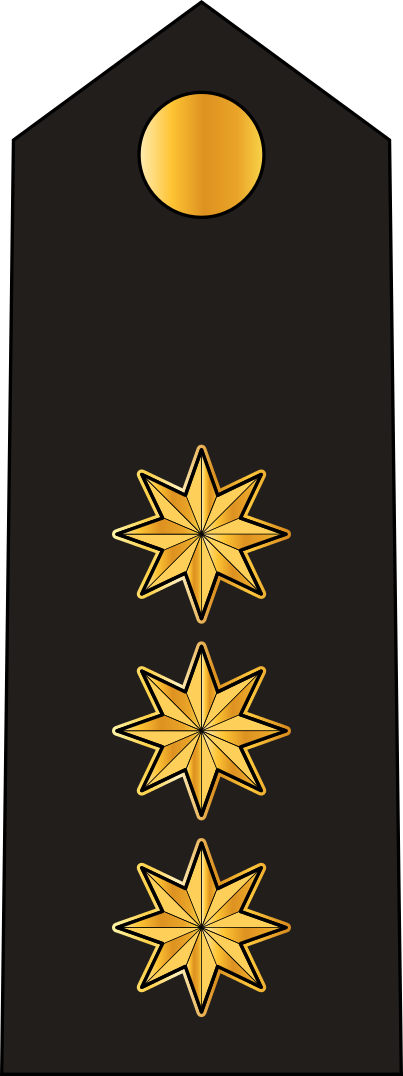
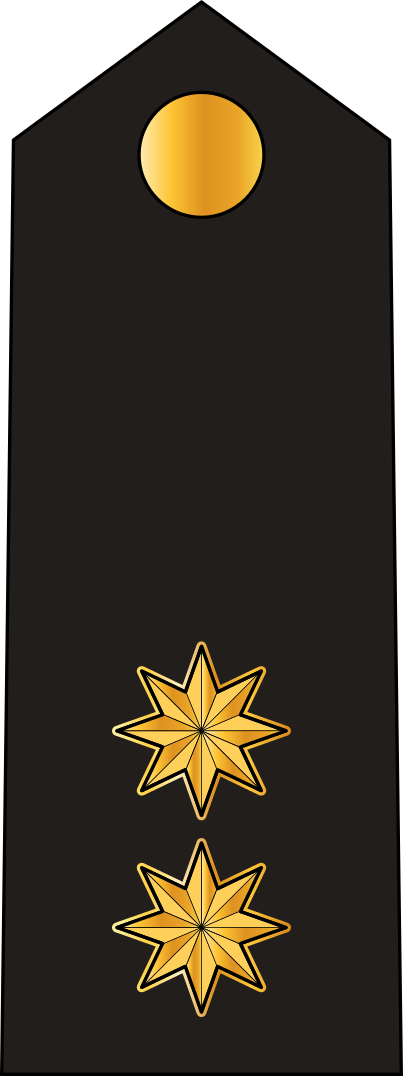
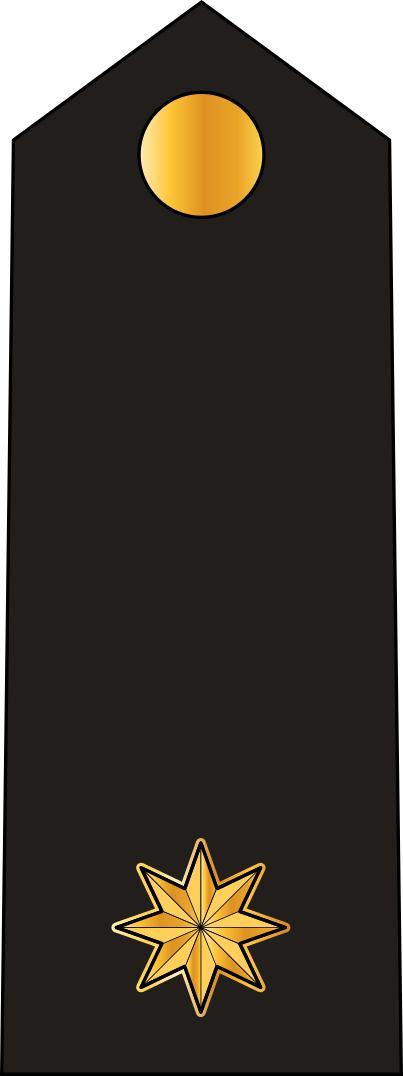
Rank group	General / flag officers				Senior officers			Junior officers
Azerbaijani Land Forces
Azerbaijani Land Forces	Ordu generalı	General-polkovnik	General-leytenant	General-mayor	Polkovnik	Polkovnik-leytenant	Mayor	Kapitan	Baş leytenant	Leytenant	Kiçik leytenant
Azerbaijani Navy
Azerbaijani Navy		Admiral	Vitse-admiral	Kontr-admiral	Birinci dərəcəli kapitan	Ikinci dərəcəli kapitan	Üçüncü dərəcəli kapitan	Kapitan-leytenant	Baş leytenant	Leytenant	Kiçik leytenant
Azerbaijani Air Force
Azerbaijani Air Force		General-polkovnik	General-leytenant	General-mayor	Polkovnik	Polkovnik-leytenant	Mayor	Kapitan	Baş leytenant	Leytenant	Kiçik leytenant
Rank group	General / flag officers				Senior officers			Junior officers

=== Student officer ranks ===
Rank group	V kurs	IV kurs	III kurs	II kurs	I kurs
Azerbaijani Land Forces
Azerbaijani Navy
Azerbaijani Air Force

== Other ranks ==
The rank insignia of non-commissioned officers and enlisted personnel.

Rank group	Senior NCOs						Junior NCOs	Enlisted
Azerbaijani Land Forces								No insignia
Azerbaijani Land Forces	Baş gizir	Gizir	Kiçik gizir	Baş çavuş	Çavuş	Kiçik çavuş	Baş əsgər	Əsgər
Azerbaijani Navy								No insigna
Azerbaijani Navy	Baş miçman	Miçman	Kiçik miçman	Baş çavuş	Çavuş	Kiçik çavuş	Baş matros	Matros
Azerbaijani Air Force								No insignia
Azerbaijani Air Force	Baş gizir	Gizir	Kiçik gizir	Baş çavuş	Çavuş	Kiçik çavuş	Baş əsgər	Əsgər
Rank group	Senior NCOs						Junior NCOs	Enlisted

== Officers (1992-2001) ==
The rank insignia for officers from 1992 to 2001.

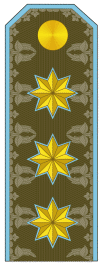
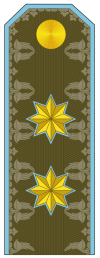
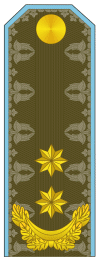
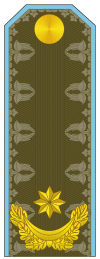
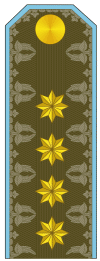
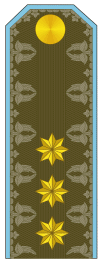
Rank group	General / flag officers					Senior officers			Junior officers
Azerbaijani Land Forces
Azerbaijani Land Forces	General-polkovnik	General-leytenant	General-mayor	Polkovnik	Polkovnik-leytenant	Mayor	Kapitan	Baş leytenant	Leytenant	Kiçik leytenant
Azerbaijani Navy
Azerbaijani Navy	Admiral	Vitse-admiral	Kontr-admiral	Birinci dərəcəli kapitan	Ikinci dərəcəli kapitan	Üçüncü dərəcəli kapitan	Kapitan-leytenant	Baş leytenant	Leytenant	Kiçik leytenant
Azerbaijani Air Force
Azerbaijani Air Force	General-polkovnik	General-leytenant	General-mayor	Polkovnik	Polkovnik-leytenant	Mayor	Kapitan	Baş leytenant	Leytenant	Kiçik leytenant
Rank group	General / flag officers					Senior officers			Junior officers

== Other ranks (1992-2001) ==
The rank insignia for NCOs and enlisted personnel from 1992 to 2001.

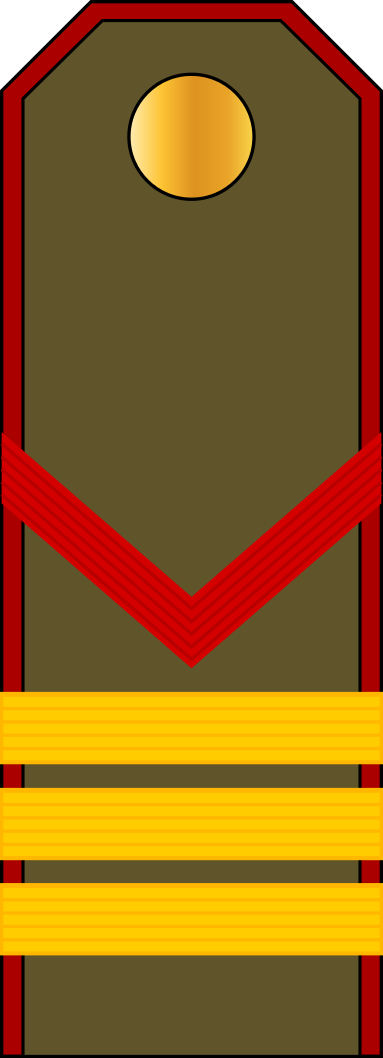
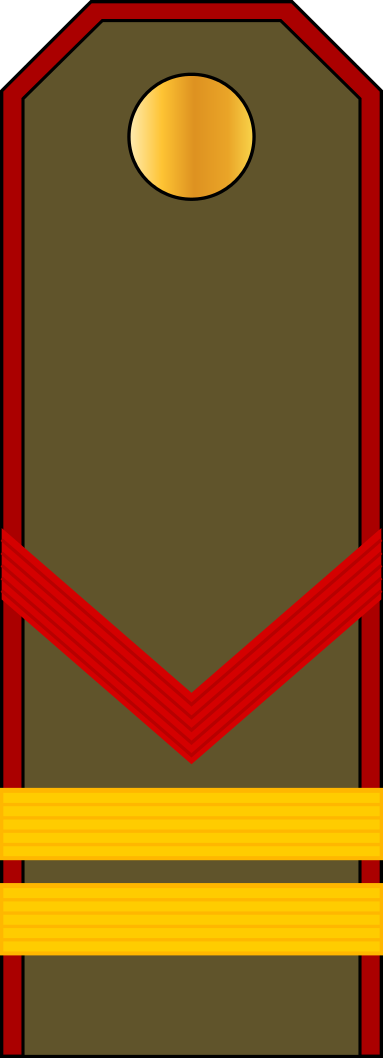
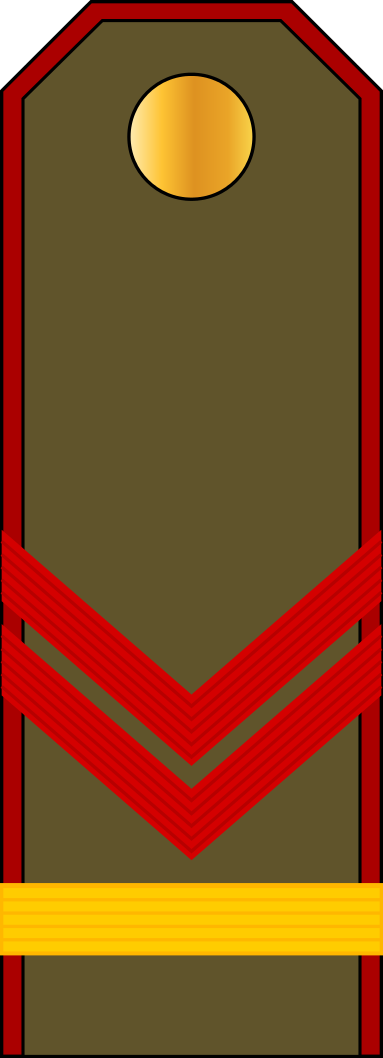
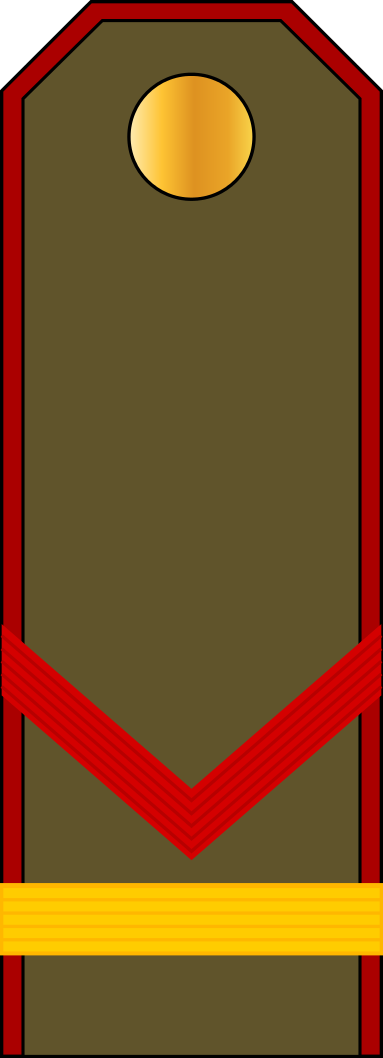
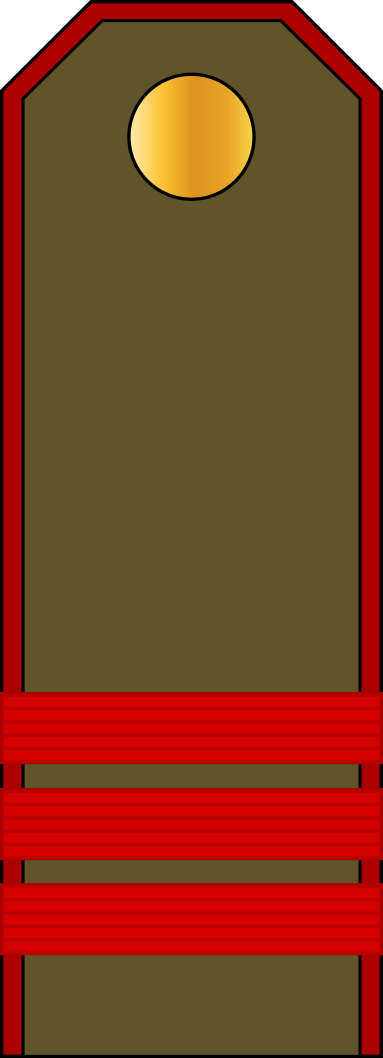
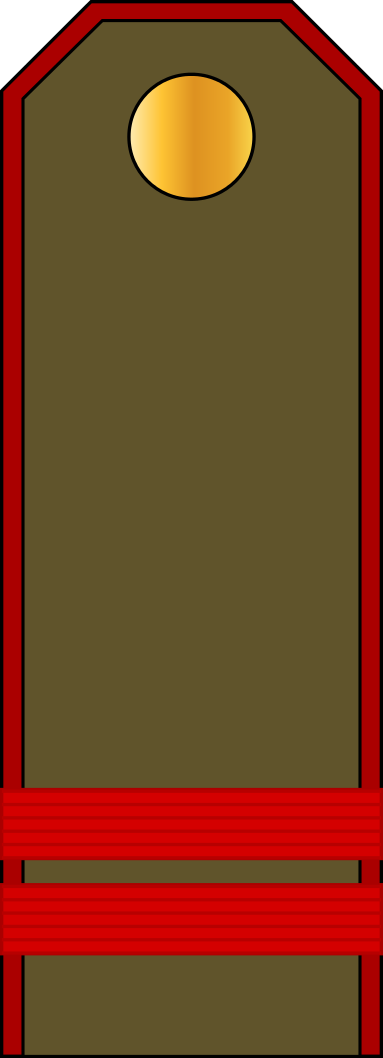
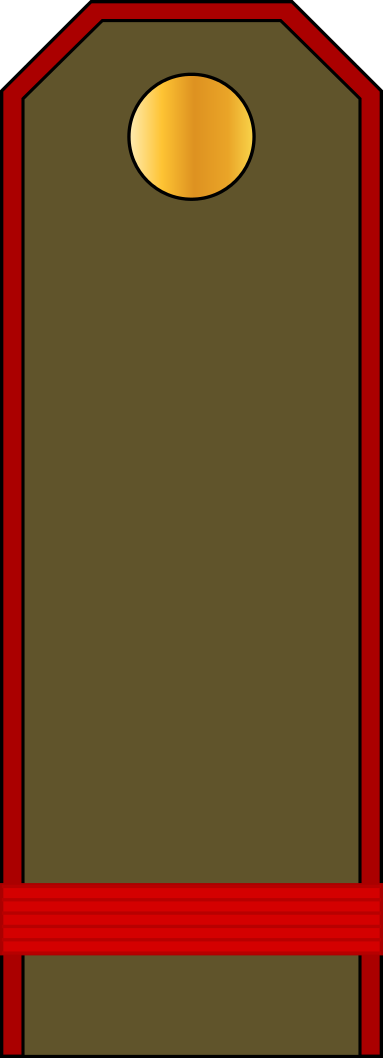
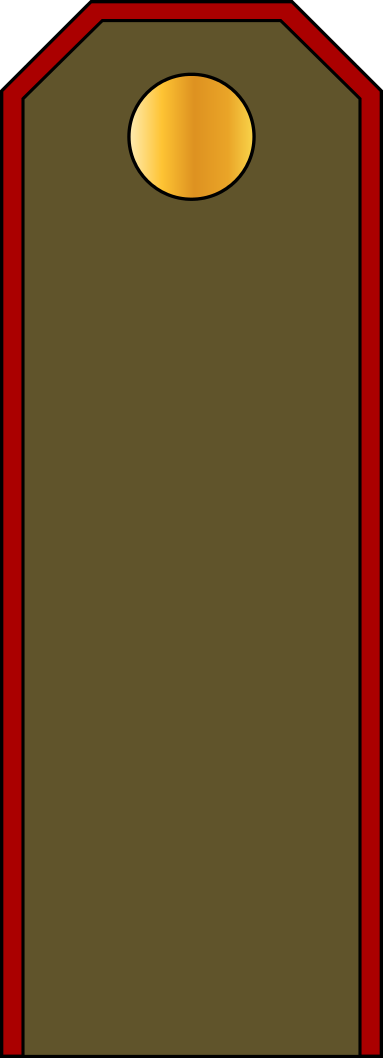
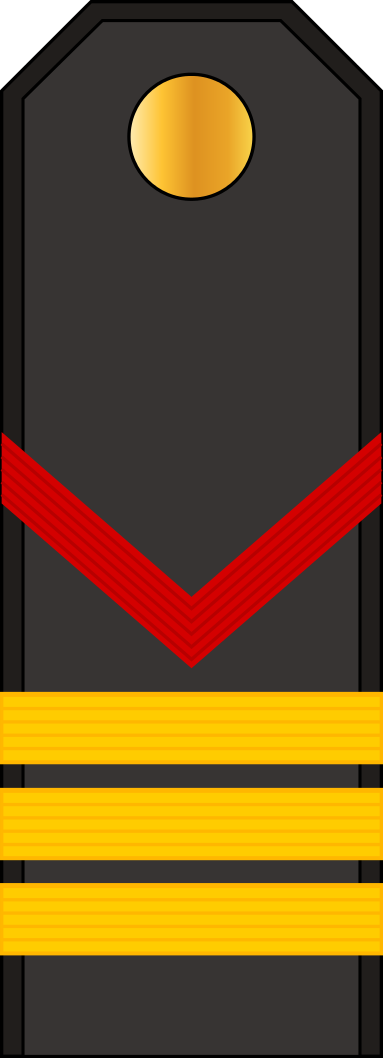
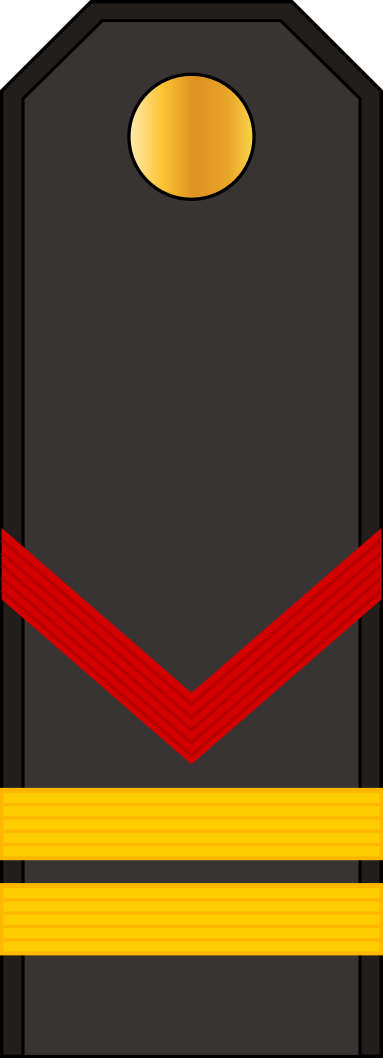
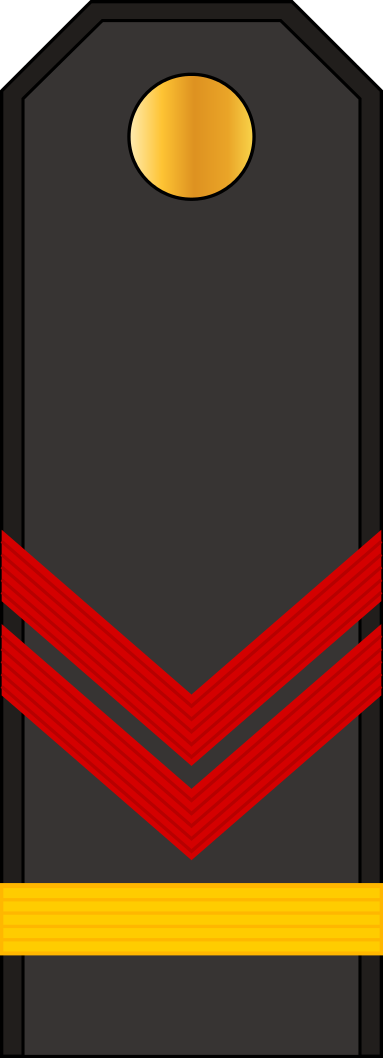
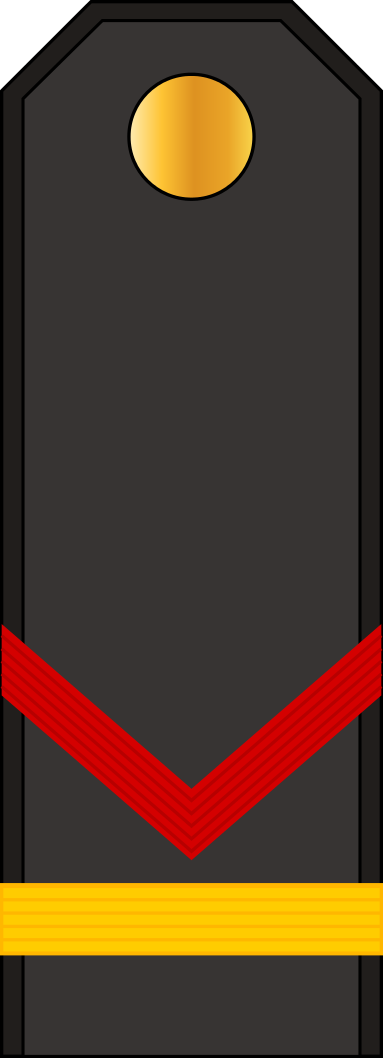
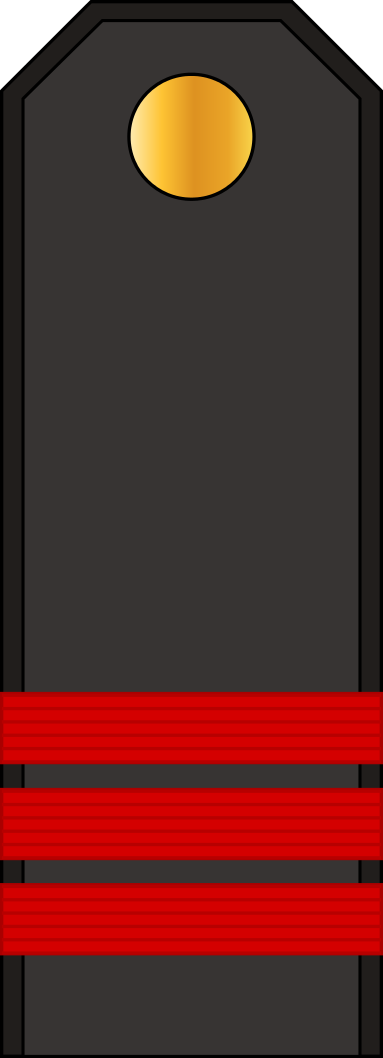
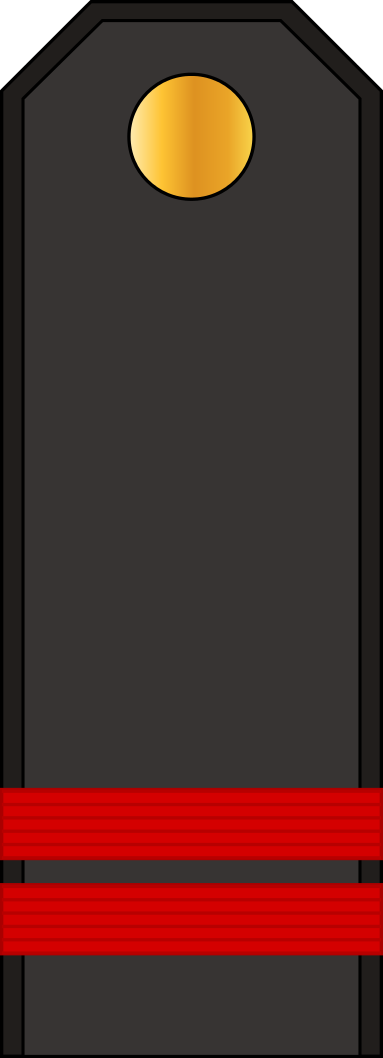
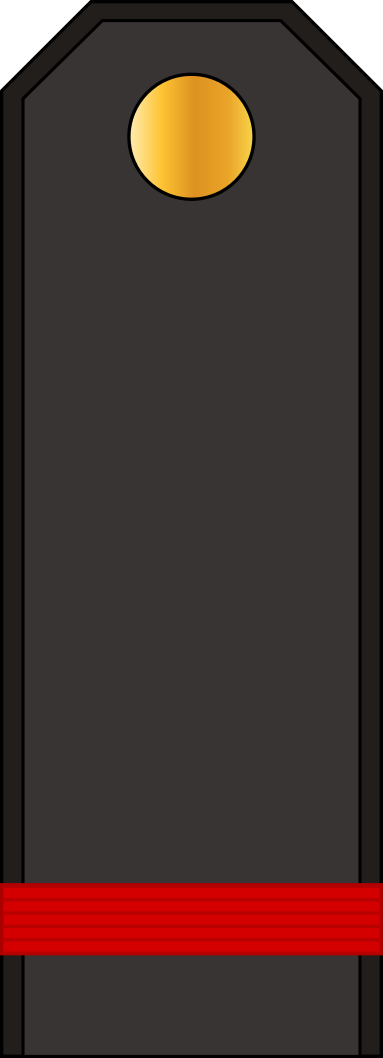
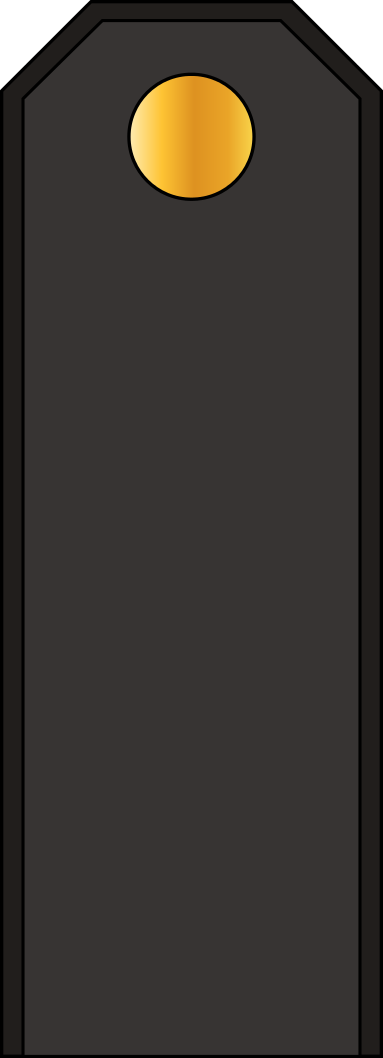
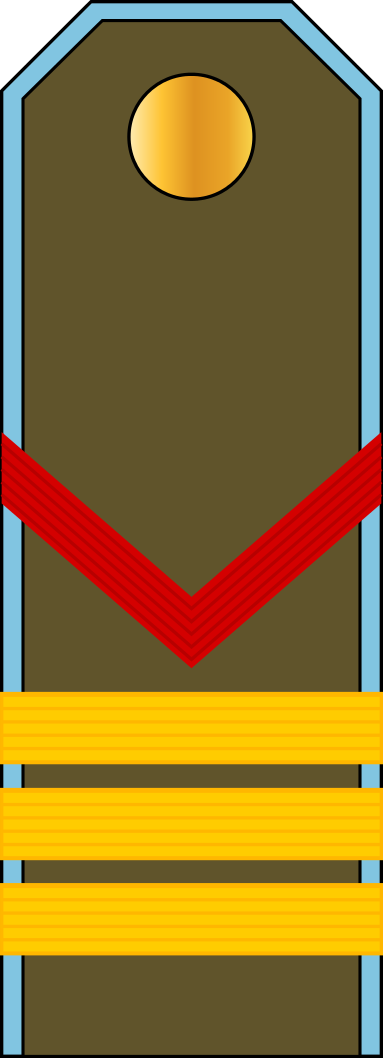
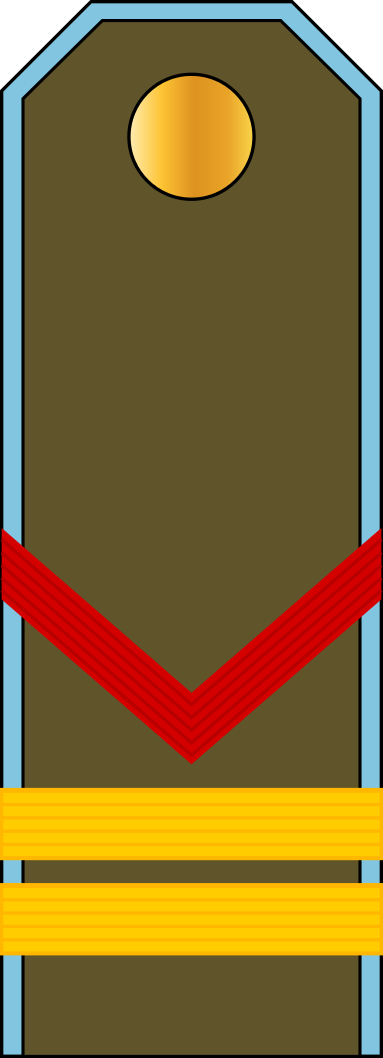
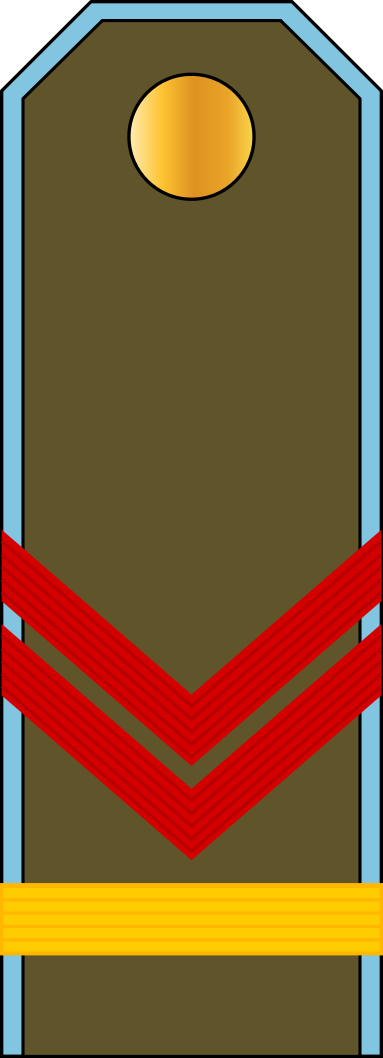
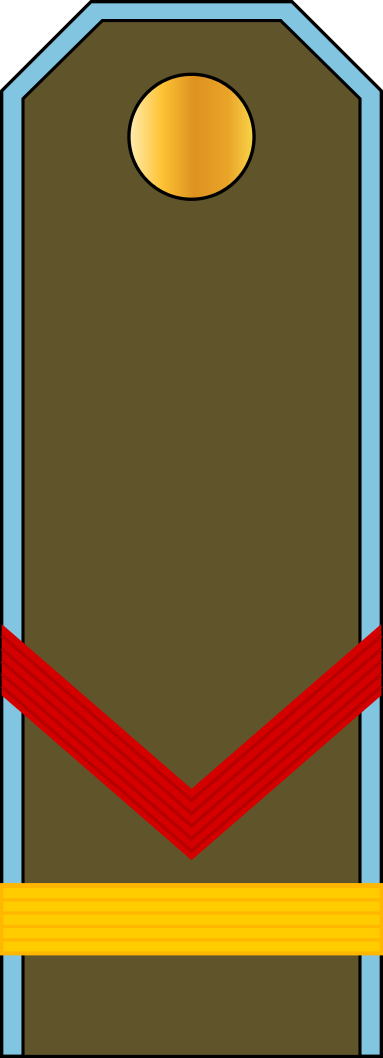
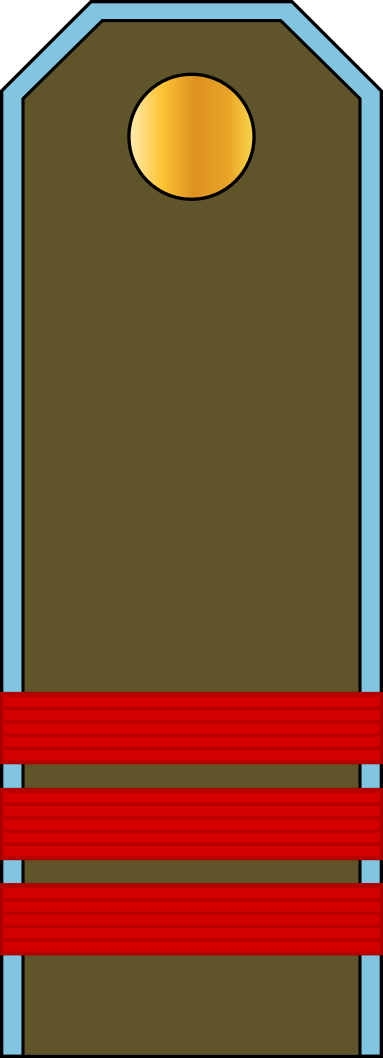
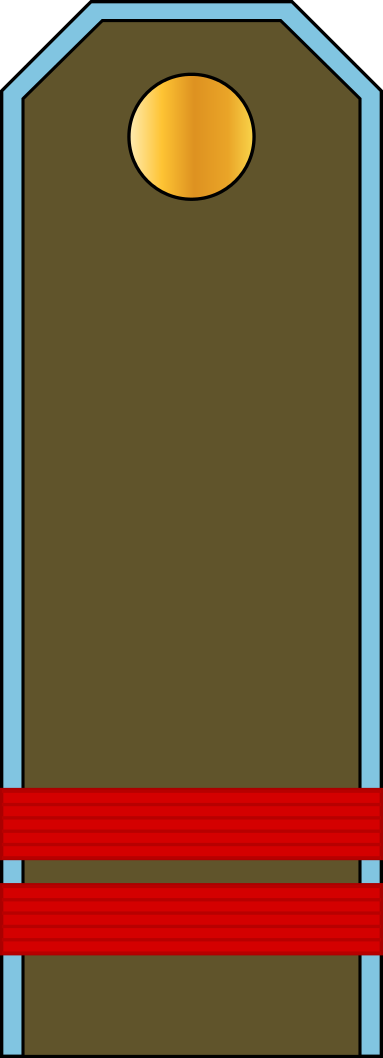
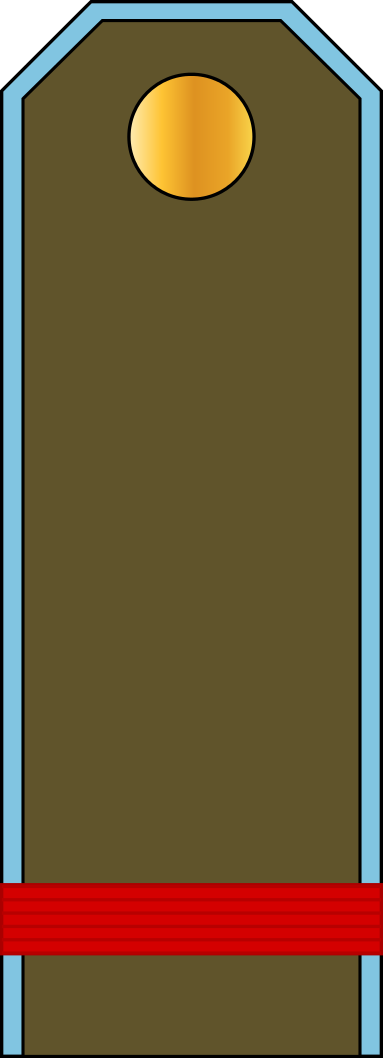
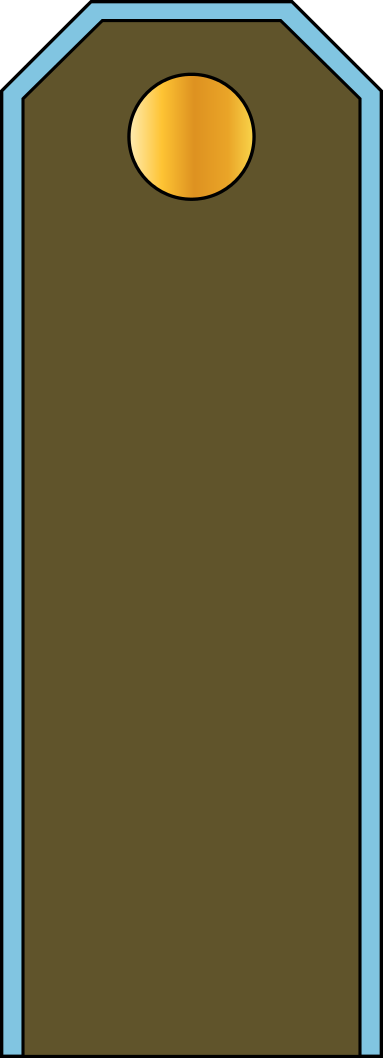
Rank group	Senior NCOs						Junior NCOs	Enlisted
Azerbaijani Land Forces (1990–2001)
Azerbaijani Land Forces (1990–2001)	Baş gizir	Gizir	Kiçik gizir	Baş çavuş	Çavuş	Kiçik çavuş	Baş əsgər	Əsgər
Azerbaijani Navy (1990–2001)
Azerbaijani Navy (1990–2001)	Baş miçman	Miçman	Kiçik miçman	Birinci starşina	Ikinci starşina	Üçüncü starşina	Baş dənizçi	Dənizçi
Azerbaijani Air Force (1990–2001)
Azerbaijani Air Force (1990–2001)	Baş gizir	Gizir	Kiçik gizir	Baş çavuş	Çavuş	Kiçik çavuş	Baş əsgər	Əsgər
Rank group	Senior NCOs						Junior NCOs	Enlisted
