= Fikrat Mammadov =

Azerbaijani lawyer

- Fikrət Məmmədov
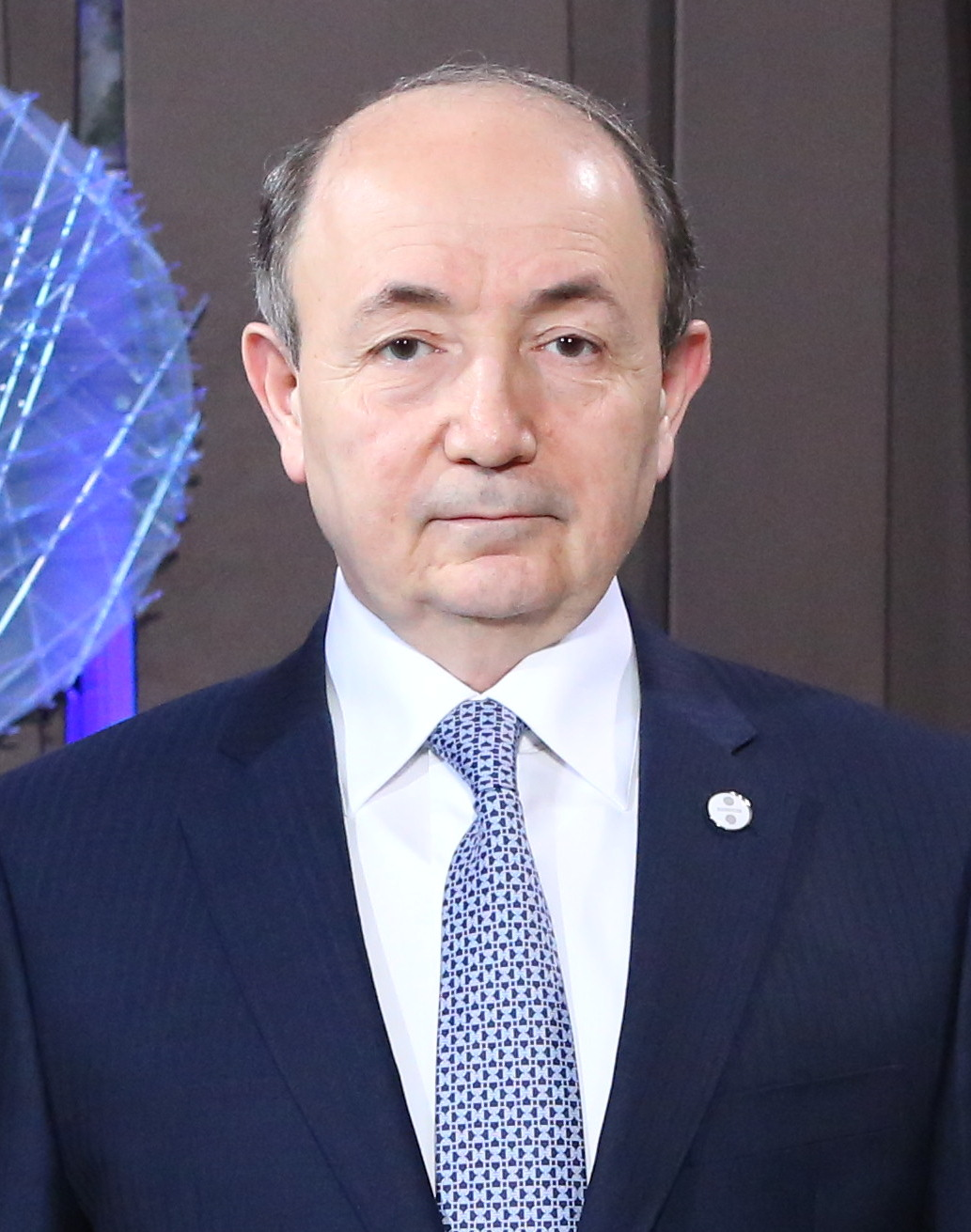
- Mammadov in 2017

Minister of Justice
- In office 18 April 2000 – 14 February 2024
- President: Heydar Aliyev; Ilham Aliyev
- Preceded by: Südaba Hasanova
- Succeeded by: Farid Ahmadov

Personal details
- Born: 1 July 1955 (age 71) Baku, Azerbaijan SSR, USSR
- Awards

Fikrat Farrukh oghlu Mammadov (Azerbaijani: Fikrət Fərrux oğlu Məmmədov; born 1 July 1955) is an Azerbaijani lawyer serving as the Minister of Justice of the Azerbaijan Republic since 2000.

== Early life and legal career ==
In 1977, he graduated from the Law faculty of Moscow State University, named after M.V.Lomonosov, and in 1988, from the Baku Social Management and Political Science Institute. He started his career in 1977 as Assistant District Prosecutor, then served as Department Prosecutor of the Baku City Prosecutor’s Office, as Senior Prosecutor of the General Prosecutor’s Office, and as Director of the Organization and Supervision Department.

Later, he served as Director of the Legal Department of the General Prosecutor’s Office, as Prosecutor of the Sumgayit City, and in 1994-2000 as Deputy Prosecutor General; in April 2000, he was appointed Minister of Justice of the Republic of Azerbaijan. He then was 4 times re-appointed to this position at the newly formed Governments. From 2005 till 2023, he was the Chairman of the Judicial-Legal Council, having been re-elected for this post several times. He holds the higher special rank of 1st Grade State Councilor of Justice. He is believed to have improved the judicial system of the country by bringing it in line with international standards. He is a Senator and Honorary Member of the International Association of Prosecutors, the Vice-President of the International Association of Anti-Corruption Authorities and of the UN Congress on Crime Prevention and Criminal Justice.

== Awards and titles ==
For the services made to the development of justice organs of the Republic of Azerbaijan, he was awarded with the Shohrat Order, following the 30 June 2005 Order of the President of the Republic of Azerbaijan; with the Honorary Diploma of the President of the Republic of Azerbaijan, following the 30 June 2015 Presidential Order; and with the 1st degree of the For Service to the Fatherland Order, following the 20 November 2018 Presidential Order.

For his efficient work in implementation of judicial and legal reforms and for significant contribution to the work of the Judicial-Legal Council, he received the Honorary Title of “Honored Lawyer of the Republic of Azerbaijan”, following the 21 November 2008 Presidential Order; he is also the Honorary Prosecutor.

He also has been awarded with various domestic medals, received medals and other awards from international organizations and foreign states.

== Personal life ==
Fikrat Mammadov is married with 4 children.
