= Ilyas Afandiyev =

Ilyas Afandiyev İlyas Əfəndiyev
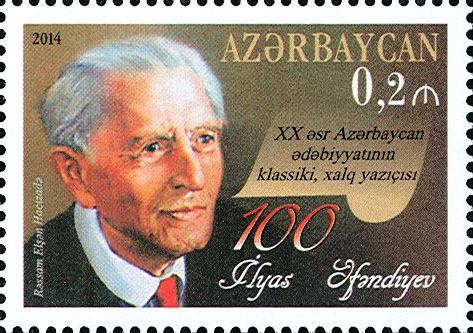
- Born: 26 May 1914; Fuzuli District, Elizavetpol Governorate, Russian Empire
- Died: 3 October 1996 (aged 82); Baku, Azerbaijan
- Occupation: Writer
- Children: Elchin Afandiyev and Timuchin Afandiyev

Ilyas Muhammad oglu Afandiyev (Azerbaijani: Əfəndiyev İlyas Məhəmməd oğlu; 26 May 1914 – 3 October 1996) was an Azerbaijani and Soviet writer, member of Azerbaijan Union of Writers (1940), Honored Art Worker of Azerbaijan (1960), laureate of the State Prize of Azerbaijan (1972) and People's Writer of Azerbaijan (1979).

== Biography ==
Ilyas Afandiyev was born on 26 May 1914 in Karyagino, Elizavetpol Governorate, Russian Empire (now Fuzuli District, Azerbaijan). In 1938, he graduated from the Lenin Azerbaijan State Pedagogical Institute in Baku. In 1939, his “Letters from the village” collection was published. In 1945, his “Serene nights” collection of stories was published. The collections are dedicated to the Soviet intelligentsia. Afandiyev was also noted as a playwright covering psychological themes which are still performed. He was the author of novels, sketches and literary-critical articles.

Afandiyev died on 3 October 1996 in Baku and was buried in the city's Alley of Honor.

== Works ==
=== Plays ===
- Expectation (1940)
- Bright ways (1947)
- Spring floods (1948)
- The Atayevs’ family (1954)
- You are always with me (1965)
- My guilt (1969)
- A devil came from a fiery desert
- A chandelier for ten mantas
- Believe in us
- I can't forget (1968)
- Erased diaries (1970)
- The song stayed in the mountains (1971)
- Weird boy (1973)
- Voice coming from the gardens (1976)
- Khurshidbanu Natavan (1980)
- In the crystal palace
- Shaikh Khiyabani (1986)
- Our strange destiny (1988)
- Sweethearts coupling in the hell (1989)
- A single oleaster tree (1991)
- Sensible and mad men (1992)
- The ruler and a girl (1994)

=== Novels ===
- Willow channel (1958)
- Cornel bridge (1960)
- Three friends beyond mountains (1964)
- Plane tree of khan
- Fairy tale of bulbul and Valeh (1976–1978)
- Old man, don't look back (1980)
