= Elchin Afandiyev =

Azerbaijani writer and politician (1943–2025)

- Elçin Əfəndiyev
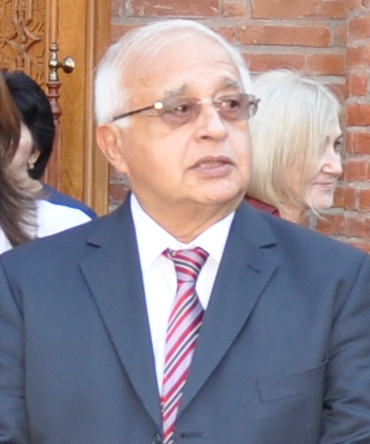
- Afandiyev in 2012

Deputy Prime Minister of Azerbaijan
- In office 1993–2018
- President: Heydar Aliyev (1993–2003); Ilham Aliyev (2003–2018)
- Minister: Surat Huseynov (1993-1994); Fuad Guliyev (1995–1996); Artur Rasizade; Ilham Aliyev (2003); Artur Rasizade (2003–2018)

Personal details
- Born: 13 May 1943 Baku, Azerbaijani SSR, USSR
- Died: 3 August 2025 (aged 82)
- Children: Humay Afandiyeva

Elchin Ilyas oglu Afandiyev, also known mononymously as Elçin (Azerbaijani: Elçin İlyas oğlu Əfəndiyev; 13 May 1943 – 3 August 2025) was an Azerbaijani writer, academic and politician who served as Deputy Prime Minister of Azerbaijan from 1993 to 2018.

== Early years ==
Afandiyev was born to the family of the Azerbaijani writer Ilyas Afandiyev on 13 May 1943 in Baku. Since his early childhood, Elchin Afandiyev was surrounded by literature and an academic environment. Azerbaijani folklore and world literature played a significant role in Afandiyev's future career. He wrote his first novel when he was 16 years old, which was published in Azərbaycan gəncləri (Azerbaijani Youth) magazine in 1959. He completed his secondary education in 1960 and studied at Baku State University, graduating in 1965 with a degree in philology. In 1968, he completed his post-graduate studies at the Nizami Institute of the Azerbaijan National Academy of Sciences, writing a 500-page dissertation.

In 1965, he published a collection of novels called Min gecədən biri (One of thousand nights). In the following years, nearly 100 books of Afandiyev were translated and published in English, French, German, Spanish, Turkish, Hungarian, Bulgarian, Arabic, Persian, Mandarin, Czech, Slovak, Polish, Croatian, Georgian, Lithuanian, Moldovan, Turkmen, Uzbek, Kazakh, Tajik, Serbian and other languages. There have been about five million copies sold worldwide.

Afandiyev’s play, Citizens of Hell, premiered in London in 2013.

== Political career ==
During Soviet rule, Afandiyev was a deputy in the Supreme Soviet of the Azerbaijan SSR. From 1993 to 2018, he served as Deputy Prime Minister of Azerbaijan. As a Deputy Prime Minister, he supervised various sectors of government activity such as sports and cultural relations. He also chaired the Vətən cultural organization, which focuses on cultural ties with other countries. He was also a member of several government committees and was a member of the Education Committee under the President of Azerbaijan.

== Death ==
Afandiyev died on 3 August 2025, at the age of 82. He was buried in the First Alley of Honor.

== Awards ==
Efendiyev was awarded the Istiglal Order for his contributions to the development of Azerbaijani literature by Heydar Aliyev, then-President of Azerbaijan on 29 May 2003.

== See also ==
- Cabinet of Azerbaijan
- Politics of Azerbaijan
- Literature of Azerbaijan
