= Judiciary of Azerbaijan =

National court system

The Judiciary of Azerbaijan exercises judicial power in Azerbaijan. Although the Azerbaijan constitution nominally guarantees judicial independence, the executive firmly controls prosecutors and judges. Judges and prosecutors collaborate in Azerbaijan to repress political opponents.

== Source of the judicial power in Azerbaijan ==
The Azerbaijan constitution holds that state power in the Republic of Azerbaijan is formed on the principle of separation of powers whereby legislative power is implemented by the Parliament, executive power is vested in a President of Azerbaijan, and judicial power is administered by courts.

== The Constitutional Court ==
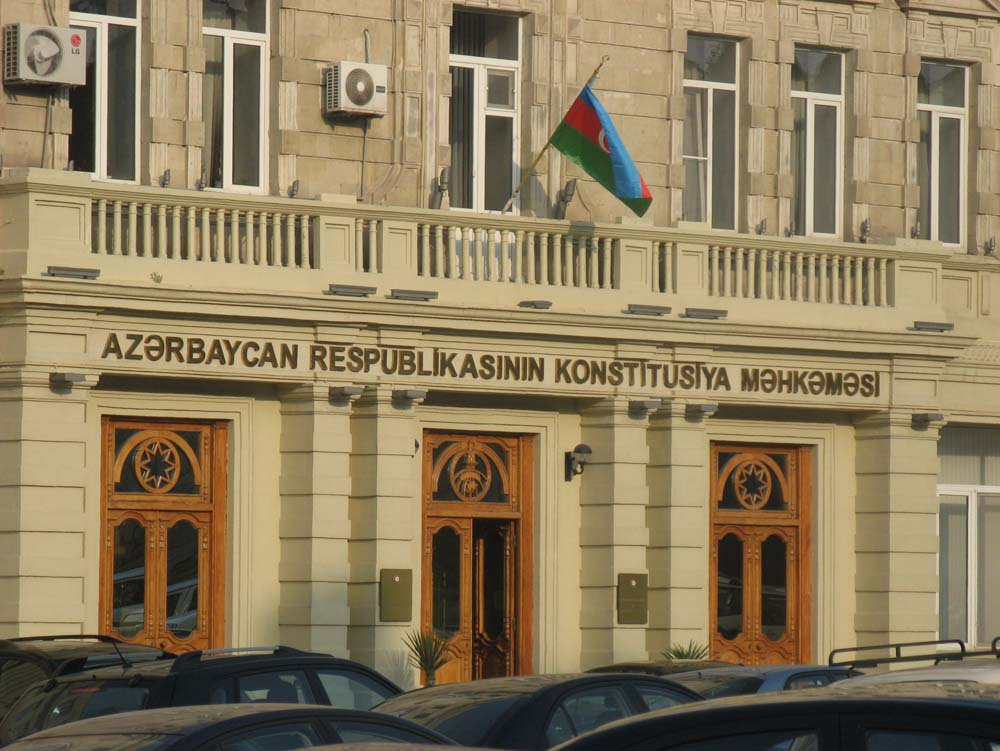
Constitutional Court of the Republic of Azerbaijan

The Constitutional Court is composed of 9 judges appointed by Parliament of the Azerbaijan Republic upon the recommendation of the President of Azerbaijan. Generally, a citizen of Azerbaijan having voting right, higher juridical education and at least 5-year working experience in the sphere of law can be a judge of all courts including the Constitutional Court. The judges is elected for a period of fifteen years. They cannot be elected again. The terms of office of judges expire when they reach the age of 70. However, a judge reached the age of 70 continue to hold office until replaced. The judges of Constitutional Court are independent and only act in accordance with the Constitution and laws of the Republic of Azerbaijan. Additionally, the judges of Constitutional Court enjoy immunity.

The primary purposes of the Constitutional Court are to realize the supremacy of the Constitution and protect the human rights of all persons. Everyone who claims to be the victim of a violation of his (her) rights or liberties by a decision of the legislative, executive and judiciary or by one of the municipal acts may appeal to the Constitutional Court of the Republic of Azerbaijan with the view of the restoration of his (her) breached human rights and liberties. Judgments of the Constitutional Court are compulsory within the territory of Azerbaijan.

== The Supreme Court (Court of third instance or Court of Cassation) ==
The Supreme Court is the highest instance (ultimate appeal) court on civil (including administrative and economic disputes), criminal, administrative offences cases and other cases previously tried by the general and specialized courts. The Supreme Court is located in Baku and its jurisdiction applies to the whole territory of the country. Following the issuance, all judgments of the Court are disseminated electronically within one month.

Number of judges of the Supreme Court is determined by the Judicial Legal Council. The parliament elects the judges upon the recommendation of the President. The judges of all courts including the Supreme Court are independent and only act at the Constitution and laws of the Azerbaijan Republic. Besides, the judges of Supreme Court have the right of immunity.

The Supreme Court comprises the Plenary Body and Cassation Chamber. The Court is composed of the President of the Supreme Court, vice-president, Presidents of the Boards and judges. The Court creates civil, administrative-economic, criminal and military sections. Consultative Research Council with the Court functions with the purpose of proper application of legislation, improvement of legislation and preparation of the scientific proposals. The Court has right to submit drafts of laws or resolutions submitted for consideration by Parliament.

== Appellate Courts (Courts of second instance) ==
Appeal court is a higher instance court on civil, administrative and economic disputes, criminal cases and administrative violations. Court of Appeal consists of the Plenary Board, civil panel, administrative-economic panel, criminal panel and military panel. Panels of judges are created at the Boards of the Court of Appeal to deal with the cases. Court of Appeal consists of the President of the court, vice-president, Presidents of the Boards and judges of the chambers. Number of judges of the Court of Appeal is determined by the Judicial-Legal Council. Plenary Board of the Court of Appeal consists of the President of the Court, vice-president and Presidents of the chambers. Members of the Plenary Board of the Court have equal rights within their competence. There are six Courts of Appeal in Azerbaijan:

- Supreme Court of the Nakhchivan Autonomous Republic
- Baku Appeal Court
- Ganja Appeal Court
- Sumgait Appeal Court
- Shirvan Appeal Court
- Sheki Appeal Court

== Courts of first instance ==
=== District Courts ===
District (city) court is established in districts, towns (except the towns of district subordination) and city districts of Azerbaijan. As a court of first instance, district (city) courts deal with civil, criminal, administrative and other disputes within their jurisdiction determined by law. The courts are composed of the President of the Court and judges. The vice-president is appointed if number of judges exceed 11. The judge of the Court is ex-officio considered as the President of Court if the court has only one judge. Number of judges is defined by Judicial Legal Council.

=== Specialized courts ===
==== Grave Crime Courts ====
Grave Crime Courts as a court of first instance deal with serious and especially serious crimes defined in Criminal Code of the Republic of Azerbaijan. The Court on Grave Crimes is composed of the President and judges. The deputy of the President of the Court is appointed if number of judges exceeds 11. Number of judges and other organizational matters are defined by Judicial Legal Council in accordance with the Constitution of Azerbaijan Republic. There are five Courts of Grave Crimes in Azerbaijan:

- Grave Crimes Court of Nakhchivan Autonomous Republic
- Baku Grave Crimes Court
- Ganja Grave Crimes Court
- Sheki Grave Crimes Court
- Lenkoran Grave Crimes Court

==== Military Courts ====
The Military Court as a court of first instance deals with the crimes against military service and crimes committed by military persons. The Military Court is composed of the President and judges. The vice-president of the Court is appointed if number of judges is 12 or more. Generally, number of judges and jurisdiction are defined by Judicial Legal Council. The following military courts exist in Azerbaijan:

- Military Court of Nakhchivan Autonomous Republic
- Baku Military Court
- Ganja Military Court
- Lankaran Military Court
- Fuzuli-Gubadli Military Court
- Tartar Military Court
- Agdam Military Court
- Gazakh Military Court
- Sumgait Military Court

==== Administrative-economic courts ====
Administrative-economic court is established in administratively divided territorial areas or in free trade zones of Azerbaijan. Administrative-economic courts as a first instance court render a judgement related to administrative and economic disputes in compliance with their jurisdiction determined by legislation. The President and judges form the Court. When 12 or more judges holds their offices in the Court the vice-president is appointed. Judicial Legal Council defines the number of judges and territorial jurisdiction of the Court. There are 7 administrative-economic courts in Azerbaijan:

- Administrative-Economic Court of the Nakhchivan Autonomous Republic
- Baku Administrative-Economic Court No1
- Baku Administrative-Economic Court No2
- Ganja Administrative-Economic Court
- Sheki Administrative-Economic Court
- Shirvan Administrative-Economic Court
- Sumgayit Administrative-Economic Court

== Access to the European Court of Human Rights ==
The Republic of Azerbaijan was admitted to the full membership of the Council of Europe on 25 January 2001. Since 15 April 2002 Azerbaijan is a party of the Convention for the Protection of Human Rights and Fundamental Freedoms. Since the ratification of the convention, the jurisdiction of the Court also includes Azerbaijan. Individuals under the jurisdiction of Azerbaijan can apply to the European Court of Human Rights if he (she) considers that his (her) human right embodied in the European Convention on Human Rights and Additional Protocols has been violated. Like all member states of the Council of Europe, a judge from Azerbaijan is presented in the European Court of Human Rights.

== Judicial-Legal Council ==
Judicial Legal Council has been created to implement the self-regulating functions of the judiciary. The Council consists of fifteen members 9 of which are judges, at the same time, representatives of advocacy and public prosecution member of the council. The Minister of Justice of Azerbaijan is considered ex-officio to be a President of the council. The council is independent and only act in accordance with the Constitution and laws of Azerbaijan Republic. The Council cooperates with the legislative, executive and judicial authorities, Bar Association of Azerbaijan Republic and scientific institutions.

The Council organizes the procedure of selection of new judges, detects the functioning of judges, arranges their transferring and promotion, takes a matter of disciplinary liability of them in hand, and deals with other matters regarding the courts and judges in accordance with their competence.

== Awards ==
Azerbaijan's newly established e-court system (namely the project – Court Pulse – The Management Revolution) was selected from 37 applications of 18 countries and awarded with the "special mention" by Council of Europe within the European "Crystal Scales of Justice Prize".

== See also ==
- Constitution of Azerbaijan
- Constitutional Court of Azerbaijan
- Law of Azerbaijan
- European Court of Human Rights
