= Supreme Court of Azerbaijan =

Highest court and final court of appeal

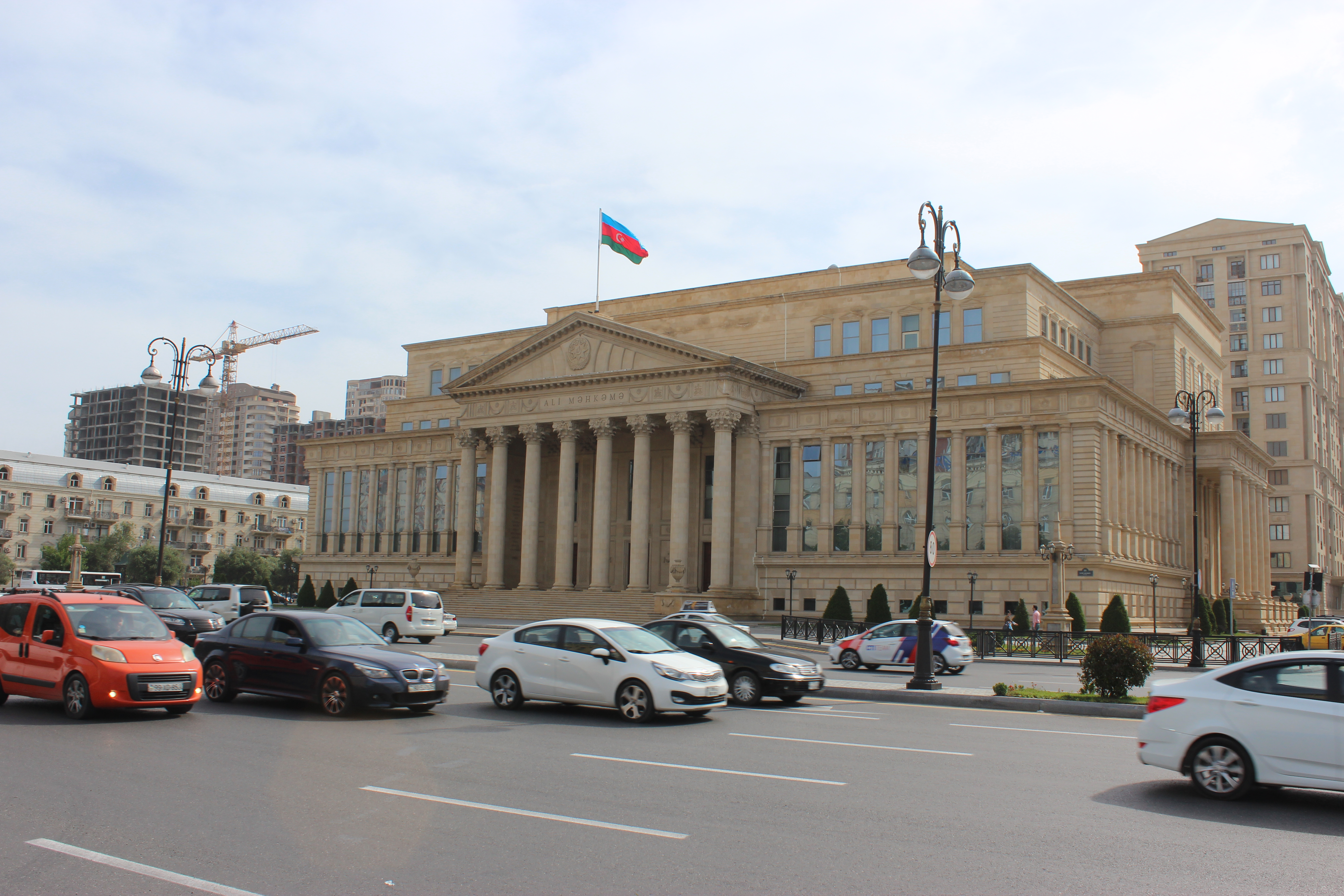
Supreme Court of Azerbaijan in Baku

The Supreme Court of Azerbaijan (Azerbaijani: Azərbaycan Ali Məhkəməsi) is the court of highest instance and final court of appeal of the three-staged judicial system in Azerbaijan. It was established pursuant to Article 131 of the Constitution of the Republic of Azerbaijan and Article 77 of the Law "on Courts and Judges". The Supreme Court has competence to carry out justice on civil (including administrative and economic disputes), criminal disputes and other cases related to the execution of general or specialized courts. Despite being established in Baku, its jurisdiction applies to the entire territory of the Republic of Azerbaijan.

== History ==
History of the modern judicial system in Azerbaijan started from the establishment of Azerbaijan Democratic Republic on 28 May 1918.

Starting from 1990s fundamental legal-judicial reforms have been carried out in Azerbaijan under the leadership of Heydar Aliyev, e.g. establishment of new three-stage judicial system, adopting several Codes (Land Code, Civil Code, Criminal Code, Code of Administrative Offence, Housing Code, etc). Judicial-Legal Council, contained of representatives of legislative, judicial and executive branches, was formed and actively took part in selection of the judges to the different instances including Supreme Court by testing or examination and interview.

== Structure ==
There are Plenum and Cassation chambers operating within the Supreme Court. The following chambers are established in the Supreme Court:

- Civil chamber
- Administrative Economic chamber
- Criminal chamber
- Military chamber

== Authorities of the Plenum ==
The Plenum of the Supreme Court is operating in the following structure the; Chairman of the Supreme Court, his deputy, chairpersons of board and judges. The members that included in the Plenum of the Supreme Court have equal rights within their authority. The Plenum of the Supreme Court hears the information of the chairmen of the courts on the issues related to on judicial practice of application of legislation in courts of the Republic of Azerbaijan and reports of Chairman of the Supreme Court, its chairperson and chairmen, chairmen of appellate courts, chairman of the Supreme Court of Nakhchivan Autonomous Republic and other general and specialized court chairmen about the status of the administration of justice issues, reviews materials about generalization of the practice of court and analysis of judicial statistics. Additionally, based on the proposal of the Chairman of the Supreme Court, it decides members of the Judicial Collegium. The Court approves the Statute and the Structure of the Scientific Advisory Board on the basis of recommendation of the Chairman of Supreme Court. It also has right to request Considers the request The Constitutional Court of Azerbaijan Republic in accordance with The Constitutional Court of Azerbaijan Republic. By taking into account the request of the President of the Republic of Azerbaijan on dismissal of the judges of the Republic of Azerbaijan in accordance with Article 128 of the Constitution of the Republic of Azerbaijan, the Court submits the relevant opinion to the President of the Republic of Azerbaijan within 30 days of the request; Clarify the courts on matters relating to court practice in accordance with Article 131 of the Constitution of the Republic of Azerbaijan; in cases and in accordance with the procedure prescribed by law, it deals with examine cases involving additional cassation or new cases of discrimination and violation of rights and freedoms the on the basis of the presentation of the Chairman of Supreme Court, the protest by the Prosecutor General of the Republic of Azerbaijan or the complaints of defending side. Moreover, in accordance with Article 96 of the Constitution of the Republic of Azerbaijan, reviews and make decisions on issues related to applying to the Milli Majlis of the Republic of Azerbaijan by legislative initiatives. The court is also have accountability to accept the oath of the judges of the Republic of Azerbaijan. In the cases that determined by the law, it considers complaints about the decisions of the Judicial-Legal Council.

== Working principles of the Plenum ==
The working principles of the Plenum have been defined according to the Article 80 of the Law of the Azerbaijan Republic (“On Courts and Judges”). The Supreme Court is convened approximately 4 times in a year under the leadership of the Chairman of the Supreme Court. The chairman of the Supreme Court of Nakhchivan Autonomous Republic, the chairmen of the courts of Appeal, the General Prosecutor of the Republic of Azerbaijan and other heads of the relative state bodies attend in the plenary sessions of the Supreme Court. During the sessions, the Court ensure the participation of the defense in the cases of new cases of violation of rights and freedoms and newly discovered cases. The members and also participants of the sessions Plenum are notified before the starting date of the meeting (not less than 10 days before). The participants are also provided with the topic of the discussion and relevant materials. In order to be effectual, not less than 2/3 of its members must participate in the sessions. The decisions are accepted due to voting results signed by the chairman of the meeting. The Office of the Supreme Court organizes Plenum meetings, and ensure implementation of the decisions of the Plenum.
