= Constitution of Azerbaijan =

Constitution adopted in 1995

The Constitution of the Republic of Azerbaijan (Azerbaijani: Azərbaycan Respublikasının Konstitusiyası) was adopted on 12 November 1995 by popular referendum. This was the first Constitution of independent Azerbaijan.

The first Constitution of independent Azerbaijan consists of 5 chapters, 12 sections, and 158 articles. It was amended on 24 August 2002 and again on 18 March 2009. It carries the "highest legal force" in Azerbaijan as per article 147. The most recent amendments to the Constitution were approved after the constitutional referendum held on 26 September 2016. In 2002, 31 amendments were made to 22 articles; in 2009, 41 amendments were made to 29 articles; and in 2016, 23 articles were amended and 6 new articles were added.

== History ==
The Azerbaijan Democratic Republic that was founded in 1918 and existed for 23 months until 1920, was unable to adopt its constitution. Therefore, the history of constitution building in Azerbaijan generally starts from the period of Azerbaijan being part of Soviet Union. The first Constitution of the Azerbaijan SSR was adopted in 1921 and was in accordance with the Constitution of USSR. The last Constitution of Azerbaijan SSR was adopted on 21 April 1978 and also was in line with the form of the USSR Constitution.

Azerbaijan declared its independence in 1991, and the preparation of a new constitution to replace the 1978 document began in 1992. The adoption of a new constitution was repeatedly delayed by civil and political turmoil. Pending the adoption of a new constitution, the fundamental document in the early 1990s was the October 18, 1991 Act of Independence, which government authorities described as the basis for a new constitution. During this interim period, the provisions of the 1978 constitution were valid if they did not violate or contradict the Act of Independence. The act declared that Azerbaijan is a secular, democratic, and unitary state, with equality of all citizens before the law. The freedoms enshrined in the Universal Declaration of Human Rights and other international human rights documents were to be upheld, and the right to form political parties was stipulated. The Act of Independence also proclaimed Azerbaijan's territorial integrity and its sovereignty over all its territory.

== Preamble ==
The Preamble to the Constitution specifies, in order to "provide prosperity and welfare of the whole society and each individual", that the following objectives be declared:

- protection of national sovereignty and territorial integrity
- a constitutional democracy
- establish a civil society
- a secular state based upon the rule of law
- a "worthy life level" for citizens and "just" economic and social order
- observance of "universal human values", peace and international cooperation

== Chapter 1, General Provisions ==
=== Section 1, People's Power ===
Section 1 establishes the source of state power being the Azerbaijani people and their unity, and states that most political issues are to be solved by referendum, defining as en exception taxation, state budget, amnesty and pardon. It defines that only authorized representatives elected by people have the right to represent the people, speak on behalf of people and to make statements on behalf of people. It also bans the usurpation of power.

=== Section 2, Fundamentals of the State ===
Section 2 establishes the basic principles, aims and role of the state of Azerbaijan, defines the head of a state and concepts in regard to military forces, property, natural resources, social, economic and development issues as well as state symbols, principles of foreign relations and the official language. It also establishes basis for religion and state, monetary unit, restrictions concerning state departments and capital.

== Chapter 2, Major Freedoms, Rights and Responsibilities ==
=== Section 3, Principal Human and Civil Rights and Freedoms ===
Generally, there are 48 Articles regarding principal human and Civil Rights and Freedoms in the Constitution of Azerbaijan. Section 3 establishes the major rights and freedoms of citizens of Azerbaijan, including human rights, property rights, equality rights and intellectual property rights, civil rights, the rights of the accused, the right to strike, social security, the right to vote and freedom of speech, conscience and thought.

=== Section 4, Principal Obligations of Citizens ===
Section 4 obliges citizens to obey laws, pay taxes, observe loyalty to and respect for the state of Azerbaijan and its symbols and states that it is the "duty of every Person" to participate in national defense, protection of national and historical monuments and protection of the environment. According to the Opinion of the Venice Commission, the latest modifications to the Constitution made in September 2016 Referendum are evaluated as positive steps in the direction of strengthening of constitutional protection of human rights. Introduction of the concept of “human dignity”, the right to “conscientious treatment excluding arbitrariness”, constitutionalisation of the principle of proportionality in human rights protection has been welcomed by the commission.

== Chapter 3, State Power ==
=== Section 5, Legislative Power ===
Section 5 establishes the National Assembly of Azerbaijan (Milli Majlis), its powers and its capacities. It defines number of deputies, Procedure of elections of deputies, Term of authority of a calling of Milli Majlis, Requirements to candidates to the posts of deputies, End of the term of authority of deputies, sessions of National Assembly, deprivation of deputies of their mandates and loss of powers by the deputy, Immunity of deputies, etc.

=== Section 6, Executive Power ===
Section 6 establishes the post of President of Azerbaijan and the President's requirements, duties, capacities and powers, as well as those of his Cabinet.

The 18 March 2009 amendment lifted the previous term limit of two five-year terms for the office of President, allowing President Ilham Aliyev to run for a third term after his second term ends in 2013.

=== Section 7, Judicial Power ===
Section 7 establishes the Azerbaijani judicial system and Constitutional and Supreme Courts.

=== Section 8, Nakhichivan Autonomous Republic ===
Section 8 establishes the autonomous government of the Nakhichivan region and its legislature (Ali Majlis).

== Chapter 4, Local Self-Government ==
=== Section 9, Municipalities ===
Section 9 establishes the basic structure of municipalities in Azerbaijan.

== Chapter 5, Justice and Law ==
=== Section 10, Legislative System ===
Section 10 upholds the Constitution as having the "highest legal force" and that no laws or decrees may contradict it; it also establishes the legislative system of the country, based upon the Constitution, referendums, laws, presidential decrees, resolutions of the Cabinet and Acts of executive bodies.

=== Section 11, Changes in the Constitution of the Republic of Azerbaijan ===
Section 11 establishes the process of amending the Constitution through referendum, and stipulates what sections of the Constitution cannot be cancelled.

=== Section 12, Additions to the Constitution of the Republic of Azerbaijan ===
Section 12 establishes the process of adding provisions to the Constitution through referendum.

== Transitional Clauses ==
Transitional clauses provide conditions for taking power of the Constitution and its application in regard to different branches of power defined by it.

== Holiday ==
Constitution Day is celebrated on 12 November as a national holiday.
