= Social security in Azerbaijan =

The social protection system in Azerbaijan consists of programs aimed at reducing the poverty and economic problems of the population through promoting effective labor markets as well as reducing the risks faced by citizens. Social insurance consists of pensions, unemployment benefit, health insurance, and other social benefits.

In the late 1990s and early 2000s, pensions and health care funding increased amid growing oil wealth in Azerbaijan. Since 2006, pensions have not kept pace with the increased cost of living.

The state social protection system in Azerbaijan consists of two main parts: 1) social insurance; and 2) social security.

The State Social Protection Fund implements social security programs, and the Ministry of Labour and Social Protection of the Population carries out social protection programs.

== Legal framework ==
The changes in the social protection system started with the realization of the "Concept of Pension Reform in the Republic of Azerbaijan" approved by the Decree of the President of the Republic of Azerbaijan dated July 17, 2001.

Law of Azerbaijan “On individual accounts in the system of the state social insurance” was approved by president on 27 November 2001. And this law gave authority to State Social Protection Fund for carrying out individual accounting in the state social insurance system.

== Social Security expenditures ==
In 2016, the expenditures of State Social Protection Fund amounted AZN 3 078.6 million, of which AZN 1,100 million was transferred from the state budget, and in 2014, these indicators were AZN 2 928.5 million and AZN 1,142 accordingly.

According to the 2017 budget draft, totally 2117.7 million manat was allocated to social security, targeted social assistance and social insurance.

Expenditures and revenues of the State Social Protection Fund under the Ministry of Labor and Social Protection of Population for 2017 were AZN 3,400,000, of which AZN1,270,000 or 37.4% was transformed from the state budget.

As well as, 597.9 million manat was allocated for social benefits, scholarships and other social payments by the Ministry of Labor and Social Protection of the Population and its relevant bodies, and 242.2 million manat was allocated to provide social protection of refugees and internally displaced persons by The State Committee for Refugees and IDPs.

== Social insurance ==
The following works have been carried out within the framework of “State Program on Development of Insurance and Pension System in the Republic of Azerbaijan” in order to improve the insurance-pension system in the country for 2009-2015:

- The State Social Protection Fund has started the appointment of age pension from an unified center in an automated manner since July 11, 2013.
- "Pension +" service has been put into operation since January 2014.
- The process of payment of pensions by plastic cards has been completed by the end of 2015. All pensioners, including pensioners living in rural areas, have been provided with plastic cards.

== Social Security ==
=== Targeted Social Assistance ===
The president of country signed a decree on the improvement targeted social assistance on February 25, 2015. Single Electronic Application and Nomination Sub-System (Vahid Elektron Müraciət və Təyinat Alt Sistemi - VEMTAS) on targeted state social assistance was created by Ministry of Labour and Social Protection of the Population.

The Cabinet of Ministers made a number of amendments to the " Rules for applying for targeted state social assistance, its appointment, issuance and refusal of issuance" with the decision of 11.02.2016.

=== Presidential scholarships ===
In 2016, the number of citizens granted by Presidential scholarships increased by 58.6%, and average monthly benefits for the families of the martyrs increased by 11.5%, for National Heroes by 67.7%, for war invalids by 66.4% compared to 2012.

Disabled person in the first degree have been provided with a monthly pension of 60 manat by the order of the President of Azerbaijan, since 2015.

=== Presidential scholarships ===
According to the official website of State Statistical Committee, unemployed persons was 5% in 2015. The number of people receiving unemployment benefits among unemployed persons has been around 0.5% in recent years.

=== Social benefits to disabled, elderly and internally displaced persons ===
On January 9, 2013, the President of Azerbaijan signed the Order " On additional measures to provide social services for children with disabilities and those in a dangerous social situation that have not reached adolescence". In 2013, the Ministry of Labor and Social Protection of Population approved 17 priority projects. During the implementation of the projects, in 2013, 800 children under 18, were provided socio-psychological, legal and reintegration services.

Regulations on the criteria for determination of disability and health condition was approved by the Decree of the Cabinet of Azerbaijan dated December 30, 2015.

Twinning project "Development of social services" organized by the Ministry of Labor and Social Protection of Population with the financial support of European Union was carried out during June 1, 2015 - May 31, 2017.

The "Action Plan for the Ministry of Labor and Social Protection of Population of the Republic of Azerbaijan for 2014" has been prepared and implemented in order to ensure the implementation of "State Program on Deinstitutionalization and Alternative Care in the Republic”.

The Medical Social Expertise and Rehabilitation Sub-System (TSERAS) was established in the centralized information system of the Ministry of Labour and Social Protection of the Population by the Decree of the President dated 14 September 2015 "On the improvement of assessment system of restriction of disability and health care opportunities ".

== See also ==
- Human Rights in Azerbaijan
- Children’s rights in Azerbaijan
