= Avaz Alakbarov =

Azerbaijani politician and scientist

Avaz Alakbarov Əvəz Ələkbərov
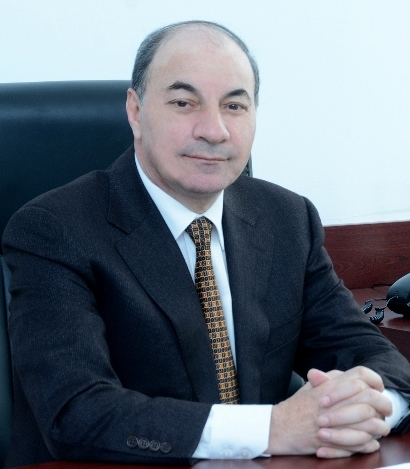

Minister of Finance of Azerbaijan
- In office July 11, 1999 – April 18, 2006
- President: Heydar Aliyev; Ilham Aliyev
- Preceded by: Fikrat Yusifov
- Succeeded by: Samir Sharifov

Personal details
- Born: July 23, 1952 (age 74) Jil, Chambarak, Armenian SSR, Soviet Union
- Party: New Azerbaijan Party
- Children: Elnur Alakbarov; Zaur Alakbarov
- Education: Azerbaijan State Economic University
- Occupation: Politician, Scientist
- Profession: Economist

Avaz Alakbarov Akbar oglu (Azerbaijani: Əvəz Ələkbərov Əkbər oğlu) (born July 23, 1952) is an Azerbaijani prominent economist, state, public political figure and doctor of economical science who served as Minister of Finance of Azerbaijan Republic from July 1999 to April 2006.

== Biography ==
Alakbarov was born in the village of Jil, Chambarak, Armenian SSR. He graduated with an Honorary Diploma in Economics from Azerbaijan State Institute of National Economy (now Azerbaijan State University of Economics) named after Dadash Bunyadzade in 1973. From 1973 to 1974, he served in the Soviet Armed Forces Units in Belarus. Alakbarov's career began as an accountant at Baku's construction company in 1973. From 1975 until 1981, Dr. Alakbarov worked in the position of Senior Economist with the Ministry of Agriculture of Azerbaijan SSR, "Azergurashdirmatikinti" Trust. He later held Head of the Planning Department and Deputy Chief of the Trust on Economic Issues.

From 1981 to 1984, Dr. Alakbarov held the Financial Planning Department's Senior Assessor and from 1984 to 1991 Deputy Head of the Economics Department in the Council of Ministers of Azerbaijan SSR. He became the Head of Azerbaijan branch of Pension Fund of USSR in 1991. He was appointed by Presidential decree as the Chairman of the Board of Azerbaijan Pension Fund in 1991. Then he spent 1992 through 1999 serving as Chairman of the State Social Protection Fund of the Azerbaijan Republic.

Alakbarov was appointed Finance Minister by President Heydar Aliyev on July 11, 1999, and served as minister until October 2003. On November 5, 2003, government reshuffle, President Ilham Aliyev confirmed Avaz Alakbarov as Finance Minister of Azerbaijan Republic and later on April 18, 2006 Ilham Aliyev dismissed him from his position replacing him with Samir Sharifov.

He participated as a speaker at international and bilateral interstate conferences in the United States, Great Britain, China, Turkey, Switzerland, Belgium, Norway, Russia, Saudi Arabia, Denmark, India, and various other countries.

He was a member of New Azerbaijan Party Political Board from May 2000 till June 2013.

In 2003 received an Academic degree as a Candidate in Economic Sciences. Dr. Alakbarov is a full member of the International Academy of Management since June 9, 2005. He wrote several books dealing with the Socio-economic development of Azerbaijan Republic to receive an Academic degree of Doctor of Economic Sciences.

== Academic career ==
Dr. Alakbarov defended his dissertation on economic sciences, established by the Supreme Attestation Commission under the President of the Republic of Azerbaijan on September 30, 2003, at the Institute of Economy of the National Academy of Sciences of Azerbaijan, in Baku, the topic of "Problems of Formation and Development of Social Insurance in Azerbaijan in Market Conditions" (Doctor of Economic Sciences, Professor, Honored Scientist Tofig Guliyev, doctor of economics, professor Kamil Shahbazov, candidate of economic sciences, associate professor Adile Gozelova, the leading organization of the Russian Academy of Labor and Social Affairs).

On January 15, 2008, he defended his doctoral dissertation on "Problems of financial and budgetary regulation of socio-economic development" at the dissertational Dissertation Council (official opponents were a correspondent member of ANAS Ali Nuriyev, Doctor of Economic Sciences, Professor Rafig Aliyev, Scientific Research Institute of Economic Reforms of the Ministry of Economic Development of the Republic of Azerbaijan), has been working as a doctor of economic sciences and has been engaged in scientific activity.

Dr. Alakbarov has up to 80 scientific publications, author of 5 monographs, 1 bibliographic book, and nine textbooks. The candidate's dissertation and the doctoral thesis were carried out at the Institute of Economic of ANAS. He has more than 500 articles on socio-political and economic issues globally and in the country's press. From February 2016, he is the Head of the Department of Finance and Financial Institutions of the Azerbaijan State Economic University and the Chairman of the Board of Directors of "Professors Club." By order of the Minister of Education of the Republic of Azerbaijan, he is a member of the dissertation council on the specialty "Finance," a member of the "Dissertation Council" on the Doctor of Sciences and philosophy on the order of the Supreme Attestation Commission under the President of the Republic of Azerbaijan.

On July 20, 2017, by the Decree of the President of the Republic of Azerbaijan, he was awarded the honorary title "Distinguished Teacher" for his sufficient work in the field of education in Azerbaijan.

On February 2, 2024, by the Decree No. 4289 of the President of the Republic of Azerbaijan, he was awarded "The jubilee medal 100 years of Heydar Aliyev (1923-2023)".

Dr. Alakbarov speaks fluent Azeri, Russian, and Turkish. Dr. Alakbarov has two children and grandchildren.

=== Honours and awards ===
- "The Global 500: Leaders for the New Century" by Barons Who's Who, 2001 in the USA.
- Active member of the International Academy of Management (2005)
- "100th Anniversary of Azerbaijani Trade Unions" Medal (2006)
- Badge for "Strengthening Customs Co-operation" (2006)
- By the decision of the European Press House, the "Best Patriotic Investigator Scientist" Gold Medal (2016)
- Active member of the European Academy of Natural Sciences (2016)
- “Honorary Ambassador of the Culture and Peace of Turkish World” (2017)
- European Service Order to his Science and Education Services by the UN Council for Public Awards (2017)
- Honorary Teacher of the Azerbaijan Republic (2017)
- International Academy of Sciences of the Turkish World, "Atatürk Prize" (2018)
- European Academy of Natural Sciences medal of Gottfried Wilhelm Leibniz (2018)
- Honorary scientist of Europe (2018)
- Ambassador of Peace honorary title for services in the world science and economical by the UN Council for Public Awards (2019)
- "Leonhard Euler medal" international award for his world science services by the UN Council for Public Awards (2019)
- The Scientist of the Year by the UN Council for Public Awards (2019)
- The Order of the European Leader Star by the UN Council for Public Awards (2020)
- "100th anniversary of Heydar Aliyev (1923–2023) jubilee medal" (2024)
