= Zaka Mirzayev =

Chairperson of the Board of the State Social Protection Fund under the Ministry of Labour and Social Protection of Population of the Republic of Azerbaijan
- Incumbent
- Assumed office 16 April 2025
- President: Ilham Aliyev
- Preceded by: Himalay Mamishov

Personal details
- Born: 1978 (age 47–48)
- Party: New Azerbaijan Party
- Education: Baku State University (1996-2000)
- Website: https://dsmf.gov.az/

Zaka Mirzayev (born 1978) is an Azerbaijani public official serving as the chairperson of the Board of the State Social Protection Fund under the Ministry of Labour and Social Protection of Population of the Republic of Azerbaijan. He also holds the position of the Chairperson of the I nternational Association of Pension and Social Funds and is a member of the Bureau of the International Social Security Association.

== Early life and education ==
Zaka Mirzayev was born in 1978. He graduated from Baku State University with a bachelor's degree in International Law and International Relations in 2000, a master's degree with honors in 2002, and completed his postgraduate studies in 2007. He is fluent in English and Russian.

He is a member of the New Azerbaijan Party.

== Career ==
Mirzayev began his professional career in 2000 as a legal advisor in the private sector. From 2003 to 2004, he fulfilled his compulsory military service in the Armed Forces of Azerbaijan.

In 2005, he entered public service at the Ministry of Finance of the Republic of Azerbaijan as a Chief Advisor. In 2009, he became Head of a Division of the Financial Services Policy Department, and in 2016, he was appointed Deputy Head of the same department.

During his tenure at the Ministry of Finance, alongside his responsibilities in legislative and policy matters, he represented Azerbaijan in several national and international working groups.

Mirzayev served as a member of the expert group for the Council of Europe's MONEYVAL Committee, participated in the working group for Azerbaijan's accession to the World Trade Organization, and was a member of the presidential working group established to create the Financial Market Supervisory Authority. Additionally, he represented Azerbaijan in financial matters at the Standing Committee for Economic and Commercial Cooperation (COMCEC) of the Organization of Islamic Cooperation (OIC).

In 2018, Mirzayev transitioned to the State Social Protection Fund (SSPF) under the Ministry of Labour and Social Protection of Population. In 2018, he was appointed Head of the Administration for Military and Special Rank Personnel Affairs of the SSPF. In 2019, he was appointed Head of the Administration for Assignment with Special Conditions of the SSPF. From 2020 until 16 April 2025, he served as the deputy chairperson of the Board of the State Social Protection Fund.

On 16 April 2025, he was appointed chairperson of the Board of the State Social Protection Fund under the Ministry of Labour and Social Protection of Population of the Republic of Azerbaijan.

Since 2025, he has held the position of Chairperson of the International Association of Pension and Social Funds and has served as a member of the Bureau of the International Social Security Association.

== Scientific Activity and Family ==
He is the author of more than 20 scientific articles and a co-author of four books, one of which is a textbook.

He is married and has four children.
