= Fikrat =

Fikrat is a given name. Notable people with the name include:

- Fikrat Goja (1935–2021), Azerbaijani poet
- Fikrat Mammadov (born 1955), Azerbaijani lawyer and Minister of Justice
- Fikrat Yusifov (born 1957), Azerbaijani economist and politician
