= Azerbaijan Handball Federation =

Governing body of handball in Azerbaijan

Azerbaijan Handball Federation Azerbaijani: Azərbaycan Həndbol Federasi̇yasi AHF
- IOC nation: Republic of Azerbaijan (AZE)
- Sport: Handball
- Other sports: Beach handball
- Official website: www.handball.az

HISTORY
- Year of formation: 1992; 34 years ago

AFFILIATIONS
- International federation: International Handball Federation (IHF)
- IHF member since: 1992
- Continental association: European Handball Federation
- National Olympic Committee: National Olympic Committee of the Azerbaijani Republic

GOVERNING BODY
- President: Saleh Mammadov

HEADQUARTERS
- Address: ABU Arena, K. Rahimov St. 15, 1072 Baku
- Country: Azerbaijan
- Secretary General: Yusif Atakishiyev

The Azerbaijan Handball Federation (AHF) (Azerbaijani: Azərbaycan Həndbol Federasi̇yasi) is the administrative and controlling body for handball and beach handball in the Republic of Azerbaijan. Founded in 1992, AHF is a member of European Handball Federation (EHF) and the International Handball Federation (IHF).

== Prehistory ==
In October 1958, Baku hosted the first international handball match between the national team of the capital and the team of Tbilisi, in which the team from Baku won. From 1956 to 1961, a number of handball matches were held in the Soviet Union, in which Baku teams took part. The Spartak women's team placed 5 times 1970–1974. Since 1991, the handball teams "Aipara", "Baku", "Haiita", "Abu" began to represent Azerbaijan at the international level.

== National teams ==
- Azerbaijan men's national handball team
- Azerbaijan women's national handball team
- Azerbaijan national beach handball team
- Azerbaijan women's national beach handball team

== Competitions ==
- Azerbaijan Premier Handball League
- Azerbaijan Women's Handball Championship
