= Ministry of Labour and Social Protection of the Population =

The Ministry of Labour and Social Protection of the Population might refer to:

- Ministry of Labour and Social Protection of the Population (Azerbaijan)
- Ministry of Labour and Social Protection of the Population (Kazakhstan)
