= Araz Valley Economic Zone =

- Location: Jabrayil District, Azerbaijan
- Opening date: 4 October 2021
- Manager: Economic Zones Development Agency
- Owner: Government of Azerbaijan
- Size: 200 ha (490 acres)

Araz Valley Economic Zone Industrial Park (Azerbaijani: “Araz Vadisi İqtisadi Zonası” Sənaye Parkı) is an industrial park located in the Jabrayil District of Azerbaijan.

== Development ==
The Araz Valley Economic Zone Industrial Park was established by a presidential decree dated 4 October 2021. The decree defined the park as a specially designated area with centralized infrastructure and management for industrial production, processing, and service activities. Management of the park was assigned to the Economic Zones Development Agency, operating under the Ministry of Economy of Azerbaijan.

An initial allocation of 500,000 Azerbaijani manats from the 2021 state budget was provided to support the establishment of basic infrastructure, including energy supply, water, sewage, transport, communications, and fire-protection systems.

The industrial park is located near Soltanli village and covers approximately 200 hectares.

Development plans provide for the division of the territory into industrial, agricultural-processing, social, and technical zones, together with logistics and trade centers, warehouse complexes, a TIR park, customs and fuel stations, and supporting transport infrastructure.

Before construction, the area was cleared of landmines and unexploded ordnance. Initial development included the construction of administrative facilities, temporary residential and service units, internal road networks, and the installation of water and electricity supply systems.

== Investment and activities ==
As of 2024, the industrial park has 13 resident companies and one non-resident entity. Planned investments total approximately 133.8 million manats, with long-term projections for the creation of more than 2,000 permanent jobs. To date, over 20 million manats have been invested, and more than 40 permanent jobs have been created.

Priority sectors in the park include logistics and trade services, warehouse and transport infrastructure, construction materials, chemical products, specialized machinery, and the manufacture of various industrial goods.

Planned and ongoing projects within the park include technical service complexes for heavy vehicles, ready-mixed concrete and dry construction materials plants, light commercial vehicle assembly facilities, and production units for specialized equipment and metal products.
