= Azerbaijan Public Employment Agency =

Azerbaijan Public Employment Agency (APEA)
- Azərbaycan Respublikasının Dövlət Məşğulluq Agentliyi
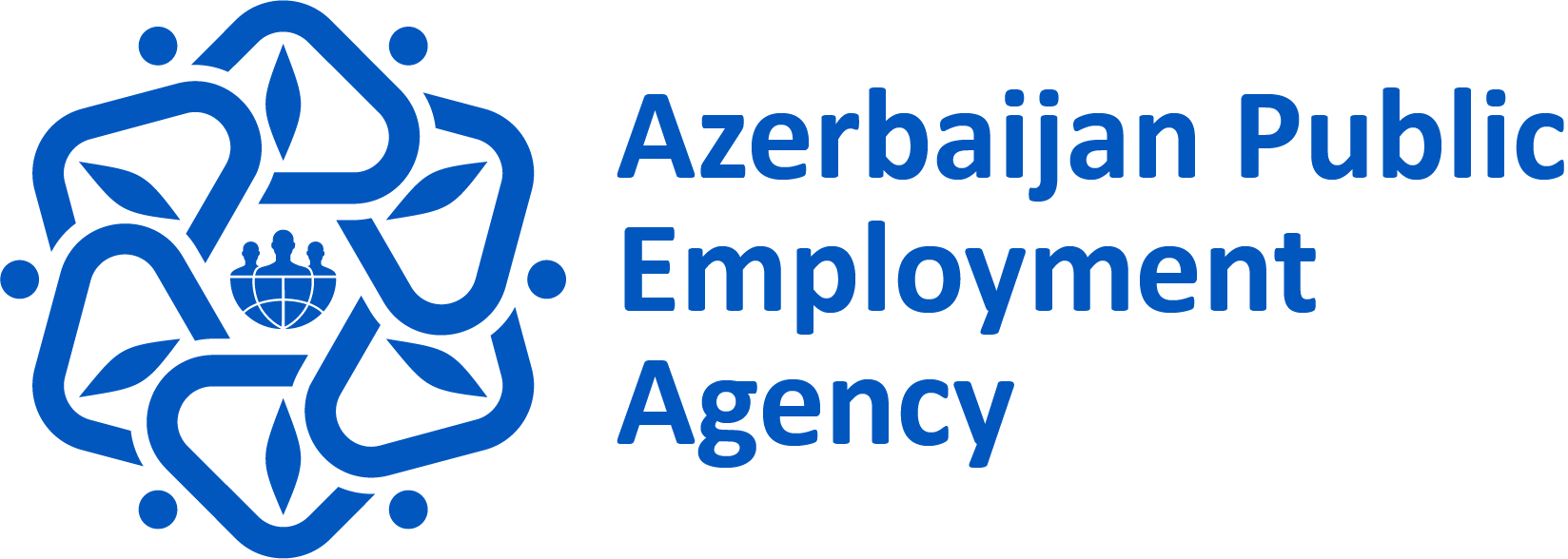

Agency overview
- Formed: August 1, 1991
- Agency executive: Mustafa Abbasbəyli
- Website: https://dma.gov.az/

Azerbaijan Public Employment Agency (APEA) is the state institution that implements various state policies in the field of ensuring full employment. Ensuring the employment of Azerbaijani citizens, the legal regulation of social protection of the unemployed and job-seeking citizens involve the National legislation and normative base consists of State Programs on socio-economic development, international agreements of which the Republic of Azerbaijan is a party, the Constitution of the Republic of Azerbaijan, the Law of the Republic of Azerbaijan on Employment, Unemployment Insurance and other relevant normative legal acts.

== History ==
Azerbaijan Public Employment Agency (APEA) was established on 1 August 1991 in accordance with presidential order No211, dated 22 July 1991. The Law on "Population Employment in the Republic of Azerbaijan" came into force on 1 October 1991, with the resolution of the Supreme Council of Azerbaijan No 147-XII dated 27 June 1991. The purpose of the law was to regulate the activity of the newly established State Employment Service. The Employment Fund was established within the State Employment Service to finance the implementation of state policy in the area of employment with the Decision No.22 of the Cabinet of Azerbaijan dated 22 July 1991.

The Constitution of Azerbaijan, adopted on 12 November 1995, provides a legal basis for the employment of Azerbaijani citizens. Within the framework of the Constitution, citizens have the right to choose any job independently.

A number of State Programs such as the "State Program on Assistance to Small and Medium Enterprises in Azerbaijan (1997-2000)", "State Program on Poverty Reduction and Economic Development in Azerbaijan (2003-2006) "," State Program on Socio-Economic Development of the Regions of Azerbaijan (2004-2008)" have been implemented by the State Employment Service to promote economic development in the country.

The program “State Program on Country Health Promotion for 2006-2009 within the framework of cooperation with ILO” was signed by the Government of Azerbaijan and the International Labour Organization in cooperation with the International Labour Organization, in Geneva on 15 November 2006. This program has been recognized for its management and execution.

The Action Plan, which was prepared by the Ministry of Labor and Social Protection of Population of Azerbaijan to support the "State Program on Azerbaijani Youth (2005-2009)," covered the programs “Preparation of National Action Plan on providing youth employment in the Republic of Azerbaijan” and “Providing youth employment" and “Studying advanced practices of developed foreign countries in the field of entrepreneurship activity and preparing proposals for its application.”

Azerbaijan is a member of the International Labour Organization (ILO) since 1992. So far Azerbaijan has ratified 57 Conventions of the Organization, including: "On forced labor"(No 29), "On discrimination in labor and employment" (No 111), "On employment policy" (No 122), “On Organization of Employment Service” (No88)," “On Professional Rehabilitation and Employment of Persons with Disabilities” (No 159).

On February 16, 2011, the State Employment Service under the Labor and Sosial Protection of population of the Republic of Azerbaijan was established on the basis of the Main Employment Office.

On December 30, 2019, the State Employment Agency was established as a public legal entity on the basis of the State Employment Service under the Ministry of Labor and Social Protection of Population.

On February 13, 2020, the President of the Republic of Azerbaijan approved the "Action Plan for the implementation of the Employment Strategy for 2020-2025"

On June 30, 2020, the "Charter of the State Employment Agency" was approved by the Decree of the President of the Republic of Azerbaijan.

== Functions of the Agency ==
Azerbaijan Public Employment Agency assists employers in the selection of staff and helps citizens find suitable jobs. The Agency provides information about supply and demand in the labor market; organizes vocational training to assist young people in choosing a profession; organizes professional training, retraining and professional development of unemployed persons and job seekers; organizes public works and labor fairs; issues unemployment status, determines unemployment benefits and payment; and organizes temporary employment for citizens through labor exchanges.

=== Organization of public works ===
One of the most important measures to ensure the employment of job seekers and unemployed citizens temporary is organization of paid public works.

Paid public work is a temporary employment activity that does not require a job-seeker or unemployed citizen a special vocational training. Public work can be renovation of the territory, streets, parks and squares; construction and repair of residential buildings, hospitals, schools, preschool institutions, dormitories and boarding houses, boarding houses for the elderly and the disabled persons, etc.; construction and reconstruction of roads and bridges, heating and boiler rooms; assistance to agricultural enterprises; elimination of consequences of natural disasters; care for the elderly and disabled persons and other socially significant works.

== Unemployment benefits ==
A status of "Unemployed" is granted to able-bodied citizens who currently have no job but are ready to work and are registered as job seekers in relevant Employment Centers, and who cannot be offered a suitable job after ten days of registration as job seeker in the Center.

Citizens who can be granted a status of unemployment are:

1. Citizens under the age of 15;
2. Those who the right to retirement (excluding pensions for children losing family head);
3. First time job seeker;
4. Those who sentenced to imprisonment;
5. Persons engaged in entrepreneurial activity, individuals engaged in individual labor activities and those who have a plot of land.

== International relations ==
A delegation of the State Employment Service under the Ministry of Labor and Social Protection of Population of Azerbaijan attended an international conference "'Youth Guarantee' Programme as Prevention of Youth Unemployment," held in Sarajevo, Bosnia and Herzegovina 17-18 October 2017 by the Labor and Employment Agency of Bosnia and Herzegovina and the World Association of Public Employment Services (WAPES).

The conference brought together representatives from different countries. A presentation about the Youth Support Program was demonstrated, as well as discussions related to its experience, impacts, development proposals and perspectives. Other presentations included "Solidarity of States in the fight against unemployment among young people" and "Integration into the labor market of young people in need of social protection and special care." Other employment programs were presented by the State Employment Services of Belgium, Croatia, Slovenia, Russia, Austria, France, Bosnia and Herzegovina, Estonia as well as other member states of the organization. Participating countries exchanged experiences and ideas about ways to participate at national and international levels to address youth unemployment.

On 02-28 October 2017, a delegation of the Ministry of Labor and Social Protection of Population of Azerbaijan visited the Republic of Lithuania as part of the twinning project "Support to the Ministry of Labor and Social Protection of Population in the Modernization of Public Employment Services in Azerbaijan". During the visit a meeting with the leadership of the Labor Exchange of Lithuania was held. On 10-16 December 2017, the delegation visited the Austrian Republic as part of the same Twinning project.

During the visit, a number of meetings were held between the Employment Service, the Kunther Steinbach Academy, the Labor and Chambers of Commerce, the Entrepreneurs Laboratories and the Agricultural Higher Education Institution in the cities of Vienna, Linz and Vishelburg in the Austrian Republic. The activities of the Austrian Employment Service, active and passive employment measures, existing electronic services, work done within the framework of social partnership, training events and subsidies for employed citizens wishing to engage in entrepreneurial activity, as well as detailed information on the training process for recruitment were also discussed.

== See also ==
- Cabinet of Azerbaijan
- Ministry of Labour and Social Protection of the Population
