= Anar Aliyev =

Anar Aliyev may refer to

- Anar Aliyev (minister) (born 1980), Azerbaijani politician; Minister of Labour and Social Protection of Population of Azerbaijan
- Anar Aliyev (soldier) (1980–2020), Azerbaijani military officer; Hero of the Patriotic War
