= Fikrat Yusifov =

Azerbaijani economist and politician

Fikrat Yusifov Fikrət Yusifov
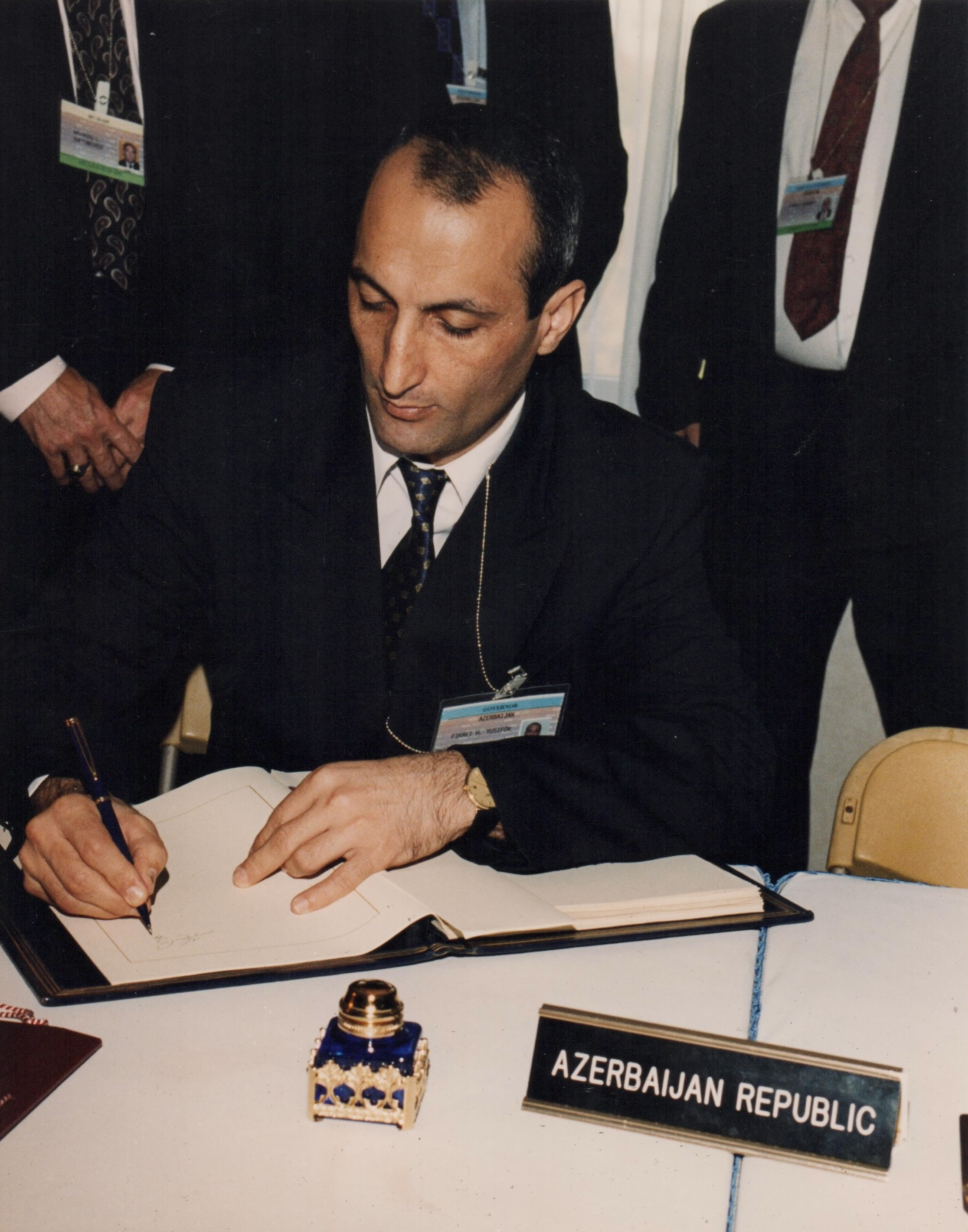

Minister of Finance of Azerbaijan
- In office 1994–1999
- President: Heydar Aliyev
- Preceded by: Saleh Mammadov
- Succeeded by: Avaz Alakbarov

First Deputy Minister of Finance of Azerbaijan Republic
- In office 1992–1994

Personal details
- Born: August 20, 1957 (age 69) Nakhichivan, Azerbaijan SSR, Soviet Union
- Education: Azerbaijan State Economic University
- Occupation: Scientist
- Profession: Economist, Politician

Fikrat Huseyn oglu Yusifov (Azerbaijani: Fikrət Hüseyn oğlu Yusifov; born August 20, 1957) is an Azerbaijani economist who served as the Minister of Finance of the Republic of Azerbaijan. He is the chairman of the International Economic Research Public Union "Ekonomiks".

== Early life ==
Fikrat Yusifov was born in Sharur, Nakhchivan. He graduated with Honorary diploma in Economics from Azerbaijan State Institute of National Economy (now Azerbaijan State Economic University) named after Dadash Bunyadzade in 1978. He worked as an economist, chief of budget department in the Ministry of Finance.

== As a Scientist ==
While working in the ministry, he continued his education in the part-time post-graduate department. In 1987 he successfully defended his candidate's thesis on "Improvement of local budgets' income markets in modern conditions" in Moscow and received the Candidate of Economic Sciences degree. After the dissertation defense, he started teaching at the Azerbaijan State University of Economics and headed the research laboratory of the institute.

In 2001, he defended his doctoral thesis at St. Petersburg University of Finance and Economics, Russia. From 2004 to 2013, he was a professor at the Finance Department of St. Petersburg State University of Finance and Economics, Russia. From 2018 to 2020, he taught as a professor at Azerbaijan State University of Economics.

He is the author of more than sixty scientific works and textbooks.

== Political Life ==
Until October 1992, he worked as the deputy dean of the "Finance and Economics" faculty of the institute. In October 1992, he was appointed as the First Deputy Minister of Finance of the Republic of Azerbaijan, and from 1994 to July 1999, he worked as the Minister of Finance of the Republic of Azerbaijan.

In 2014, he founded "Ekonomiks" International Economic Research Association in Azerbaijan and was elected its chairman.

He nominated his candidacy in the 2024 presidential elections and was registered as a presidential candidate by the Central Election Commission.
