= Anar =

Anar may refer to:

== Places ==
- Anar County, Kerman Province, Iran
- Anar, Iran, the capital of Anar County
- Anar, Ardabil, a village in Ardabil Province, Iran
- Anar, Markazi, a village in Markazi Province, Iran

== Other uses ==
- Anar, the name for pomegranate in multiple languages. Derived from Persian anaar.
- Anar Aliyev (minister) (born 1980), Azerbaijani politician
- Anar Rzayev (born 1938), Azerbaijani writer
- Anar Zeinalov (born 1985), Estonian wrestler
- İhsan Oktay Anar (born 1960), Turkish writer and illustrator
- Sabri Anar (born 1966), Turkish Chaldean Catholic archbishop
- ANAR Research, a Turkish public opinion polling company; see November 2015 Turkish general election
- Anar (album), a 2011 by Czech musician Markéta Irglová
- "Anar", a 2014 song by Israeli instrumental-based power-trio TATRAN
- Anar, a type of firecracker in India

== See also ==
- Annar, figure in Norse mythology
