= Soltanlı =

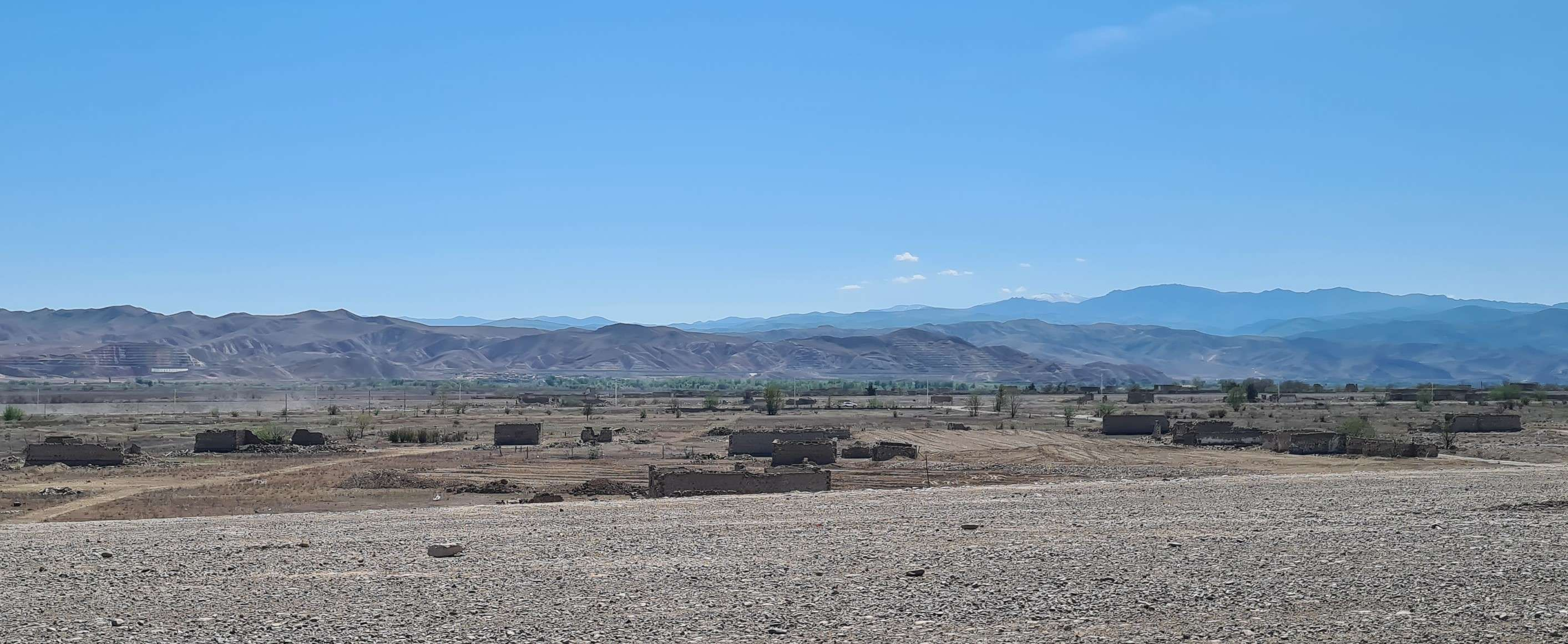
- Soltanly village in 2023

- Location within Azerbaijan
- Coordinates: 39°15′41″N 47°02′55″E
- Country: Azerbaijan
- District: Jabrayil
- Time zone: UTC+4 (AZT)

Soltanlı (Azerbaijani: Soltanly) is a village in the Jabrayil District of Azerbaijan, located on Araz plain, 14 km south of the city of Jabrayil.

== Toponym ==
The name of the village is associated with the name of Soltanly tribe, a branch of the Shahsevens. People often call the village Boyuk Soltanly.

== History ==
During the years of the Russian Empire, the village of Soltanly was part of Jabrayil district, Elizavetpol province.

During the Soviet years, the village was part of the village council of the same name, Jabrayil district, Azerbaijan SSR.

The village was captured by Armenian forces in the First Karabakh War and was destroyed.

On 19 October 2020, during the Second Karabakh War, the Azerbaijani Army regained the control over the village of Soltanly and liberated it. According to Azerbaijani President Ilham Aliyev, due to the presence of powerful fortifications on the territory of the village, fierce battles for Soltanly lasted for several days.

In May 2022, the construction of a railway station began in the village.

Since the village was completely destroyed during the occupation, the foundation of a new village was laid here on November 24, 2023. The groundbreaking ceremony was attended by the Minister of Foreign Affairs and Trade of Hungary Péter Szijjártó, Azerbaijan’s Minister of Labor and Social Protection of Population Sahil Babayev, Chairman of the State Committee for Urban Planning and Architecture Anar Guliyev, Special Representative of the President of the Republic of Azerbaijan in Jabrayil, Gubadli and Zangilan districts, which are included in Eastern Zangezur economic region Vahid Hajiyev.

== Population ==
According to the “Code of statistical data of the Transcaucasian region population, extracted from the family lists of 1886”, in the village of Soltanly, Soltanly rural district, Jabrayil district, there were 75 dym where lived 416 Azerbaijanis who were Shiites by religion, 13 of them were representatives of the clergy, the rest were peasants.

According to the “Caucasian Calendar” for 1912, 456 people lived in the village of Soltanly, Karyagin district, mostly Azerbaijanis, indicated in the calendar as “Tatars”.

In 1983, in the village lived 1885 people. The village population was engaged in livestock farming, wheat cultivation, cotton growing, viticulture and sericulture.

== Gallery ==
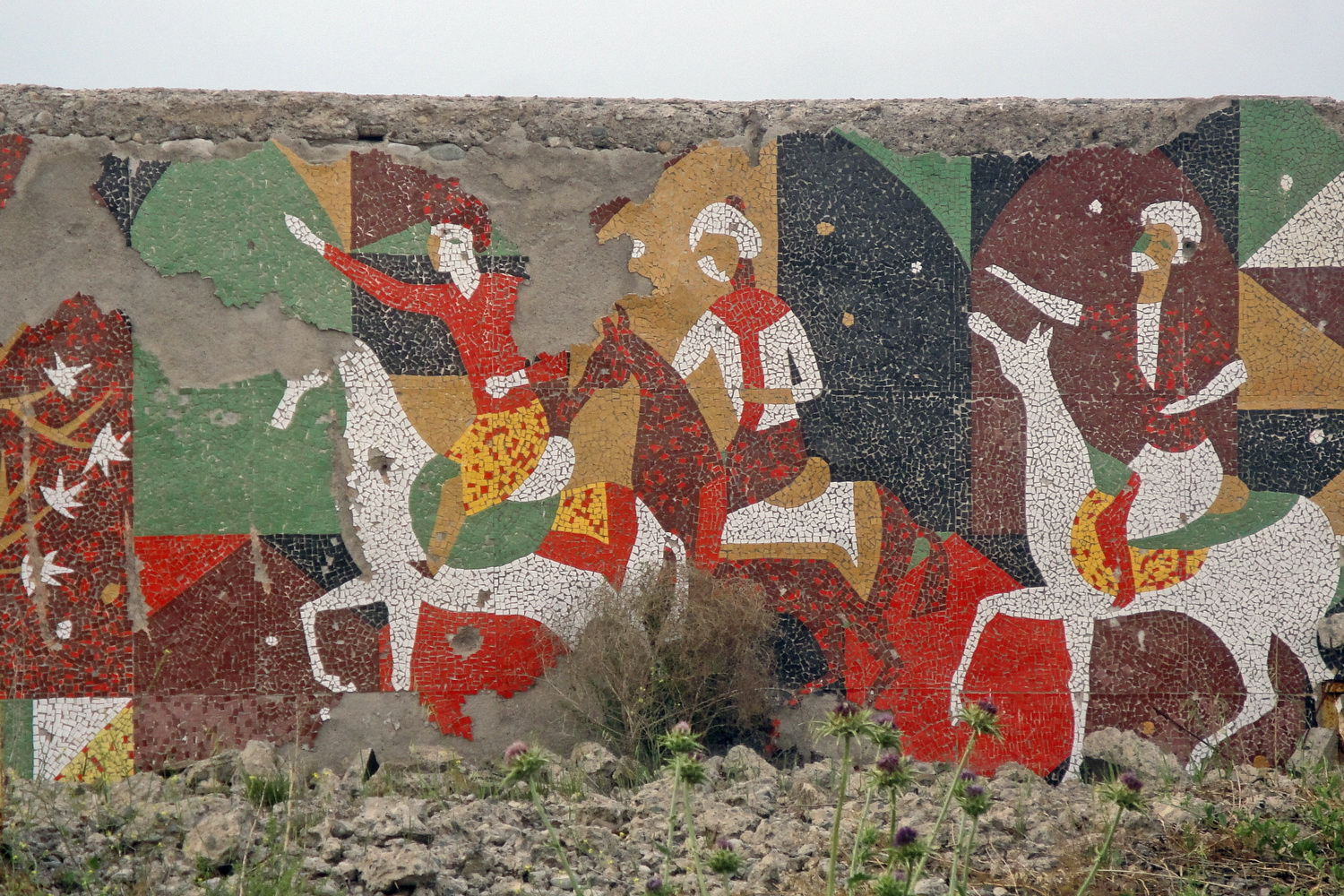
Remains of a bus stop in the village of Soltanly (2014)

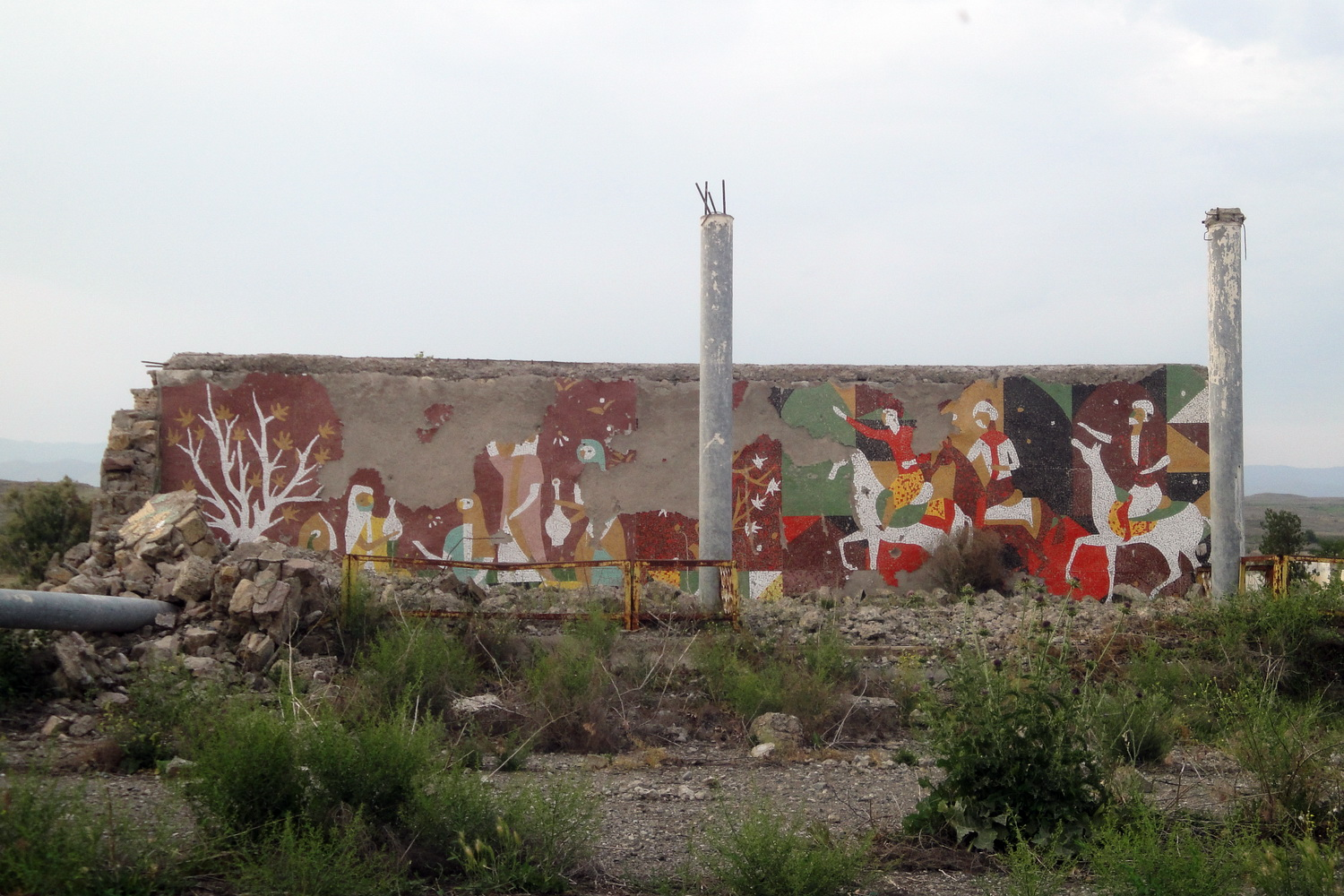
Remains of a bus stop in the village of Soltanly (2014)

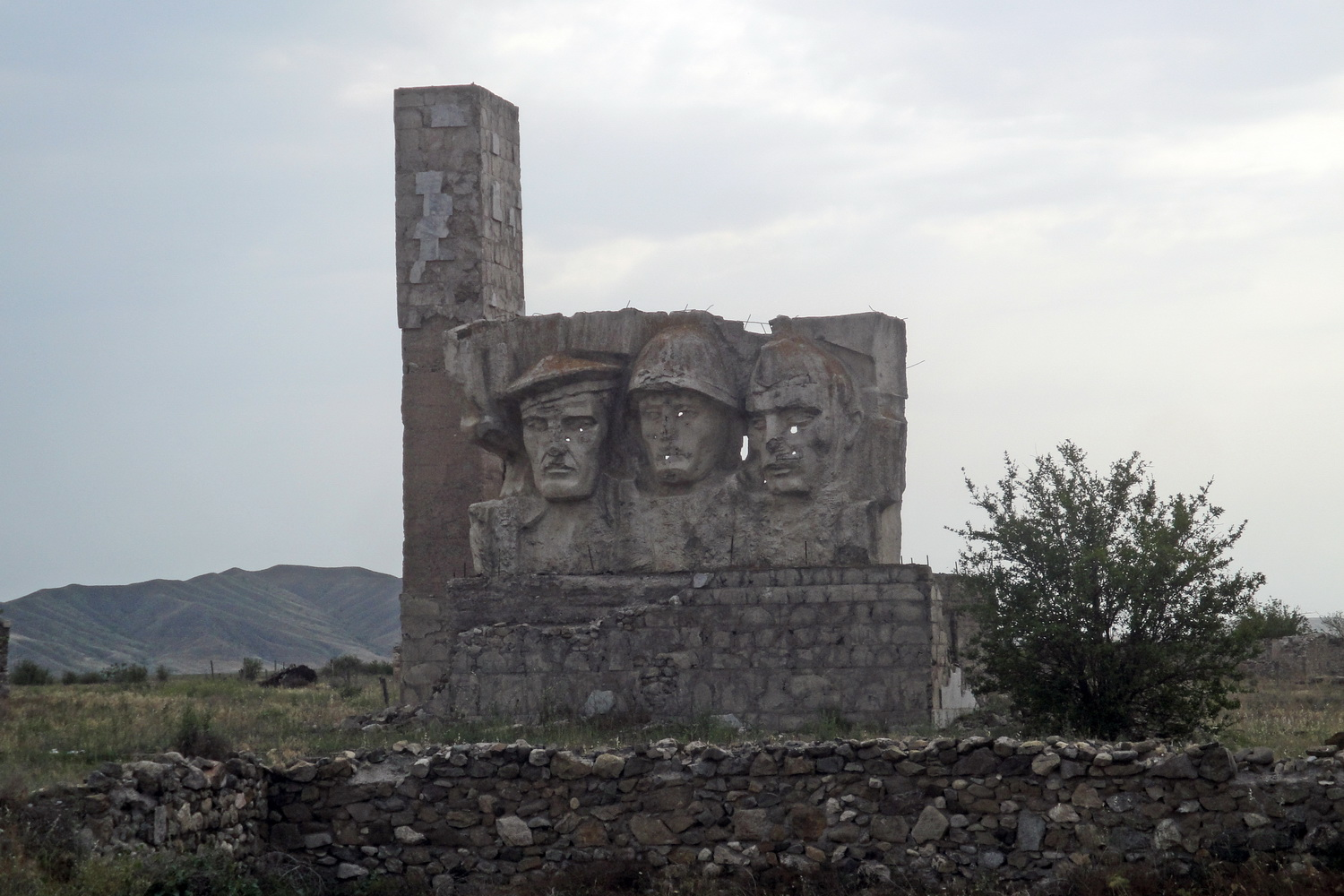
A dilapidated memorial to those who fell in the World War II in the village of Soltanly (2014)
