= SOFAZ Tower =

- Alternative names: State Oil Fund of Azerbaijan Tower

General information
- Status: Completed
- Type: Skyscraper
- Architectural style: Modern
- Location: Nizami, Baku, Azerbaijan
- Coordinates: 40.4141°N 49.9019°E
- Construction started: 2011
- Completed: 2014
- Cost: 84.916.000 $

Height
- Height: 140 m (460 ft)

Technical details
- Floor count: 24
- Floor area: 27.000 m2

Design and construction
- Architecture firm: Inter Art Etudes (France) and M.D.M. LLC (Azerbaijan).
- Developer: N.V. BESIX S.A.

Other information
- Parking: 150

SOFAZ Tower is a multi-story building located in Baku, the capital of Azerbaijan. The skyscraper is the administrative building of the State Oil Fund of the Republic of Azerbaijan (SOFAZ), the project incorporates the latest technological innovations that are in line with the highest international standards and elements of the 9 carpet schools in Azerbaijan.

== History ==
To build a new administrative building of the State Oil Fund of Azerbaijan (SOFAZ) under the Order No. 367s of the Cabinet of Ministers of the Republic of Azerbaijan dated December 29, 2009, 0.64 hectares of land in 6th Kondalan Street, Nizami district, were transferred to the balance of the Fund. On that day, President Ilham Aliyev attended the solemn laying ceremony of his foundation.

On December 20, 2011, N.V. Besix S.A. a bilateral agreement on construction was signed with the company-builder. After that, the active phase of the construction of the SOFAZ Tower building started. N.V. Besix S.A. the company won the tender as a result of the procurement tender following Article 48 of the Law of the Republic of Azerbaijan "On public procurement" based on the agreement of the State Procurement Agency of the Republic of Azerbaijan and on December 20, 2011, the State Oil Fund and Besix-Az Besix consortium a relevant procurement contract was signed for €84,916,000. Local and foreign subcontractors have been involved in the construction of the building by the general contractor.

The construction and design work of the building has been completed over 5 years. The construction project of the building was developed by the French company "Inter Art Etudes". The construction process was carried out under the auspices of the American company AECOM, "N.V. Besix SA"

== Details of the project ==
The building consists of 24 floors and 2 underground floors, with a height of 117 meters and a roof terrace of 140 meters. The total area of the building is 13,000 square meters. Along with a two-story underground parking, a new 26-storey building features a three-story Podium, 18 open-type office floors, three technical floors, and a library, a museum, a conference hall for 200 people, meeting rooms, restaurants, etc. available.

The building has a double façade. It is designed to meet the requirements of sustainability and energy efficiency, which considers the application of modern technological systems, as well as the concept of intellectual technological infrastructure, and meets the requirements of the Green Building category. The interior design of the building is based on A classroom office building standards, considering the national cultural heritage of Azerbaijan.
