= Labour rights in Azerbaijan =

Labour rights in Azerbaijan are substantially constrained. Labor rights activists face repression in Azerbaijan. Azerbaijani law nominally allows the formation of labor unions and the right to strike, but in practice, most unions collaborate with the authoritarian regime, many categories of workers are prohibited from striking, and most major industries are dominated by state-owned enterprises where the government sets working conditions.

According to a report by the U.S. Bureau of International Labor Affairs, Azerbaijan has made "minimal advancement" in child labor protection and that "children in Azerbaijan are subjected to the worst forms of child labor".

In 2022, the European Court of Human Rights ruled against the government of Azerbaijan for failing to conduct an effective investigation into credible complaints of forced labor and human trafficking. In the case that the ECHR ruled on, the company that engaged in forced labor and human trafficking appeared to be owned by the wife of Azerbaijan minister Azad Rahimov. Credible complaints had been brought to senior government officials and agencies, yet they dismissed the complaints and refused to investigate them.

== International Labour Organization and Azerbaijan ==
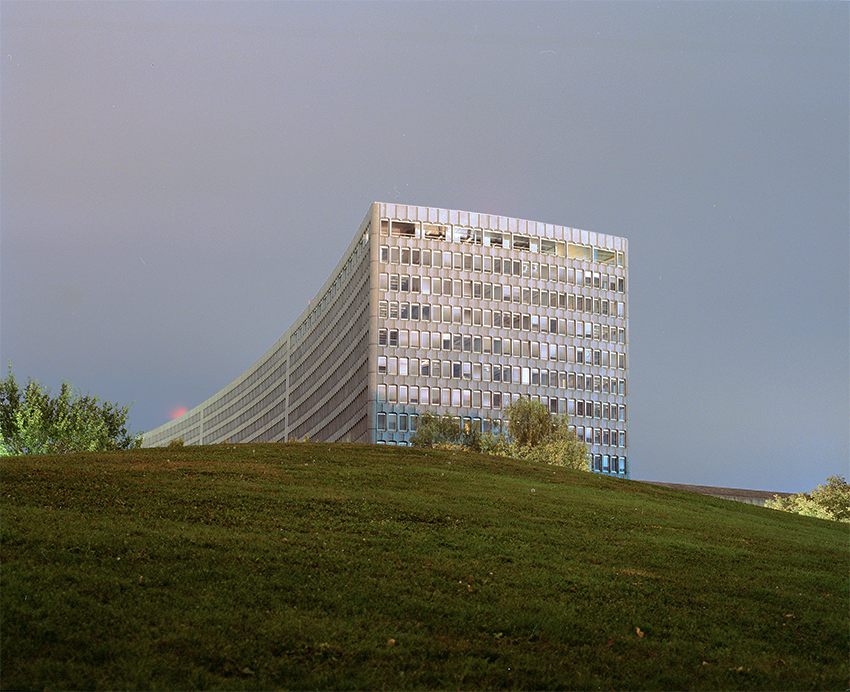
International Labour Organization

Azerbaijan became a member of the International Labour Organization in May 1992. The ILO opened its local office in Azerbaijan in 2003. Until the end of September 2017, Azerbaijan has ratified 58 Conventions and 1 Additional Protocol within the framework of the ILO. All fundamental and governance conventions of ILO have been ratified by Azerbaijan. On 18–19 November 2010, Baku, the capital of Azerbaijan, played host to the 3rd Conference of the Regional Alliance of Labour Inspections. Azerbaijan's Ministry of Labour and Social Protection of Population of, the International Association of Labour Inspections, the ILO, and the World Bank together organized the conference.

== See also ==
- Human rights in Azerbaijan
- Children's rights in Azerbaijan
- Ministry of Labour and Social Protection of the Population
- Labor Code of Azerbaijan
