= Ministry of Finance (Azerbaijan) =

Government ministry of Azerbaijan

Ministry of Finance of Azerbaijan Republic
- Azərbaycan Respublikasının Maliyyə Nazirliyi
- Coat of arms of Azerbaijan

Agency overview
- Formed: October 21, 1918
- Jurisdiction: Government of Azerbaijan
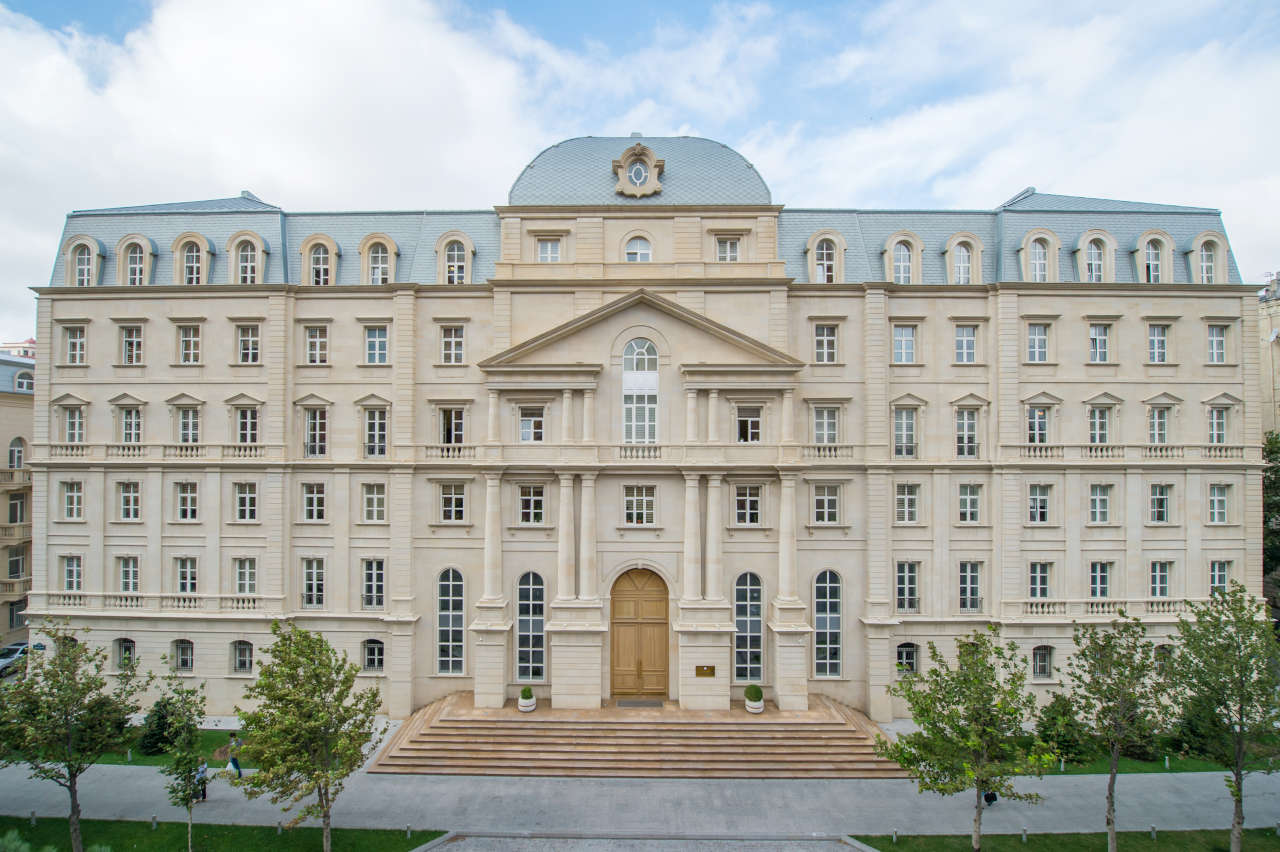
- Headquarters: 83 Samad Vurgun Avenue, Baku, Azerbaijan Republic AZ1022
- Agency executive: Sahil Babayev, Minister of Finance; Azer Bayramov, Deputy Minister
- Website: www.maliyye.gov.az

The Ministry of Finance of Azerbaijan Republic (Azerbaijani: Azərbaycan Respublikasının Maliyyə Nazirliyi) is a governmental agency within the Cabinet of Azerbaijan in charge of regulating the financial sector in Azerbaijan Republic. The ministry is headed by Sahil Babayev.

== History ==
The office of Minister of Finance was established on May 18, 1918, when Azerbaijan Democratic Republic declared independence. The Minister of Finance was one of members of the first cabinet. The Ministry of Finance itself, however, was formally established on October 21, 1918. With incorporation of Azerbaijan into USSR, the Ministry of Finance was subdued to Soviet Ministry of Finances. On August 4, 1956, and October 29, 1971, the statute of the ministry was revised by Council of Ministers decrees No. 385 and No. 358, respectively. The main functions of the ministry were collection of financial means to be distributed within the economic sector of Azerbaijan SSR. The current activity of the Ministry of Finance is regulated by the Statute about the Ministry of Finance of the Republic of Azerbaijan approved by Presidential Decree No. 271 on February 4, 2000.

== Structure ==
The Ministry of Finance is the central executive power body within the borders of the Republic of Azerbaijan which implements the financial policy of the state and arranges the controlling of state finance. According to Decree 48 of February 9, 2009 of the President of the Republic of Azerbaijan, the ministry carrying out its duties. Ministry's apparatus, State Financial Control Service, Public Debt Management Agency, State Insurance Control Service, State Treasury Agency, State Service controlling Precious Metals and Stones, local agencies and other subordinate departments of the Ministry and the corresponding institution of the Autonomous Republic of Nakhchivan constitute the system the Ministry of Finance. Based on Decision 55 of April 6, 2010 of the Cabinet of Ministers of the Republic of Azerbaijan, the ministry does not involve Data Centre and ‘Finance and Accounting Magazine Editorial Office’ LLC, Financial Science and Education Center which are considered as the dependent bodies of the Ministry of Finance. The ministry is headed by the minister and two deputy ministers. Functions of the ministry are improvement of state policies on finance, budgeting and taxes; ensuring stability of state finances and development of financial markets in the country; attracting foreign creditors to Azerbaijani economy; improvement of budgeting, tax forecasting, financial mechanisms; ensuring financial control over budgetary funds and spending; provision of state budget funds management and controlling movement of funds within Azerbaijan.

== Subordinate bodies ==
- Financial Science and Training Center
- Data processing center
- Baku Congress Center
- "Finance and Accounting" magazine edition

== List of ministers of finance ==
=== Azerbaijan Democratic Republic ===
- Nasib Yusifbeyli, May 1918 – June 1918
- Abdulali bey Amirjanov, June 1918 – October 1918
- Mammad Hasan Hajinski, October 1918 – December 1918
- Ivan Protasov, December 1918 – March 1919
- Aliagha Hasanov, March 1919 – December 1919
- Rashid Khan Kaplanov, 1919 – 1920

=== Azerbaijan SSR ===
- N. Tagiyev, 1920 – 1922
- Mirzabekyan, 1923 – 1924
- Mirza Davud Huseynov, 1925 – 1925
- A. Ibrahimov, 1926 – 1926
- T. Aliyev, 1927 – 1930
- A. Mammadov, 1931 – 1931
- N. Ibrahimov, 1932 – 1934
- Atakishiyev, 1935 – 1935
- N. Tagiyev, 1936 – 1937
- Mirabutalib Samadov, 1938 – 1949
- Rza Sadikhov, 1950 – 1957
- Gurban Khalilov, 1958 – 1969
- Bakhshali Bakhshaliyev, 1970 – 1987
- Bedir Garayev, 1987 – 1991

=== Azerbaijan Republic ===
- Bedir Garayev, 1991 – 1992
- Saleh Mammadov, 1992 – 1993
- Fikrat Yusifov, 1994 – July 11, 1999
- Avaz Alakbarov, July 11, 1999 – April 18, 2006
- Samir Sharifov, April 18, 2006 – 2025
- Sahil Babayev, February 6, 2025 – Incumbent

== Sharifov corruption allegations ==
Several news articles have discussed a correlation between Minister Sharifov's position in government and corruption:

=== Intelligence agent allegations ===
Sharifov served as a human asset (agent) for Russian, Turkish, and American intelligence services, according to information leaked by sources inside the Russian intelligence community that was published in the Ukrainian newspaper Gordonua on March 9, 2016.

Turkish intelligence officers first recruited Sharifov between 1989 and 1990. At some point shortly after 1990, the CIA recruited him.

Sharifov studied at the Kiev Shevchenko State University. While a student, the KGB recruited him with leverage. The KGB caught Sharifov illegally buying and selling foreign currency on the black market. In lieu of prosecution, the KGB got Sharifov to work for them. After Sharifov graduated, he worked for Azerbaijan's Ministry of Foreign Trade in South Yemen. He worked in a unit responsible for transporting Soviet military weapons and equipment to South Yemen. While working at that position, he secretly served as a human asset of the KGB's First Chief Directorate.

In 1990, two shipments of weapons going from the Soviet Union to South Yemen disappeared. The KGB investigated. Their investigation concluded that “ a “hostile foreign intelligence agency” had learned about the transports from a “mole” recruited among the Soviet employees in South Yemen who had knowledge about the transports.” The KGB found evidence that Sharifov had made been making contact with Turkish intelligence officers while working for the KGB at the South Yemen station.

The Soviet government removed Sharifov from his position and flew him to Moscow for interrogation. The Soviet Union collapsed shortly thereafter, Sharifov moved on to a new job.

=== State Oil Fund of Azerbaijan (SOFA) ===
In July 2004, APS Review Downstream Trends reported: “The transparency of the State Oil Fund of Azerbaijan (SOFA), which is headed by Samir Sharifov who is among key figures surrounding the new leader in Baku . . . Corruption remains widespread.”

=== New petroleum wealth ===
In 2005, Nefte Compass reported: “Fresh from elections that have been judged as less than perfect, Azerbaijan is getting on with the business of raking in the oil money, bracing itself for a flood of "petrodollars" that at current prices could exceed $150 billion over the next 20 years. Concerns abound that the windfall will be squandered through corruption rather than pumped into alleviating poverty. . . the fund's chairman [is] Samir Sharifov . . .”

=== Systemic corruption ===
In 2002, APS Review Gas Market Trends reported: “There is a big question mark about Azerbaijan's future . . . Petroleum wealth without governmental accountability in the coming years will lead to more corruption and a population impoverished further. . . In October 1997 the British Ambassador, Roger Thomas, told a conference organised by the Baku chamber of commerce that corruption in Azerbaijan was getting out of hand. He spoke of "the hijacking of assets and wealth by a few people while a large part of the country goes empty-handed". He said foreign companies were being "frightened away" from Azerbaijan by excessive and arbitrary taxation. He said corruption, in the form of "unofficial overheads", provided "a further disincentive to invest". . . The fund's board of directors [is] led by Aliyev-appointed banker Samir Sharifov . . .”

=== Other controversies ===
Article pages on CBS News and Foreign Policy Journal include the following information about Minister Sharifov:

- "The United States is encouraging Aliyev to appoint Samir Sharifov to be ... as a governor for Azerbaijan, clearly indicate a pattern of corruption."
- "There have been whispers of treason, bribery, and corruption under Minister of Finance, Samir Sharifov, but to move into terrorism is disgusting."

== See also ==
- Cabinet of Azerbaijan
- Economy of Azerbaijan
