= State Treasury Agency (Azerbaijan) =

The State Treasury Agency of the Republic of Azerbaijan operating under Ministry of Finance is a state body that is accountable for provision of payment of budget revenues into the budget implementation of state budget cash, targeted use of expenditures in accordance with single budget classification.

The statute of State Treasury Agency of the Republic of Azerbaijan was approved on 9 February 2009 according to the Presidential Decree No.48.
