= Jil, Armenia =

Village in Gegharkunik, Armenia

Jil Ջիլ
- Location within Armenia Location within Gegharkunik
- Coordinates: 40°27′16″N 45°27′13″E
- Country: Armenia
- Province: Gegharkunik
- Municipality: Shoghakat
- Founded: 12th century

Population (2011)
  - Total: 615
- Time zone: UTC+4 (AMT)

Jil (Armenian: Ջիլ) is a village in the Shoghakat Municipality of the Gegharkunik Province of Armenia, located near the northern shore of Lake Sevan. Most of the beach in close proximity to the village remains uninhabited with a strip of forested land that lines the shore.

== History ==
Two kilometers north of the village is the Dasht Ler Castle (also called the Dashti-ler fort) from the 1st millennium BC.

The village was founded in the 12th century. On a German map from 1902 it is mentioned as the main settlement in the area between present-day villages Shoghakat and Mets Masrik.

The village was populated by Azerbaijanis before the exodus of Azerbaijanis from Armenia after the outbreak of the Nagorno-Karabakh conflict. In 1988-1989 Armenian refugees from Azerbaijan settled in the village.

== Notable people ==
- Avaz Alakbarov, Azerbaijani politician and scientist, former Minister of Finance of the Republic of Azerbaijan
- Khalaf Khalafov, Azerbaijani diplomat, Deputy Minister of Foreign Affairs of the Republic of Azerbaijan
