= Saleh Mammadov =

Azerbaijani engineer

- Saleh Məmmədov
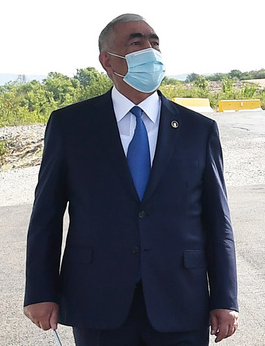
- Saleh Mammadov, President of the Azerbaijan Handball Federation.

Chairman of the Board of the Azerbaijan State Agency of Motor Roads
- Incumbent
- Assumed office 28 December 2015
- President: Ilham Aliyev

President of the Azerbaijan Handball Federation
- Incumbent
- Assumed office 1 December 2016
- President: Ilham Aliyev
- Preceded by: Heydar Babayev

Personal details
- Born: 1958 (age 67–68) Tartar District, Azerbaijani SSR, Soviet Union
- Party: New Azerbaijan Party
- Children: 4
- Parent: Arshad Mammadov (father)
- Profession: Engineer

Military service
- Allegiance: Soviet Union
- Branch/service: Soviet Army
- Years of service: 1980–1982

Saleh Arshad oglu Mammadov (Azerbaijani: Saleh Ərşad oğlu Məmmədov; born 1958) is an Azerbaijani engineer, and the Chairman of the Board of the Azerbaijan State Agency of Motor Roads, President of the Azerbaijan Handball Federation. He was awarded the title of Honoured Engineer of Azerbaijan, as well as the Taraggi Medal and the Shohrat Order.

== Early life and education ==
Saleh Arshad oglu Mammadov was born in 1958 in the Tartar District of the Azerbaijani SSR, which was then part of the Soviet Union. After graduating from a local high school there, he entered the Industry and Civil Engineering Faculty of the Azerbaijan Institute of Civil Engineers, where he graduated in 1980. Mammadov received higher education in law later on, graduating from the Law Faculty of Baku State University in 2015.

== Career ==
Mammadov began his career in 1980 as an engineer in the Technical Inventory Bureau of the Azerbaijani Ministry of Housing and Communal Services. After serving in the Soviet Army from 1980 to 1982, he continued his career in 1982 as an engineer in the Central Technical Inventory Bureau of the same ministry. From 1982 to 1991 Mammadov was an engineer, chief engineer and chief of the 1st Road Construction Department of the Yoltamirtikinti, from 1991 to 1993, he was the chief of the 3rd Road Construction Department of the Azerneft Road Construction and Repair Trust. From 1994 to 1995, Mammadov worked as a head of Azkommunkomplekttekhnika Production Association. From 1995 to 2003, he worked as Deputy Chief of the Bridge Construction Trust of Azeravtoyol State Company, Chief of the 1st Local Motor Roads Department, Chief of the 4th Siyazan Road Maintenance Department, and Chief of the 1st Road Maintenance Department. From 2003 to 2015, Mammadov was the head of the 1st Road Maintenance Department of the Yolnagliyyatservis Department of the Azerbaijani Ministry of Transport. In February 2007, Yolnagliyyatservis was disestablished and Azeryolservis Open Joint Stock Company replaced the service's functions, where he worked as the head of the 1st Road Maintenance Department. On 19 February 2015, Mammadov was appointed First Deputy Chairman of Azeryolservis OJSC. By the decree of the President of Azerbaijan, Ilham Aliyev, he was appointed Chairman of Azeryolservis Open Joint-Stock Company on 28 December 2015.

During the first years of Mammadov's chairmanship, the construction of the Aghsu–Kurdamir–Imishli and the reconstruction of Goychay–Ujar highway was completed. He led the operation of a large part of the E-119, AH-8, M-1, M-4 and M-2 highways, which were in general use in Azerbaijan, as well as the operation of local roads. During Mammadov's tenure, a decrease in the number of traffic accidents was observed in Azerbaijan.

Mammadov was appointed the President of the Azerbaijan Handball Federation on 1 December 2016.

== Personal life ==
Mammadov is married and has four children. He is a member of the New Azerbaijan Party.

== Awards ==
- Mammadov was awarded the Taraggi Medal 22 September 2010, by the decree of the President of Azerbaijan, Ilham Aliyev.
- Mammadov was awarded the title of Honored Engineer of Azerbaijan on 10 April 2012, "for services to the development of the construction industry."
- Mammadov was awarded the Shohrat Order on 21 February 2018, "for services in the construction and operation of roads."

== Sources ==
- "Məmmədov Saleh Ərşad oğlu" [Mammadov Saleh Arshad oglu]. Encyclopedia of Azerbaijan Construction Complex (in Azerbaijani). Vol. 5th. Baku: Yeni Poligrafist. 2015.
