= Azerbaijan Women's Handball Championship =

The Azerbaijan Women's Handball Championship is the premier league for women's handball clubs in Azerbaijan. First held in 1993 following the collapse of the Soviet Union, it has been dominated since by ABU Baku, 10 titles.

== List of champions ==
- 1993 Halita Baku
- 1994 Halita Baku
- 1995 Halita Baku
- 1996 [[]]
- 1997 [[]]
- 1998 [[]]
- 1999 [[]]
- 2000 [[]]
- 2001 ABU Baku
- 2002 ABU Baku
- 2003 ABU Baku
- 2004 ABU Baku
- 2005 ABU Baku
- 2006 ABU Baku
- 2007 ABU Baku
- 2008 ABU Baku
- 2009 ABU Baku
- 2010 ABU Baku
- 2011 ABU Baku
- 2012 ABU Baku
- 2013 ABU Baku
- 2014 ABU Baku
- 2015 ABU Baku
- 2016 ABU Baku
- 2017 ABU Baku
- 2018 ABU Baku
- 2019 ABU Baku
