= State Oil Fund of Azerbaijan =

Sovereign wealth fund of the Republic of Azerbaijan

State Oil Fund of the Republic of Azerbaijan
- Azərbaycan Respublikasının Dövlət Neft Fondu
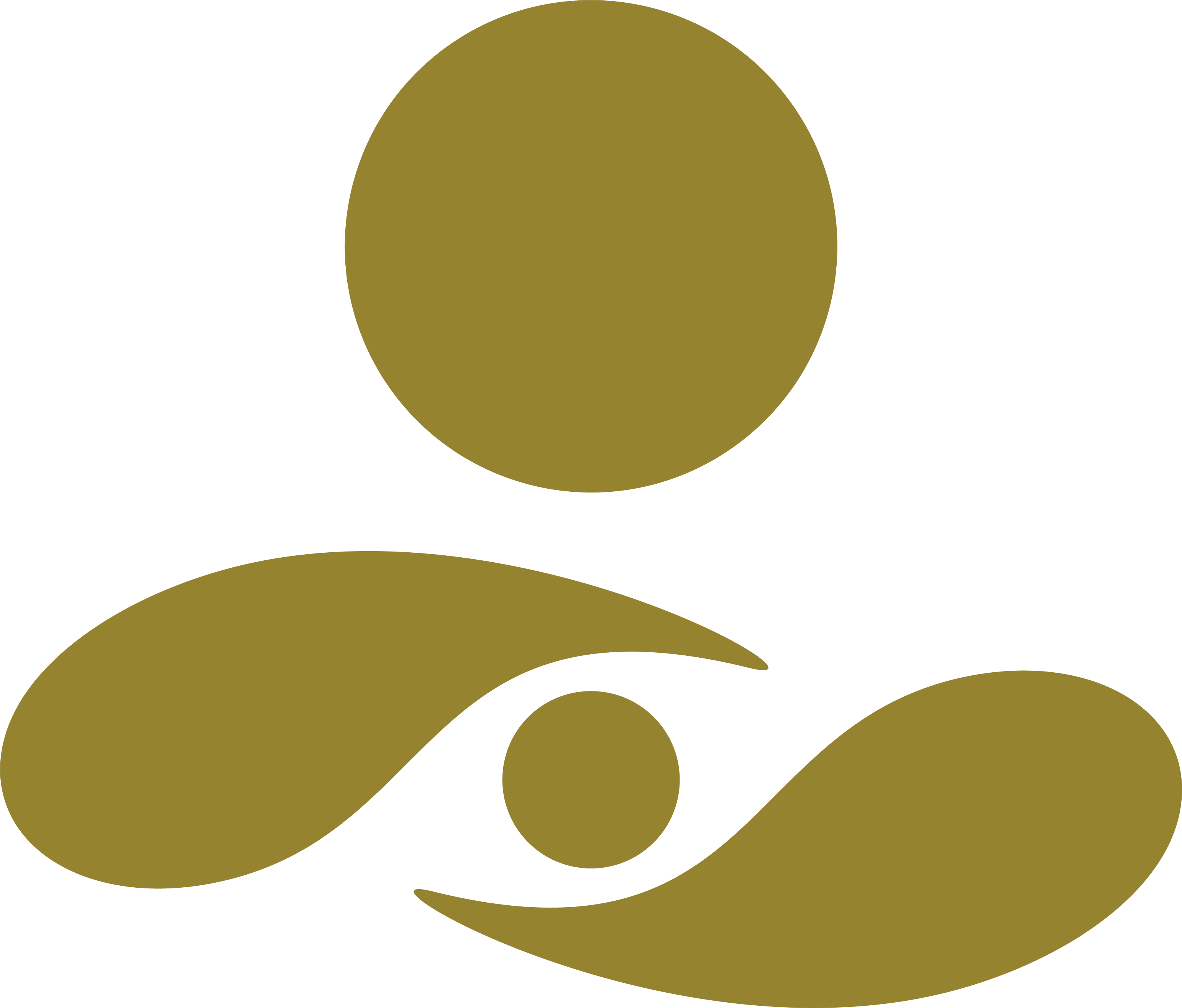

- SOFAZ Tower at Heydar Aliyev Ave
- Abbreviation: SOFAZ
- Established: December 29, 1999; 26 years ago
- Type: Sovereign wealth fund
- Headquarters: Nizami, Baku, Azerbaijan
- Executive Director: Israfil Mammadov
- Awards: United Nations Public Service Awards; EITI Award
- Website: www.oilfund.az

The State Oil Fund of the Republic of Azerbaijan (Azerbaijani: Azərbaycan Respublikasının Dövlət Neft Fondu), also known by its abbreviation SOFAZ, is a sovereign wealth fund of Azerbaijan founded in December 1999.

Nearly all the fund's revenues come from Azerbaijan's oil and gas exports. SOFAZ invests internationally and holds assets in more than 60 countries, including listed securities as well as infrastructure and renewable energy projects.

== History and organization ==
The State Oil Fund of the Republic of Azerbaijan (SOFAZ) was established by Heydar Aliyev's Decree No. 240 dated December 29, 1999. Statute of the State Oil Fund was approved by the Decree of the President of the Republic of Azerbaijan No. 434 dated December 29, 2000. Funds from SOFAZ are frequently transferred to make up for state deficits.

Azerbaijani banks purchased nearly $5 billion foreign currency from SOFAZ in 2016. In 2018, SOFAZ sold more than $5.8 billion foreign currency to Azerbaijani banks.

In 2020, the Azeri-Chirag-Gunashli (ACG) oil fields recorded their lowest profits since 2003 at $3.52 billion, with SOFAZ receiving about $5 billion from oil sales that year. In 2022, revenue from oil and gas sales of the ACG and Shah Deniz gas field increased by 65.4% to $11.3 billion compared to 2021. In 2024, the revenue generated by SOFAZ from the sale of oil from the ACG field was US$ 5,725 billion. SOFAZ owns 25% of the shares amongst BP, ExxonMobil, Amoco, Unocal, Statoil, McDermott and others.

As of 30 June 2026, SOFAZ reported assets under management of $72.6 billion, reflecting an increase of 16.9% since the beginning of the year, driven by investment returns, currency movements, and asset allocation.

SOFAZ Executive Director Israfil Mammadov signed a Memorandum of Understanding with Hassana Investment Company in October 2024 to discuss investment in Saudi Arabia.

In 2024, SOFAZ sold $7.128 billion foreign currency for 12.1 billion manats.

=== Executive Director ===
The operational management of the Fund's activities is carried out by the Executive Director, who is appointed and dismissed by the President. As of 2018, the executive director reports to the President. There have been three executive directors since 2001:

- Samir Sharifov (January 3, 2001 – April 18, 2006)
- Shahmar Movsumov (May 15, 2006 – November 29, 2019)
- Israfil Mammadov (November 29, 2019 – present)

=== Supervisory Board ===
The President of Azerbaijan appoints the members of a Supervisory Board, who are de facto powerless. The board comprises 7 key officials including the Prime Minister, Deputy Speaker of the National Assembly, Assistants to the President of Azerbaijan – Head of Economic Affairs and Innovative Development Policy, and Head of Economic Policy and Industrial Affairs departments of the Presidential Administration, Minister of Finance, Minister of Economy, and the Chairman of the Central Bank of Azerbaijan.

=== Subsidiaries ===
SOFAZ owns 12 subsidiaries. Five are located on the channel island of Jersey, four in Luxembourg and one each in Russia, France and Japan.

== Others ==
In June 2024, SOFAZ announced a plan to invest US$100 million in Dubai-based GEMS Education.

Since 2013, SOFAZ owns a 2.95% stake in state-owned Russian VTB Bank until now this investment has paid USD 57.3 million in dividends to SOFAZ.

In 2025 SOFAZ announced an investment in Italian rail operator Italo – Nuovo Trasporto Viaggiatori S.p.A via a fund vehicle led by U.S.-based Global Infrastructure Partners (GIP) which is part of BlackRock.

In May 2025 SOFAZ invested a €20 million stake in the private equity fund Azzurra Capital Fund I, managed by the company Azzurra Capital, based in Dubai.

In July 2025, SOFAZ acquired a 49% stake in 14 solar power plants in Italy operated by Enfinity Global, with a combined capacity of 402 MW, operating under long-term power purchase agreements.

In October 2025, SOFAZ invested £50 million in London Gatwick Airport alongside Global Infrastructure Partners, part of BlackRock, as part of a major infrastructure investment in Europe.

SOFAZ works with major global asset managers, including BlackRock, Brookfield, JP Morgan, Franklin Templeton, Blackstone, Neuberger Berman and KKR, to access large-scale international investments.

== Awards ==
- United Nations Public Service Awards (2007)
- EITI Award (2009)

== Source ==
- Aslanli, Kenan (2015). "Fiscal sustainability and the State Oil Fund in Azerbaijan". Journal of Eurasian Studies. 6 (2): 114–121. doi:10.1016/j.euras.2015.03.004. ISSN 1879-3665.
