= Azerbaijan Premier Handball League =

- Sport: Handball
- Founded: 1993
- No. of teams: 12
- Country: Azerbaijan
- Confederation: EHF (Europe)
- Most recent champion: (2015)
- Level on pyramid: 1
- International cups: Champions League; EHF Cup

The Azerbaijan Handball Premier League is the top men's team handball league in Azerbaijan.

== Past champions ==
- 1992 :
- 1993 :
- 1994 : Umud Baku
- 1995 :
- 1996 :
- 1997 :
- 1998 :
- 1999 :
- 2000 :
- 2001 :
- 2002 : HC Spartak Baku
- 2003 : DIN Baku
- 2004 : DIN Baku (2)
- 2005 : DIN Baku (3)
- 2006 : DIN Baku (4)
- 2007 : DIN Baku (5)
- 2008 :
- 2009 :
- 2010 :
- 2011 :
- 2012 :
- 2013 :
- 2014 :
- 2015 : AZAL Baku
- 2016 : Mahsul-Nasimi
- 2017 : Mahsul-Nasimi (2)
- 2018 : HC Baku

| | Club | Titles | Year |
|---|---|---|---|
| 1. | DIN Baku | 5+ | 2003, 2004, 2005, 2006, 2007 |
| 2. | Mahsul-Nasimi | 2+ | 2016, 2017 |
| 3. | Umud Baku | 1+ | 1994 |
| | HC Spartak Baku | 1+ | 2002 |
| | AZAL Baku | 1+ | 2015 |
| | HC Baku | 1+ | 2018 |
