= Children's rights in Azerbaijan =

Protection of children’s rights is guaranteed by the Constitution of the Republic of Azerbaijan and a number of other laws. Children’s rights embrace legal, social and other issues concerning children.

According to a report by the U.S. Bureau of International Labor Affairs, Azerbaijan has made "minimal advancement" in child labor protection and that "children in Azerbaijan are subjected to the worst forms of child labor".

== Legal status of the child ==
According to the Law on the Rights of the Child and the Family Code of Azerbaijan, when a child’s rights and interests are violated, including failure of parents in their responsibilities in a child’s education and upbringing, the child has the right to apply to a number of judicial state bodies, as well as the courts. A child can apply individually or through their representatives depending on the right that has been violated and the corresponding procedural rules thereof.

One department of the State Committee for Family, Woman and Child issues that was established at the presidential decree dated on 6 February 2006, deals with problems in this context. The Committee holds responsibility for protecting children, developing their welfare, providing their rights and freedoms as well as coordination of state policy in this sphere. It conducts regular monitoring in state-controlled institutions, investigates applications made by citizens, organizes acknowledging campaigns, training and events for experts and children, etc.

The Azerbaijani Government and this Committee cooperate with international institutions in a related-field. Furthermore, Azerbaijan closely cooperates with UNICEF in the field of education, health and other social issues such as children with disabilities, street children, and preventing violence against children, early marriages, child mortality, and preschool education.

== Convention on the Rights of the Child (CRC) ==
In 1992, the UN Convention on the “Rights of the Child” was ratified in Azerbaijan and eight years later, its two Optional Protocols were ratified, including “Involvement of children in armed conflicts” and “Sale of children, child prostitution and child pornography”.

Azerbaijan adopted the United Nations Standard Minimum Rules for the Administration of Juvenile Justice in 1993, the Convention on Consent to Marriage, Minimum Age for Marriage and Registration of Marriages in 1996, the European Social Charter in 2004, and the Convention on Elimination of Discrimination in Education Sphere in 2006.

The Government provides the UN Committee on the Rights of the Child (UNHCR) with periodic reports for the implementation of Convention and its two Optional Protocols. In addition, Azerbaijan is a side to the Universal Declaration on “Survival, protection and development of children”. A number of national legislative acts have been confirmed in the “on protection of child rights’ as well.

=== Legal status of the Convention on the Rights of the Child (CRC) ===
The CRC is incorporated into national law. In addition, Azerbaijan released the Law on the Rights of the Child harmonizing its legislation with the principles stated in the CRC in 1998. However, the Committee on the Rights of the Child empathized a number of areas of national law which are needed to be reformed in order to be in keeping with the Convention.

== UNICEF ==
UNICEF has been operating in Azerbaijan since 1993. The main aims of the program include establishing a protective environment for all children without making any discrimination. The protection of children against violence, exploitation, abuse and discrimination is a global priority for UNICEF. In Azerbaijan, the principles of the Convention on the Rights of the Child and the Convention on the Elimination of All Forms of Discrimination against Women manage the program.

UNICEF accepts survival, protection and development of children as a basis for human progress. In addition, children and families from developing countries get services from UNICEF which it uses political will and material resources to assist the developing countries to guarantee a “first call for children” and to form their capacity to develop relevant policies. Furthermore, the organization focuses on providing special protection for the most disadvantaged children- victims of war, disasters, extreme poverty, all forms of violence and exploitation and those with disabilities. Moreover, it cooperates with United Nations partners and humanitarian agencies to rapidly respond to the issues of children’s rights. In this regard, UNICEF started a project based on children in conflict with the law in 2005. The aims of project include raising awareness of policemen, judges and care/security personnel on human rights of children with the law and establishing proper referral system to help children in the contact with the law enforcement and justice environments. In terms of the project, the organization took actions below:

Action on Integration of Children with Disabilities: UNICEF aims to change attitudes towards children with disabilities in Azerbaijan through reforming home education and reviewing data collection.

Action on Street Children: UNICEF targets improvement of community-based social services for children and working in the streets by working with child protection authorities and NGOs.

Action on Mine Risk Education: In order to enlighten children about possible mine /UXO explosions, UNICEF is working with local partners to add Mine Risk Education in the school curriculum in frontline districts.

== United Aid for Azerbaijan – UAFA ==
In 1998, United Aid for Azerbaijan (UAFA) was founded aiming to ‘aid long-term development of life in Azerbaijan, with particular focus on children, health and education’. UAFA operates as a local NGO in Azerbaijan though registered in the UK. Pilot projects were introduced by UAFA in cooperation with state bodies to support children with disabilities and their families, bring pre-school services to children from low-income families and establish small teams of social workers in regions where disability, poverty and location threaten the stability of a family.

== International Day of Children’s Protection ==
Azerbaijan celebrates the International Day of Children’s Protection on June 1. Azerbaijan prioritizes a protection of children. In this regard, the actions regarding the development of living conditions, health, education and future employment of children were covered in the State Program of the Republic of Azerbaijan on Child Policy. Furthermore, a special focus was given to the organization of a range of events on children from vulnerable groups, such as children deprived of parental care, with disabilities, from national minorities, as well as refugee and IDP children.

In addition, Heydar Aliyev Foundation, founded in May 2004, implements a number of projects on the development of childcare institutions’ infrastructure, providing funding for the renovation of orphanages and boarding schools and construction of nursery schools and kindergartens. Besides, the foundation deals with the implementation of the projects directed towards the social integration of children, who have lost their parents and who are brought up in orphanages, as well as of people with disabilities. In regard with the framework of the program titled “Development of children's houses and orphanages”, the Foundation has restored and equipped 34 children’s institutions.

== See also ==
Children of Azerbaijan

Rights of Children

AZERBAIJAN: CHILDREN'S RIGHTS REFERENCES IN THE UNIVERSAL PERIODIC REVIEW

UNICEF in Azerbaijan

Labour rights in Azerbaijan
