= State Social Protection Fund (Azerbaijan) =

Azerbaijani government agency

State Social Protection Fund of Azerbaijan Republic
- Azərbaycan Respublikası Dövlət Sosial Müdafiə Fondu

Agency overview
- Formed: 30 September 1992
- Headquarters: 80 Hasan Bey Zardabi Avenue, Baku, Azerbaijan Republic AZ1122
- Agency executive: Zaka Mirzayev, Chairperson of the Board
- Website: dsmf.gov.az

State Social Protection Fund (SSPF) of Azerbaijan – is a legal person of public law operating in the field of compulsory state social insurance and voluntary (additional) social insurance, providing the population with labour pensions, social allowances, state mandatory personal insurance benefits, targeted state social assistance, Presidential stipends and compensations, as well as other benefits specified in laws of the Republic of Azerbaijan, acts of the President of the Republic of Azerbaijan and the Cabinet of Ministers of the Republic of Azerbaijan. The SSPF operates under the auspices of the Ministry of Labour and Social Protection of Population of the Republic of Azerbaijan.

== History ==
The Pension Fund of the Republic of Azerbaijan was created by Decree No. 503 of the President of the Republic of Azerbaijan dated 16 December 1991 “On the Establishment of the Pension Fund of the Republic of Azerbaijan”

The State Social Protection Fund of the Republic of Azerbaijan was created on the basis of the Pension Fund of the Republic of Azerbaijan and the Social Insurance Fund of the Republic of Azerbaijan by Decree No. 233 of the President of the Republic of Azerbaijan dated 30 September 1992 “On the Establishment of the State Social Protection Fund of the Republic of Azerbaijan”

By Decree No. 853 of the President of the Republic of Azerbaijan dated 18 March 2016, the State Social Protection Fund of the Republic of Azerbaijan was integrated into the structure of the Ministry of Labour and Social Protection of Population of the Republic of Azerbaijan and was named the State Social Protection Fund under the Ministry of Labour and Social Protection of Population of the Republic of Azerbaijan.

The State Social Security Service under the Ministry of Labour and Social Protection of Population of the Republic of Azerbaijan was merged with the State Social Protection Fund under the Ministry of Labour and Social Protection of Population of the Republic of Azerbaijan by Decree No. 976 of the President of the Republic of Azerbaijan dated 24 June 2016 “On Amendments to the Decree of the President of the Republic of Azerbaijan No. 386 dated 16 February 2011 “On the Optimization of the Structure of the Ministry of Labour and Social Protection of Population of the Republic of Azerbaijan” and “On Measures related to the Improvement of the Activities of the Ministry of Labour and Social Protection of Population of the Republic of Azerbaijan””.

Decree No. 912 of the President of the Republic of Azerbaijan dated 30 December 2019 “On Additional Measures Related to the Improvement of Management in the Field of Social Protection,” which envisages the establishment of the State Social Protection Fund under the Ministry of Labour and Social Protection of Population (hereinafter – Fund) in the form of a legal person of public law on the basis of the State Social Protection Fund under the Ministry of Labour and Social Protection of Population of the Republic of Azerbaijan, was adopted.

The “Charter of the State Social Protection Fund” was approved by Decree No. 1077 of the President of the Republic of Azerbaijan dated 30 June 2020. The Charter determined that the State Social Protection Fund is a legal person of public law operating in the field of compulsory state social insurance and voluntary (additional) social insurance, providing the population with labour pensions, social allowances, targeted state social assistance, Presidential stipends and compensations, as well as other benefits specified in laws of the Republic of Azerbaijan, acts of the President of the Republic of Azerbaijan and the Cabinet of Ministers of the Republic of Azerbaijan. The SSPF operates under the auspices of the Ministry of Labour and Social Protection of Population of the Republic of Azerbaijan.

General management and control over the activities of the Fund has been assigned to the Board.

To optimize the operations of its structural units and improve management, the Fund operates through 8 central and 19 regional branches.

== Directions of activities ==
The Fund carries out its activities in accordance with its Charter approved by Decree No. 1077 of the President of the Republic of Azerbaijan dated 30 June 2020. According to the Charter, the directions of activity of the Fund are as follows:

- To ensure the development of the field of provision of compulsory state social insurance and voluntary (additional) social insurance, labour pensions of the population, social allowances, targeted state social allowance, state mandatory personal insurance payments, Presidential stipends and compensations, as well as other payments provided for by the laws of the Republic of Azerbaijan, and the acts of the President of the Republic of Azerbaijan and the Cabinet of Ministers of the Republic of Azerbaijan (hereinafter – the relevant field);
- To make proposals to the Ministry of Labour and Social Protection of Population of the Republic of Azerbaijan regarding the formulation of state policy in the relevant field, to ensure the implementation of that policy;
- To cooperate with the relevant state bodies (institutions) in the relevant field, to participate in the elaboration and implementation of proposals;
- To take measures for the provision of the population with labour pensions, social allowances, targeted state social allowance, Presidential stipends and compensations, as well as other payments provided for by the laws of the Republic of Azerbaijan, and the acts of the President of the Republic of Azerbaijan and the Cabinet of Ministers of the Republic of Azerbaijan;
- To ensure the registration and deregistration of participants of compulsory state social insurance, the registration and deregistration of insured persons and insurants for unemployment insurance, the maintaining of personalized accounting and control over it;
- To participate in the preparation and implementation of state programs related to the social protection of the population;
- To take measures for the purpose of improving activities and increasing transparency in the relevant field, as well as raising the quality of provided services, carrying them out electronically, and to support innovative ideas and projects;
- State mandatory personal insurance payments;
- Mandatory insurance against cases of loss of occupational work capacity as a result of industrial accidents and occupational diseases;
- To operate in other directions determined in its Charter.

== Organizational structure of the Fund ==
- Apparatus (Central Office) of the Fund;
- Central branches of the Fund;
- Regional branches of the Fund.

== Board of the Fund ==
The management body of the Fund is the Board. The Board consists of 5 members – the Chairperson of the Board and his 4 deputies – appointed to and dismissed from position by the Minister of Labour and Social Protection of Population of the Republic of Azerbaijan. The Chairperson of the Board of the Fund is Zaka Mirzayev.

== Centralization ==
In accordance with the relevant Decree of the President of the Republic of Azerbaijan, the activity of the SSPF has been organized in the form of a legal person of public law. The creation of regional branches has created full conditions for the implementation of the management of several districts from one district centre. Reception departments located in other surrounding districts are subordinate to the regional branches.

== International cooperation ==
The Fund cooperates with a number of international organizations operating at the global and regional level for the purpose of studying and applying international experiences in the field of social security, as well as promoting Azerbaijan’s progressive social security system in the international arena. The Fund has been a full member of the International Association of Pension and Social Funds (hereinafter – IAPSF) since 1992, and a titular affiliate of the International Social Security Association (hereinafter – ISSA) since 2004.

The international and regional organizations with which the Fund cooperates include, along with ISSA and the IAPSF, the World Bank, the International Monetary Fund, the European Social Network, the Caspian Energy Club, the “Türkiye and Azerbaijan Businessmen and Industrialists” Public Union (TÜİB), the Israel-Azerbaijan Chamber of Commerce and Industry, the International Federation of Pension Fund Administrators (FIAP), the Asian Productivity Organization, the “GovInsider” platform, etc.

The Fund is represented in leadership positions in the management bodies of international organizations. Thus, the Chairperson of the Board of the Fund has been elected as the Chairperson of the IAPSF, as well as a member of the Bureau, which is the supreme executive body of the ISSA, and of the ISSA European Network Steering Committee. Along with this, six employees of the SSPF, having been elected as Vice-Chairpersons to six different Technical Commissions of ISSA, actively participate in the preparation of the organization's normative documents in functional areas and the determination of relevant standards. At the same time, one of the SSPF staff members is the Chairperson of the Audit Commission of the IAPSF.

International agreements between Azerbaijan and Türkiye, Russia, Georgia, Uzbekistan, Belarus, Ukraine, Serbia, Bulgaria, Moldova, Kazakhstan, and Kyrgyzstan in the field of social security are in effect. Along with this, exchange of experience and information in the field of pension-insurance is conducted with the relevant institutions of more than 50 countries, including the USA, the UK, Germany, Japan, South Korea, the UAE, Kuwait, and the countries of the European Union , and the signing of various types of documents on cooperation is carried out. Works are also being done in the direction of organizing international events in the field of social security in Azerbaijan. As a result of the reforms implemented in Azerbaijan in the field of social security, the Fund, participating in international competitions, has been awarded a total of 81 international awards in the years 2021–2025.

The Fund currently continues its activities on the basis of 5 international ISO standards that have successfully completed the certification process in the past period.

== See also ==
- Economy of Azerbaijan
