= Samir Sharifov =

Azerbaijani politician

- Samir Şərifov
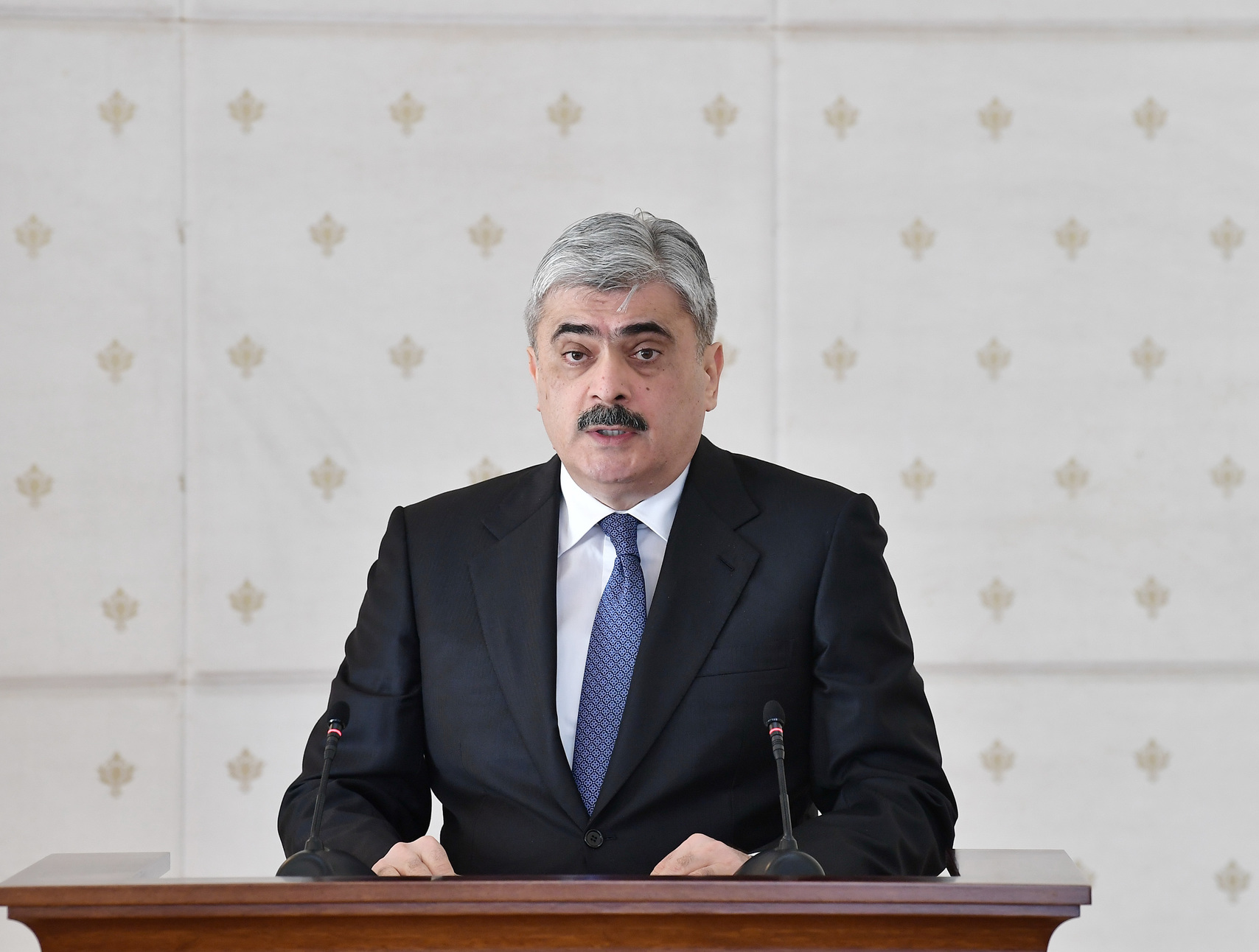
- Sharifov in 2018

Deputy Prime Minister of Azerbaijan
- Incumbent
- Assumed office 10 January 2025
- Prime Minister: Ali Asadov

Minister of Finance
- In office 18 April 2006 – 10 January 2025
- Prime Minister: Artur Rasizade; Novruz Mammadov; Ali Asadov
- Preceded by: Avaz Alakbarov

Executive Director of State Oil Fund of Azerbaijan
- In office 3 January 2001 – 18 April 2006
- Preceded by: Position established
- Succeeded by: Shahmar Movsumov

Personal details
- Born: 7 September 1961 (age 65) Baku, Azerbaijan SSR, USSR
- Party: Independent
- Education: National University of Kyiv

Samir Rauf oghlu Sharifov (Azerbaijani: Samir Rauf oğlu Şərifov; born 7 September 1961) is an Azerbaijani politician, Deputy Prime Minister of Azerbaijan (since 2025), former Minister of Finance of the Republic of Azerbaijan (2006-2025).

== Early life ==
Sharifov was born on 7 September 1961. In 1983, he graduated from Kiev State University with a Master's degree in International Economic Relations. In 1983-1991, he worked for Soviet governmental organizations dealing with international economic relations and was based first in Baku, then in Yemen.

== Political career ==
In 1991-1995, Sharifov worked as Deputy Chief of Department of International Economic Relations at the Ministry of Foreign Affairs of Azerbaijan. From 1995 through 2001, he was a department director at the Central Bank of Azerbaijan. On 3 January 2001 he was appointed Executive Director of State Oil Fund of Azerbaijan by President Heydar Aliyev. From 2003 until 2006, he also chaired the State Commission on Transparency for Exploitation of Natural Resources and Manufacturing Sector. On 18 April 2006 Sharifov was replaced by Shahmar Movsumov and was appointed Minister of Finance of Azerbaijan.

In addition to being a minister, Sharifov is a member of the supervisory board of the Oil Fund of Azerbaijan and is a co-chair at Black Sea Trade and Development Bank representing the Azerbaijani side. He also attends meeting of Election Group of IMF and World Bank every year.

Samir Sharifov was appointed Minister of Finance in composition of the Cabinet of Ministers on 21 April 2018.

On January 1, 2025, he was relieved of his duties as Minister of Finance and appointed as the Deputy Prime Minister of Azerbaijan.

Sharifov is married and has 3 children.

== See also ==
- Cabinet of Azerbaijan

Political offices
Preceded by Avaz Alakbarov	Minister of Finance; 2006–2025	Succeeded by Has not been appointed for now
