= Anar Aliyev (minister) =

Azerbaijani politician (born 1980)

- Anar Rahim oglu Aliyev
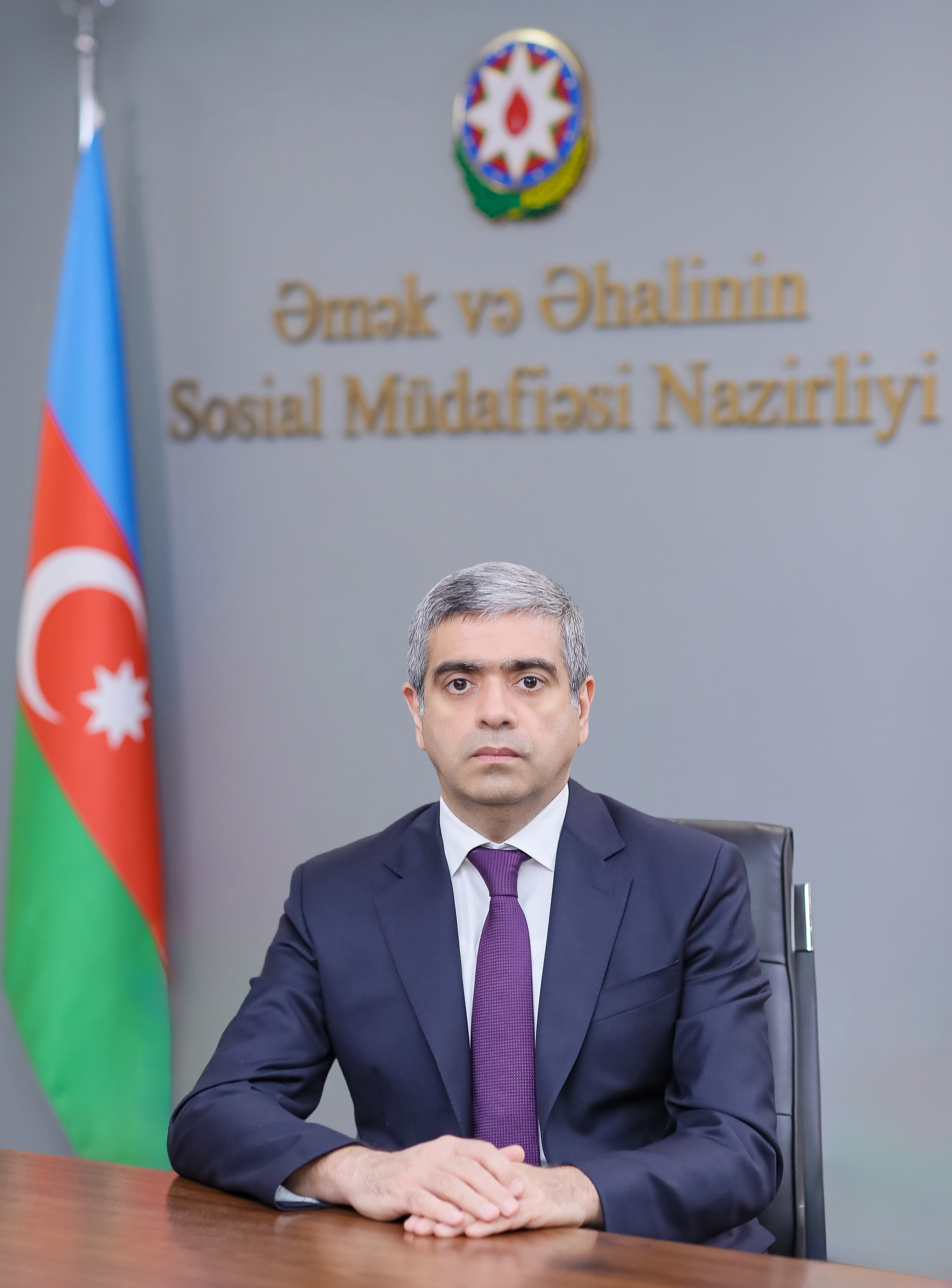

Minister of Labour and Social Protection of Population of Azerbaijan
- Incumbent
- Assumed office February 7, 2025
- President: Ilham Aliyev
- Preceded by: Sahil Babayev

Deputy Minister of Labour and Social Protection of Population of Azerbaijan
- In office October 30, 2018 – February 7, 2025
- President: Ilham Aliyev
- Minister: Sahil Babayev

Personal details
- Born: Baku, Azerbaijan SSR
- Citizenship: Azerbaijan
- Education: Baku State University
- Profession: Faculty of International Law

Anar Rahim oglu Aliyev (born 24 August 1980, Baku) is an Azerbaijani politician who has been serving as the Minister of Labour and Social Protection of Population of the Republic of Azerbaijan since 7 February 2025. From 2018 to 2025, he served as Deputy Minister of Labour and Social Protection of Population.

== Early life and education ==
Anar Aliyev was born in 1980 in Baku, Azerbaijan SSR. He graduated from the Faculty of International Law at Baku State University, earning a bachelor's degree in 2000. He subsequently completed a master's degree in 2002 and received a PhD in Law in 2006.

== Career ==
From 2000 to 2006, Mr. Aliyev worked as Secretary of Court Sessions at Local Economic Court No. 1. Between 2006 and 2008, he served as Chief Advisor in the Legal Department of the Ministry of Economy and Industry of the Republic of Azerbaijan, and from 2008 to 2018, he served as Head of the same department.

By Presidential Decree of 3 February 2016, he was appointed a member of the Appellate Board under the President of the Republic of Azerbaijan, a position he held until 2018.

In 2018, by Order of the Minister of Labour and Social Protection of Population of the Republic of Azerbaijan, he was appointed Adviser to the Minister and Chief of Staff.

By Presidential Decrees, he was appointed Deputy Minister of Labour and Social Protection of Population on 30 October 2018 and subsequently Minister of Labour and Social Protection of Population of the Republic of Azerbaijan on 7 February 2025.

== Family ==
He is married and has two children.
