= Sahil Babayev =

Azerbaijani politician (born 1980)

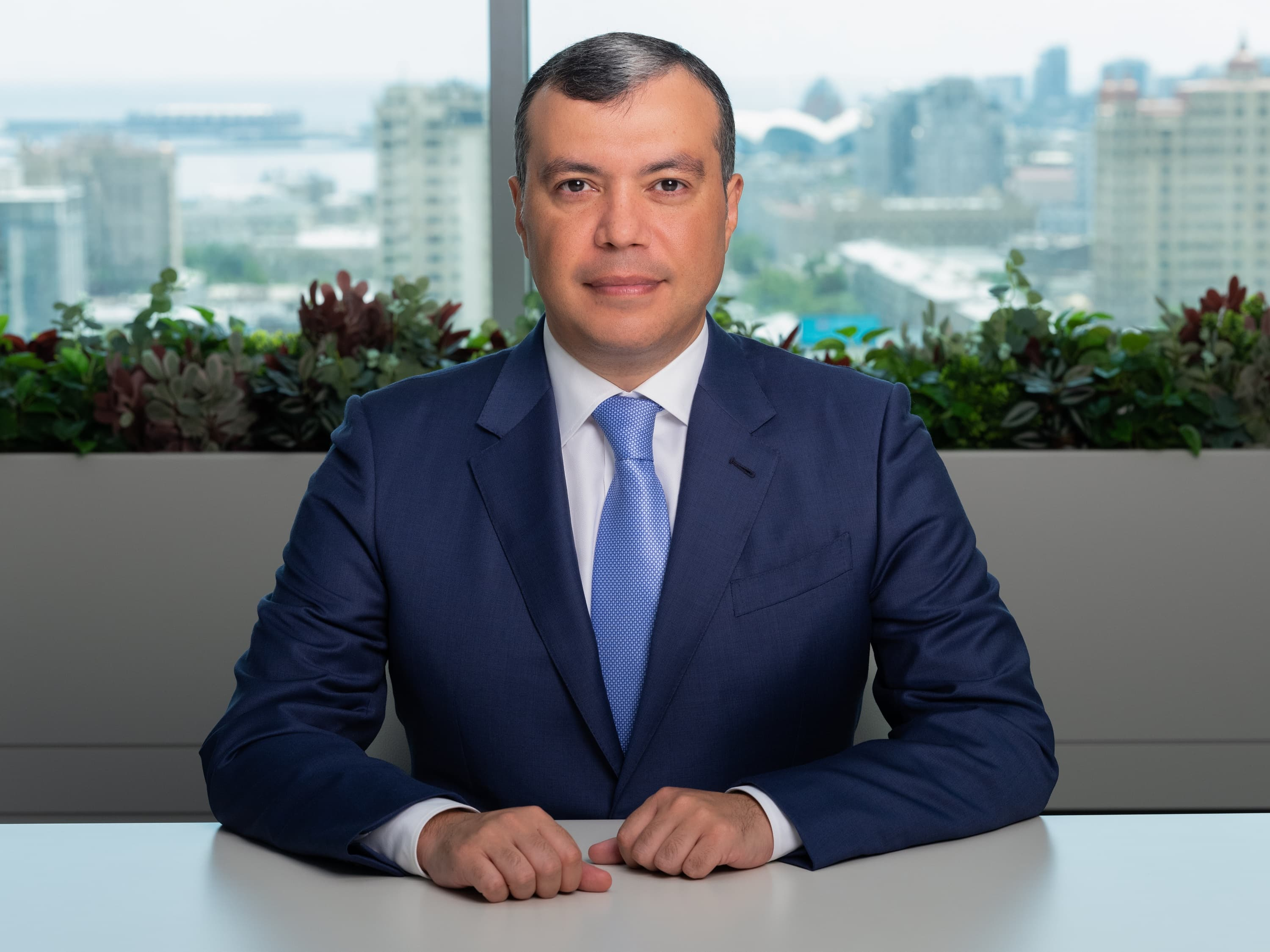

Minister of Finance
- Incumbent
- Assumed office 6 February 2025
- President: Ilham Aliyev
- Preceded by: Samir Sharifov

Minister of Labour and Social Protection of Population of the Republic of Azerbaijan
- In office 21 April 2018 – 6 February 2025

Personal details
- Born: 1980, Baku, Azerbaijan SSR
- Party: New Azerbaijan Party
- Education: Baku State University (Ph.D. in Law)

Sahil Babayev has been serving as the Minister of Finance of the Republic of Azerbaijan since February 6, 2025. Prior to this role, he served as the Minister of Labour and Social Protection of Population of the Republic of Azerbaijan from 2018 to 2025.

He also serves as the President of the National Boxing Federation of the Republic of Azerbaijan since 2022.

He co-chairs intergovernmental commissions on trade and economic cooperation between Azerbaijan and US, France, Hungary, Serbia, Romania, Montenegro and Jordan.

== Early life and education ==
Born in Baku in 1980, Sahil Babayev graduated with honours from the Faculty of International Law and International Relations of Baku State University, receiving a bachelor's degree in 2000 and a master's degree in 2002. In 2010, he obtained a PhD degree in law. He is fluent in English, Russian, and Turkish, and has a good command of French.

Sahil Babayev is a member of the New Azerbaijan Party.

== Career ==
From 1999 to 2006, Sahil Babayev worked at the State Oil Company of the Republic of Azerbaijan (SOCAR), initially as a Senior Specialist and later as head of legal departament in the Foreign Investments Division. During this period, he was involved in the preparation of Production Sharing Agreements (PSAs), Shah Deniz and Baku-Tbilisi-Ceyhan and Baku–Tbilisi–Erzurum pipeline projects.

Between 2006 and 2009, he served as Assistant to the Deputy Chairman of the Milli Majlis (Parliament) of the Republic of Azerbaijan and acted as Coordinator of the EU–Azerbaijan Parliamentary Cooperation Committee, as well as the Committee on Natural Resources, Energy, and Environment.

In 2009, he was appointed the Head of the Department for Foreign Investments and Aid Coordination at the Ministry of Economic Development and in 2011 became Head of the Department for Cooperation with International Organizations.

From 2009 to 2014, he chaired the Supervisory Board of Tamiz Shahar (Clean City) JSC, co-chaired the EU–Azerbaijan Subcommittee on Trade and Economy, headed the Program Administration Office for EU Assistance Instruments, and served as a member of the Board of Directors of SOCAR Turkey Aegean Oil Refinery (STAR project).

In March 2014, he was appointed Deputy Minister of Economy and Industry by the Decree of the President of the Republic of Azerbaijan and was reappointed Deputy Minister of Economy in January 2016.

In this capacity, he oversaw foreign economic policy, export promotion (AZPROMO), and transit coordination, represented the ministry in the Southern Gas Corridor project; chaired the supervisory board of AzerGold CJSC; and served on the supervisory board of the International Bank of Azerbaijan, as well as on the Board of Directors of the STAR project.

He also co-chaired intergovernmental commissions with Germany, the Czech Republic, Slovenia, Argentina and Brazil; served as co-chair of the Azerbaijan-Iran Working Group on financing the Resht-Astara section of the North-South Transport Corridor; and was a member of intergovernmental commissions with 19 countries.

By Decree of the President of the Republic of Azerbaijan dated 21 April 2018, he was appointed Minister of Labour and Social Protection of Population of the Republic of Azerbaijan. On 6 February 2025, he was released from this position and, at the same date, was appointed Minister of Finance of the Republic of Azerbaijan.

Mr. Babayev currently heads intergovernmental comissions with US, France, Hungary, Serbia, Romania, Montenegro and Jordan.

== Scientific activity ==
He has served as an adjunct lecturer at the Faculty of International Law at Baku State University and as a lecturer at Azerbaijan Diplomatic Academy. He has also undertaken specialised trainings and professional courses in international and contract law in the United Kingdom, France, and other countries. Mr Babayev is the author of several dissertations and monographs on international oil contracts, Production Sharing Agreements, and international legal regulation.

He also serves as Chairman of the Commercial Law State Examination Commission at the Faculty of Law of Baku State University.

== Family ==
He is married and has three children.
