= Dadash Bunyadzade =

Soviet Azerbaijani statesman (1888–1938)

- Dadaş Bünyadzadə
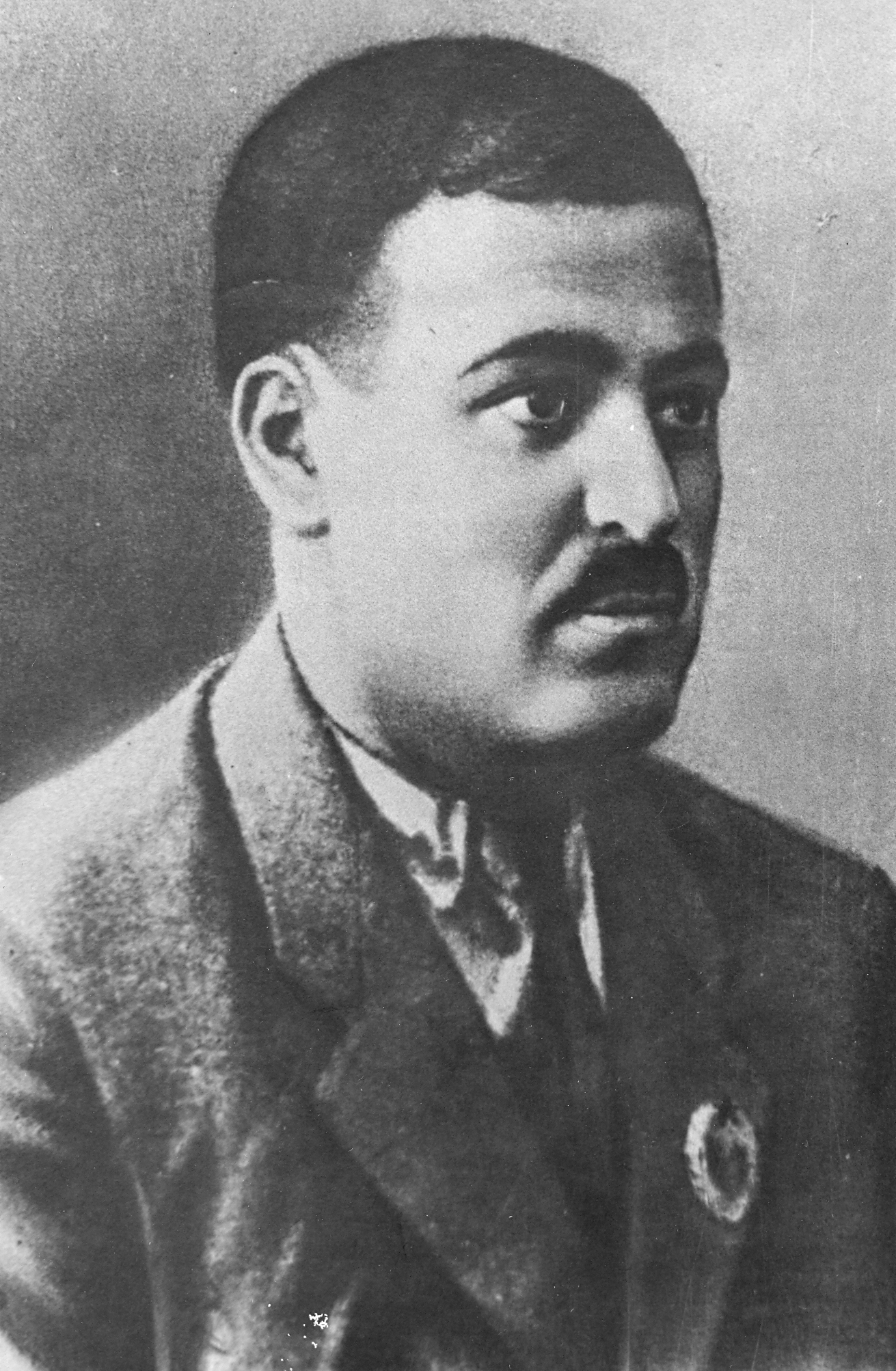
- Bunyadzade in 1930

chairman of the Council of People's Commissars of the Transcaucasian Socialist Federative Soviet Republic
- In office 1930–1932

Personal details
- Born: 1888
- Died: 1938 (aged 49–50)

Dadash Hodge oglu Bunyadzade (1888–1938) was the chairman of the Council of People's Commissars of the Transcaucasian Socialist Federative Soviet Republic from 14 March 1930 to 23 October 1932. During the Great Purge, he was arrested, accused of plotting against the Soviet state, sentenced to death and executed.

The Azerbaijan State Institute of National Economy was named after Dadash Bunyadzade.

== See also ==
- Prime Minister of Azerbaijan
