= Ministry of Labour and Social Protection of the Population (Azerbaijan) =

Azerbaijani government ministry

Ministry of Labour and Social Protection of the Population of the Republic of Azerbaijan
- Azərbaycan Respublikası Əmək və Əhalinin Sosial Müdafiəsi Nazirliyi

Agency overview
- Formed: December 26, 1918 (as Ministry of Agriculture and Labour)
- Jurisdiction: Government of Azerbaijan
- Headquarters: 85 Salatyn Asgarova Street, Baku, Azerbaijan AZ1009
- Minister responsible: Anar Aliyev, Minister of Labour and Social Protection of the Population
- Deputy Ministers responsible: Anar Aliyev; Vusal Nasirli; Anar Karimov; Hidayat Abdullayev
- Website: sosial.gov.az

The Ministry of Labour and Social Protection of the Population of the Republic of Azerbaijan (Azerbaijani: Azərbaycan Respublikası Əmək və Əhalinin Sosial Müdafiəsi Nazirliyi) is a governmental agency within the Cabinet of Azerbaijan in charge of regulating the labour markets and ensuring social protection of the population of Azerbaijan. The current minister of Labour and Social Protection of the Population, Sahil Babayev was appointed to this position based on presidential decree dated 21 April 2018.

== History ==
=== Early years ===
The 20th century is considered as a commencement of the foundation of social welfare legislation in Azerbaijan by acceptance of laws “About the responsibility of employers for industrial accidents” and “About the insurance of employees against the diseases and accidents in the workplace”. Both of these initial laws were adopted in the early years of the 1900s.

=== 1918-1920 ===
After the establishment of the Azerbaijan Democratic Republic (ADR) in 1918, the first temporary Government's Cabinet was organized and The Ministry of Agriculture and Labour was created, which was led by Akbar aga Sheykhulislam. Main directions of the government on social policy were enhancing the share of consumption fund on Gross Domestic Product (GDP), improving working conditions and increasing living standards through improvement in the provision of education, medical care, and housing standards. In that period approximately, more than three hundred acts were presented to the parliament and ten of them belonged to the social field. Two main laws were adopted about pension issues in 1918. One of them was “About establishment of the commission for preparing pension act”. During the years 1918–1920, there was Labour Exchange in Baku established on January 13, 1918, within Baku city Duma.

During the activity of the third coalition Government, the Ministry of Labour was launched in order to regulate labour relations and other relating issues in ADR in 1919. In the same year, Ministry arranged a meeting for the improvement of welfare and labour protection conditions. Within the framework of the meeting, it was decided to create a special commission, which would consist of both entrepreneurs and employees equally.

In April 1919 the fourth Government's Cabinet was assembled under the leadership of Nasib Yusifbayli. The Cabinet consisted of fourteen Ministers and Aslan bey Safikurdski was appointed the minister of Justice and Labour. Furthermore, Labour Inspectorate was established in the Ministry of Labour in order to regulate discussions regarding the labour protection and salaries on August 5, 1919. There were overall eight Labour Inspectorates in the regions.

The ADR accepted several laws and acts that contained social rebates for low-earned people during the activity years.

=== Azerbaijan SSR ===
After the establishment of Azerbaijan SSR in 1920, the Council of People's Commissars was arranged and Aliheydar Garayev was appointed a commissioner for Justice and Labour. Besides, Labour Protection Inspectorate was founded within the People's Commissariat for Labour in order to protect life, health of employees, effective use of labour force and placing workforce in accordance with their specialty. Approximately, more than a hundred commissions were created regarding the labour protection in the oil industry in 1920. There were several departments that were responsible for realizing the restoration of National Agriculture and the establishment of the village soviets in the regions.

Government House, Baku

The activity of the Commissariat of Public Welfare was restored again by the Article dated 1927 under the leadership of M.Hajiyev. Main directions of the commissariat were improving the social provision system and giving privileges to the disabled people and workforce.

=== 1992- present ===
The Ministry of Labour and Social Protection of the Population was established on December 10, 1992, by the Presidential Decree of Abulfaz Elchibey. Before the inception of the ministry, the labour market activities and social protection of the population were handled by the State Commission of the Azerbaijan Republic on Labour and Social Protection and later Ministry of Social Provision of the Azerbaijan Republic which were abolished. From 1992 to 2001, while Azerbaijan recovered from the collapse of the Soviet Union, the ministry was represented internationally by Sevil Sattarzade.

== Structure ==
Main functions of the ministry are:

- Organization and preparation of state policies in the labour market, social security, provision of pensions, demographics and migrations sector and enforcement of these policies within the laws and norms of Azerbaijani legislature
- Creation of favorable conditions for employable workforce
- Protection of rights of all employed individuals at all enterprises, firms, offices and organizations regardless of their legal governmental or non-governmental status
- Enforcement of laws ensuring decrease of unemployment, increasing capabilities and opportunities for the disabled, youth, women with many children, Azerbaijani refugees and IDPs, members of the killed during the war; organization of events in cooperation with state and private companies for new hires
- Regulation of state assistance programs to poor families, provision of social services for the disabled and individuals with no families
- Implementation of research programs on demographics, labour and social protection and enhancing international cooperation in this sphere
- Organization of rehabilitation programs for the disabled, assistance to the disabled with acquisition of prosthetic appliances
- Regulation over enforcement of laws securing workforce protection, labour relations, workplace hygiene, migration, etc.

The ministry holds various events in the regions of Azerbaijan to stimulate deconcentration of the workforce in the capital.

== Bilateral relations ==
Ministry of Labour and Social Protection of the Population Azerbaijan cooperates with more than twenty various countries such as Russia, Turkey, Germany, Sweden, Austria, Netherlands, Bulgaria, Latvia, Belarus, and Kazakhstan. According to the statistics, there are signed more than forty agreements, memorandums and protocols between the Ministry of Labour and Social Protection of the Population and the same structures of the foreign countries.

=== Turkey ===
During the official travel of Azerbaijani president Ilham Aliyev to Turkey in 2013 governmental agreements were signed between the Ministries of Labour and Social Protection of the Population. The agreement is about mutual labour activity and cooperation between the ministries of two countries. There is a Permanent Joint Commission between Turkey and Azerbaijan that realizes mutual relations in social protection field. Meeting of the ministers of Labour and Employment was organized by the presidency of Turkey in 2015. Participants of the meeting were the member states of G20 which cover the most economically developed countries. Azerbaijan also participated in the meeting. Within the framework of the meeting, Ankara declaration was signed. Declaration assembled main issues such as the creation of new workshops, achievement of the development through the decrease in inequality and investing in the improvement of abilities and realization of the whole usage of disabled people's potential opportunities.

In February 2018 Turkish delegates visited Azerbaijan under the leadership of the minister of Labour and Social Protection. During the official visit the ninth meeting of the Permanent Joint Commission was held and at the end of the meeting, the protocol was signed relating to the future improvement directions of the Ministries of Labour and Social Protection.

=== Belarus ===
Belarusian President Alexander Lukashenko visited Azerbaijan in 2013. During his official travel, the meeting was organized by the participation of delegates from two countries. After the meeting signing ceremony of the Azerbaijani-Belarusian was held and within the framework of the ceremony cooperative agreement was signed between the Minister of Labour and Social Protection of the Population of Azerbaijan and Minister of Foreign Affairs Belarus.

=== Russia ===
In September 2016 Russian delegates visited Azerbaijan under the leadership of the Deputy Chairman of Russia, Olga Golodets. During the meeting discussion was held between Azerbaijan Ministry of Labour and Social Protection of the Population and Russian delegates about the increase of experience exchange and the improvement of mutual relations in the field of Labour and Social Protection. At the same time, the seminar was organized about the implementation of the electronic technologies in Social Protection sphere for the representatives of Russian Social Insurance Fund.

=== Other countries ===
Azerbaijan Ministry of Labour and Social Protection of the Population signed bilateral cooperation agreements with the Ministry of Welfare of Latvia and the Ministry of Labour, Social Affairs, Martyrs, and Disabled of Afghanistan in 2015. Further relating agreements were signed between Tajikistan Ministry of Labour, Migration, and Employment of the Population and Ukraine Ministry of Social Policy, respectively in 2016 and in 2017.

== See also ==
- Cabinet of Azerbaijan
- Labour rights in Azerbaijan
- Labor Code of Azerbaijan
- Social Services Agency (Azerbaijan)
