= Huseyn Rahmanov =

Azerbaijani politician (1902–1938)

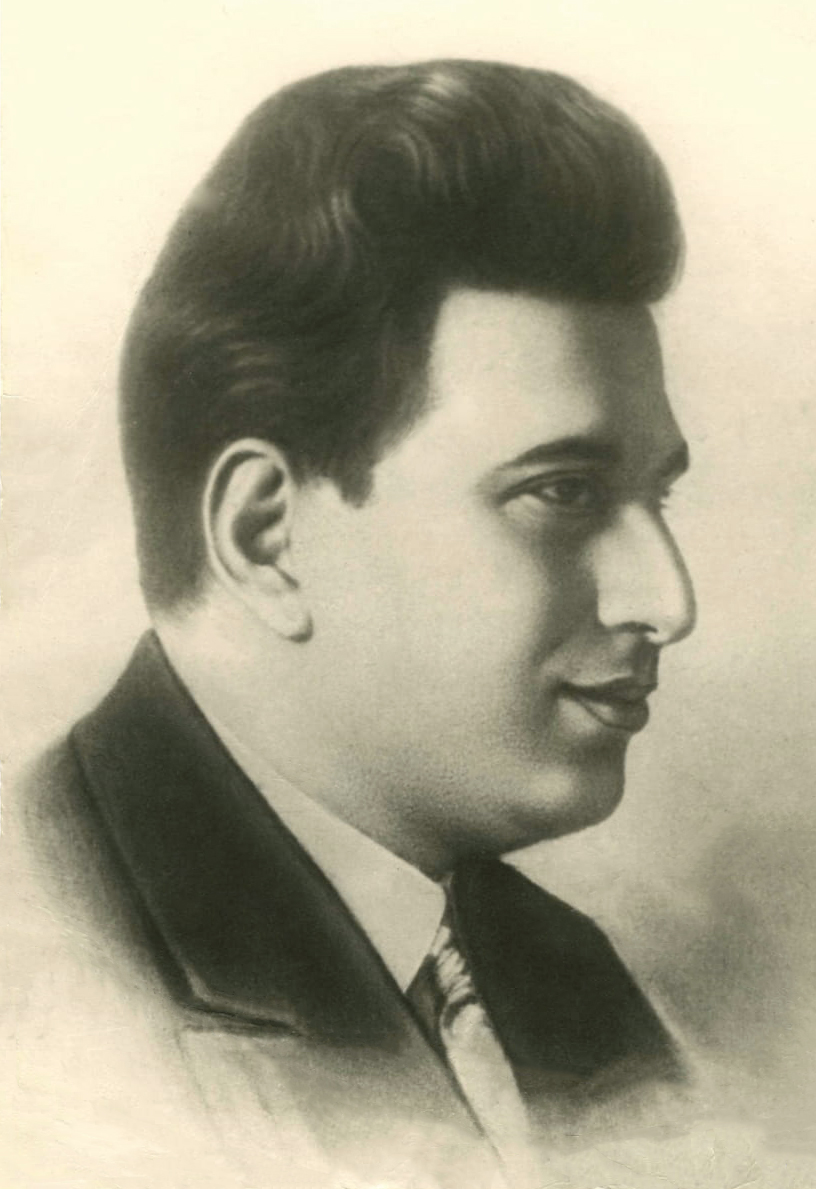
Huseyn Rahmanov

Huseyn Rahmanov (1 December 1902 in Baku – 21 April 1938) was an Azerbaijani and Soviet politician and statesman. He was the chairman of the Council of People's Commissars of the Transcaucasian Socialist Federative Soviet Republic from 12 December 1933 to 22 August 1937. He was one of those repressed in the 1930s, and during the Great Purge, he was arrested, accused of plotting against the Soviet state, sentenced to be shot dead and executed.

== See also ==
- Prime Minister of Azerbaijan
