= Ali Nazem =

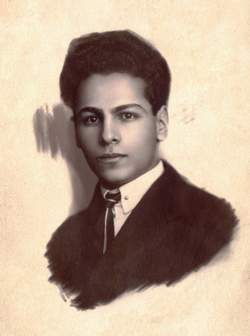
- Native name: علی ناظم
- Born: 1906; Tabriz, Iran
- Died: 1941; Baku, Azerbaijan
- Occupation: Poet, writer and literary critic

Ali Nazem (Persian: علی ناظم, Azerbaijani: Əli Nazim) – was an Azerbaijani poet, writer, and literary critic of Azerbaijani literature.

== Early life ==
Nazem was born on 24 November 1906 in Tabriz. He graduated from the Leningrad Institute of Oriental Studies and later completed his postgraduate studies in Moscow, where he conducted research and teaching.

== Writings ==
His writing was first published in 1921 in the newspaper "Ishtirak" ("Communist"). In 1930, Nazem became a member of the Communist Party and served as an active Marxist literary critic. He is now considered one of the founders of Marxist criticism in Azerbaijan, known for his work on the history of classical literature (about MFAkhundov, J. Mamedkulizade, MA Sabir, etc.)

In 1937 he was, together with A. Jawad, H. Javid, Mushfig, Musahanly, Yusif Vazir, S. Hussein, Cantemir, Talibli, and A. Razi, declared an "agent of the German-Japanese fascism, Trotskyist, Musavat and nationalist deviators." In 1937, he was arrested and died in prison on 23 August 1941. In 1957 Nazem was rehabilitated.
