= Jafar Khandan =

Azerbaijani writer and poet (1911–1961)

Jafar Khandan Cəfər Xəndan
- Born: May 8, 1910; Erivan, Erivan uezd, Erivan Governorate, Russian Empire
- Died: August 10, 1961 (aged 51); Baku, Azerbaijan SSR, USSR
- Occupation(s): writer, poet

Jafar Zeynal oghlu Hajiyev (Azerbaijani: Cəfər Zeynal oğlu Hacıyev, May 8, 1910 – August 10, 1961) was an Azerbaijani poet, critic, literary critic, member of the Union of Azerbaijani Writers since 1938, doctor of philological sciences (1948), professor (1949).

== Biography ==
Jafar Khandan was born on May 8, 1910, in Erivan. He graduated from Ganja Pedagogical Technical College. He entered the Azerbaijan State Pedagogical Institute and taught at the labor faculty (1925–1929). After graduating from the Faculty of Language and Literature of the institute, he entered postgraduate studies, and at the same time worked as an assistant and then a docent of the Department of Literature of the institute (1932–1941).

He worked as the dean of the Faculty of Language and Literature of the M.F. Akhundov Azerbaijan Teachers' Institute, head of the department of the Azerbaijan State Pedagogical Institute, head of the department at the Institute of Language and Literature of the Azerbaijan Academy of Sciences, organizational secretary of the Union of Azerbaijani Writers, responsible secretary of "Allahsiz" magazine, "Ədəbiyyat qəzeti", director of the literature department in the "Gənc işçi" editorial office.

He was mobilized in 1941 and fought against the Nazis as a political leader and journalist in the Soviet army. He was the chief instructor of the political department on the Southwestern, North Caucasian, and Transcaucasian fronts, and the deputy editor in charge of the front newspapers (1944–1946).

After his discharge from the army, he worked as an associate professor at the Department of Azerbaijani Literature of the Azerbaijan State University, and at the same time as the head of the Culture and Household Department at the newspaper "Communist" (1946–1947). He was the dean of the Faculty of Philology of the university (1947–1950), and then the rector of the Azerbaijan State University for four years (1950–1954). In 1954–1961, he worked as the head of the Soviet literature department of the university. He defended his dissertation on "The national liberation struggle of the people of South Azerbaijan in 1906–1946 and its reflection in fiction" and received a doctorate degree.

He died on August 10, 1961, in Baku.

== Awards ==
- Order of the Red Star — 1942
- Order of the Red Banner of Labour — 1946
- Medal "For the Defence of the Caucasus"
- Medal "For the Victory over Germany in the Great Patriotic War 1941–1945"
- Order of the Badge of Honour
