= Taghi Shahbazi Simurg =

Azerbaijani politician (1892–1938)

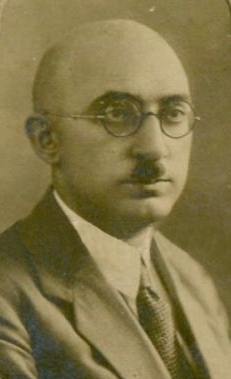
- Born: 1892; Baku, Russian Empire
- Died: 2 January 1938 (aged 45–46); Baku, Azerbaijan SSR, USSR
- Occupations: Writer, politician and revolutionary

Taghi Shahbazi Simurg (Azerbaijani: Tağı Şahbazi Simurğ; 1892, Baku, Caucasus Administration – 2 January 1938, Baku, Azerbaijan SSR) was an Azerbaijani statesman, doctor, writer and revolutionary.

== Life ==
Taghi Shahbazi was born in the village of Fatmayı in the Baku District in 1892. He received his primary education at the local "mollakhana" in his village and was later transferred to Baku's Old City school. He completed his middle education at the Rus-Tatar School, where the notable Azerbaijani Turk enlightener, Habib bey Mahmudbeyov, served as the director. After graduating from school, he successfully passed the Latin language exam at the Baku Gymnasium and subsequently gained admission to Kharkiv University. Initially, he enrolled in the Faculty of Mathematics and Physics, but he later changed his decision and transferred to the Faculty of Medicine. While in the new faculty, he became involved in revolutionary circles, particularly aligning himself with the Bolshevik faction of the Social Democrat Party of Russia. In 1917, he became a member of the Azerbaijani Turks revolutionary organization known as "Hummat." In 1919, he served as the head of the Hummat organization in Ukraine and as the head of the Information Department of the Organization of Communist Parties of Eastern Nations. He also held the position of Chairman of the Transcaucasian branch of the Nationality Commissariat of RSFSR. Following the occupation of the Azerbaijani Democratic Republic by the Red Army, he assumed various high-ranking roles within the new government. After the Bolshevik occupation of Azerbaijan, he held several positions, including Deputy Commissioner of Education from 1922 to 1923, Editor of the magazine "Education and Culture" in 1923, and Secretary of the Central Executive Committee of Azerbaijan from 1923 to 1926 and then from 1926 to 1929. Between 1930 and 1937, he served as the Rector of ASU and as the Deputy People's Commissar of Health for Azerbaijan. During the period of the Great Purge in the Soviet Union, he was arrested on charges of counter-revolutionary activity and nationalism.

In 1938, following a brief 15-minute trial, he was sentenced to death.

His works as a writer primarily revolve around the themes of the struggle against religious fanaticism and women's freedom. Some of his notable stories include "Free as Birds," "Good World," "Milk Girl," "Sugar Shepherd," "Hungry," "World of Injustice," "Haji Salman," "The Master's Maid," "Misery in the House of Mashadi Gadim," "For Freedom's Sake," "Elegance," "A Windy Evening," and others. These stories delve into these topics. One of his notable works, titled "Enemies," was completed in 1932. This work's central theme focuses on the class struggle within villages during the collectivist project of the Soviet Union.

== See also ==
- Magsud Mammadov
