= Ayyub Khanbudagov =

Azerbaijan politician

Eyyub Hanbudagov

3rd Chairman of the Extraordinary Commission of the Azerbaijan SSR

Personal details
- Born: 1893 Elisabethpol Governorate (Ganja), Russian Empire
- Died: 12 October 1937 (aged 43–44) Baku, Azerbaijan Soviet Socialist Republic
- Party: Azerbaijan Communist Party (1993)

Ayyub Shirin oglu Khanbudagov (Azerbaijani: Əyyub Şirin oğlu Xanbudaqov, 1893-1937) was Chairman of the Extraordinary Commission (Cheka) of Azerbaijan and Secretary of the Central Committee of the Azerbaijan Community Party (ACP).

Khanbudagov was born in Ganja, Azerbaijan and graduated from the Baku Maritime School. From 19 October 1920 to 19 February 1921 he was the chairman of the Azeribaijani Cheka and then was elected as the second secretary of the Central Committee of the ACP, having been recommended by Nariman Narimanov. He later worked in the Transcaucasian Socialist Federative Soviet Republic until its dissolution in 1936.

On 19 December 1936, he was arrested on charges of nationalism. On 23 July 1937, he was sentenced to five years in prison by a special session of the Supreme Court of the Soviet Union. On 12 October of the same year, the verdict was changed to a death sentence. Khanbudagov's charge was later acquitted by the Supreme Court in December 1957.

In April 1924, Khanbudagov had published an article titled "On the National Question" in the newspaper Communist noting the continued discrimination of hiring practices against Azerbaijani workers. The accusations of nationalism by Khanbudagov, the editor of Communist Aliheydar Garayev, and Narimanov, were investigated by the 8th Baku Party Conference.
