= First All-Union Turkological Congress =

1926 conference of Turkologists and politicians in Baku

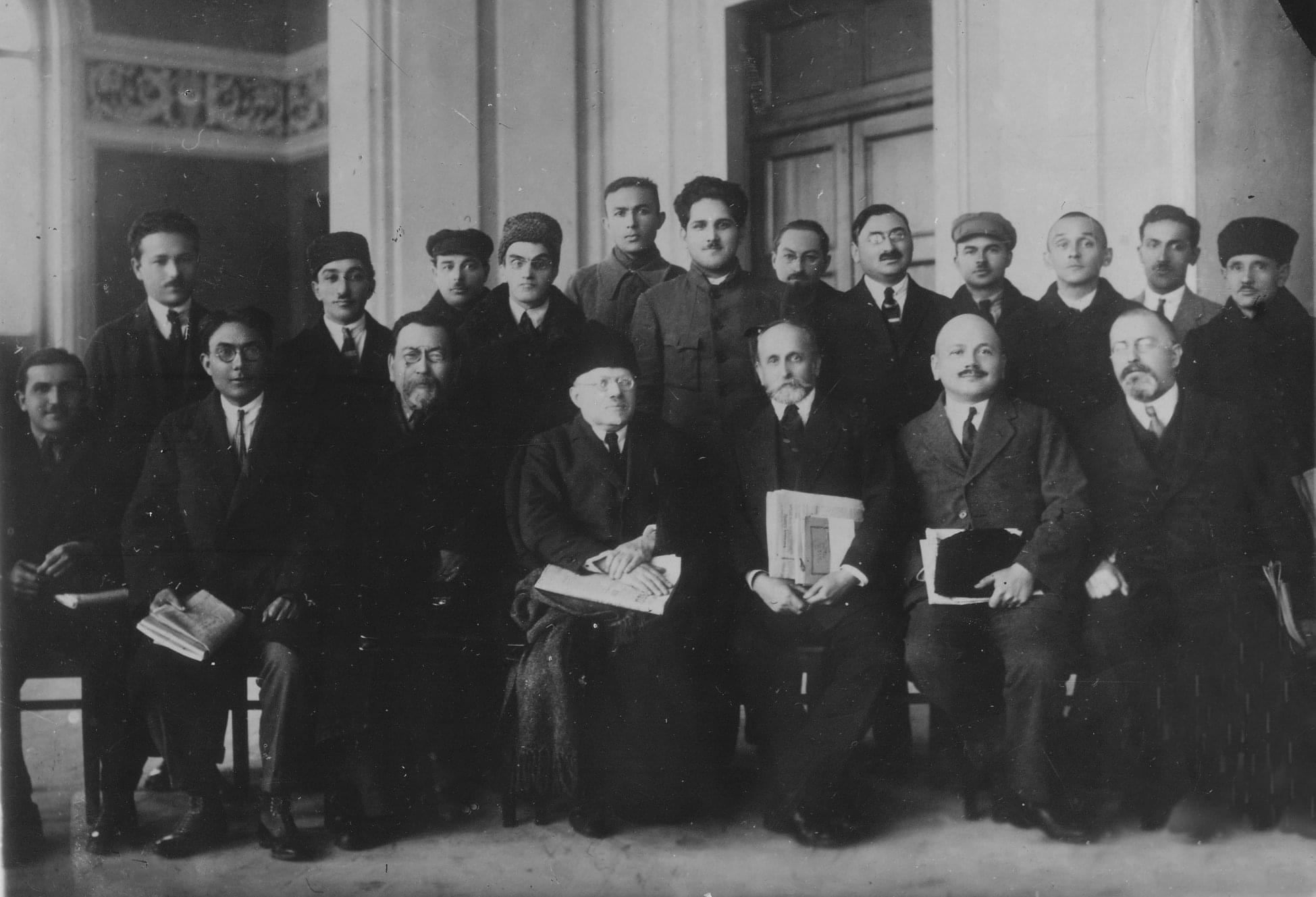
- Participants of the First All-Union Turkological Congress

General information
- Type: Academic conference (Turkology)

Organization
- First occurrence: 1926

Locations and dates
- Palace of Turkic Culture: 26 February–5 March 1926

The First All-Union Turkological Congress (Note: Azerbaijani: Биринҹи Түрколожи Гурултај, romanized: Birinci Türkoloji Qurultay; Russian: Первый Всесоюзный тюркологический съезд, romanized: Pervyj Vsesojuznyj tjurkologičeskij s’jezd) ("Congress") was a conference of Turkologists and politicians held in Baku, Azerbaijan, then part of the Soviet Union, from 26 February to 6 March 1926. The Congress focused on the history, literature, language, alphabet, ethnography, and culture of the Turkic peoples residing across the Soviet territory. It resulted in several important decisions, including establishing the scientific and methodological principles to govern the transition of Turkic-language writing to the Latin script, as well as addressing key policy questions for Turkic peoples in the Soviet Union, including alphabet standardization, orthography, terminology, and literary language development .

The Congress is regarded as a landmark event in the cultural and linguistic history of Turkic peoples in the 20th century. With a total of 131 participants including scholars, linguists, historians, poets, writers, and other prominent intellectuals, it brought together not only Turkic peoples residing in the Soviet Union but also foreign guests. The congress sessions were chaired by Samad aga Agamalioglu, the head of the Central Executive Committee of the Azerbaijan Soviet Socialist Republic (SSR).

Over 100 of the participants were later accused of Pan-Turkism and faced repression, with a majority imprisoned or killed. The significant outcome of the Congress – the transition of Turkic peoples to the Latin script – was abolished in 1939, and a mass switch to the Cyrillic alphabet was implemented for the Turkic peoples residing in the Soviet Union.

== History ==
=== Background ===
After Azerbaijan was annexed by Russia, the issue of alphabet reform in the Near East was initially raised by the prominent Azerbaijani intellectual and educator Mirza Fatali Akhundov, although his efforts did not yield results at the time. In subsequent periods, Ismail Gasprinsky, Uzeyir Hajibeyov, Jalil Mammadguluzadeh, Mammad agha Shahtakhtinski, Firidun bey Kocharli, Veli Khuluflu, and Huseyn Javid also engaged in activities regarding alphabet reform, and the Azerbaijan Democratic Republic also considered it. However, the Republic's 23-month life did not allow for fully addressing this crucial issue.

After Azerbaijan was Sovietized, the issue of alphabet reform became even more relevant. As early as 1922, under the chairmanship of Nariman Narimanov, a "Transition to the Latin Alphabet" committee was established in Baku. This process received special attention not only from Baku scholars but also from Turkologists working in other scientific centers of the Soviet Union at that time. By 1922 the newspaper Yeni Yol, under the leadership of Jalil Mammadguluzadeh, had already been published using the Latin alphabet, and in the same year the "New Turkic Alphabet" committee was created with Samed aga Agamalioglu leading it. And then, on 20 October 1923, the Azerbaijani government issued a decision to adopt the New Turkic Alphabet as the state alphabet, although both the Latin script and the Arabic script were still in use.

=== Approval and preparation ===
In August 1925, the All-Russian Central Executive Committee of the Soviet Union approved the holding of an All-Union Turkology Congress. The idea of convening the Congress had been submitted to the Soviet leadership by the Azerbaijan SSR government a year earlier. Six months later the necessity of resolving issues related to the transition to the Latin alphabet had been raised during the 1st Azerbaijani Local Oriental Studies Congress and at the sessions of the Soviet Academy of Sciences and the Union of Orientalists of the Soviet Union.

With the Congress approved, the Soviet of People's Commissars of the USSR established an organizing commission to prepare the convening of the Congress. This commission included Samad aga Aghamalioglu (chairman), M. Pavlovich, Habib Jabiyev, Vasily Bartold, Aleksandr Martynov, Djelal ed-Din Korkmasov, G. Broydo, Tyuryakulov, Zifeld, Fitred, Bekir Çoban-zade, Ashmarin, Odabash, Novshirvano, Ahmet Baitursynuly, and Yusufzade. The organizing commission published the Xəbərlər ("News") to publicise the work done in preparation for the Congress.

=== Attendees ===
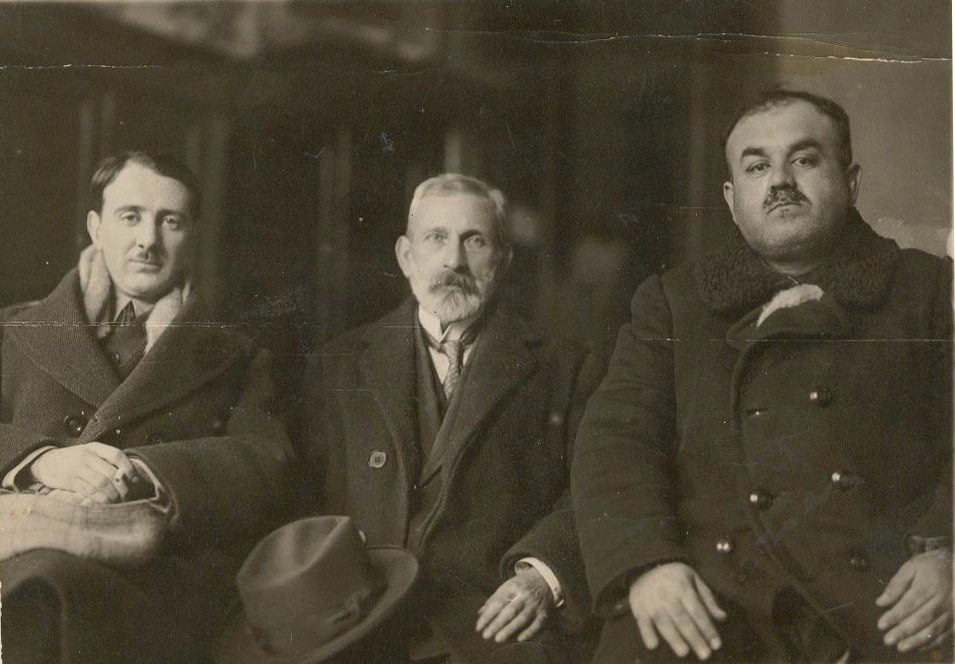
Mehmet Fuat Köprülü, Ali bey Huseynzade and Salman Mümtaz among the participants of the First Turkological Congress in Baku.

On 26 February 1926 the First All-Union Turkological Congress commenced at the Ismailiyya Palace in Baku. There were 131 delegates, including 20 representatives from the international scientific community. During a total of 17 sessions, 38 presentations were delivered on the language, history, ethnogenesis, ethnography, literature, and culture of Turks and the broader Turkic world.

Samad aga Agamalioglu, the Chairman of the Central Executive Committee of the Azerbaijan SSR, presided over the Congress, and the following individuals were elected to the Congress's Presidium: Agamalioglu; Ruhulla Akhundov; Habib Jabiyev; the renowned orientalist-historian academician Vasily Bartold; academician Sergey Oldenburg; the representative of European scholars Professor F. F. Mensel; Naqovitsin from the People's Commissariat of Education of the Russian SFSR; Professor Çoban-zade; Professor Aleksandr Martynov; Baitursynuly from Kazakhstan; Isidor Barahov from Yakutia; Borozdin and Pavloviç from the Oriental Studies Association; Ğälimcan İbrahimov from Tatarstan; İdelquzin from Bashkortostan; Mehmet Fuat Koprulu from Turkey; Korkmasov; Shakircan Rahim from Uzbekistan; Tunstanov from Karakalpakstan; Berdiyev from Turkmenistan; Osman Nuri Akchokraklı from Crimea; and Aliyev Umar from the North Caucasus. Additionally, representatives from Azerbaijan and other republics such as Ali bey Huseynzade, Banq, Mustafa Guliyev, Academician Nikolai Marr, Anatoly Lunacharsky, and Tomsen were chosen as honorary members of the Congress's Presidium.

Gazanfar Musabeyov, the Chairman of the Central Executive Committee of the USSR, delivered a congratulatory speech welcoming the participants, and the Congress also featured events in honour of the renowned Turkologists Wilhelm Radloff and Ismail Bey Gasprinski. The participation of distinguished Turkologists and orientalists such as Bartold, Kopruluzade, A.Huseynzade, Krımski, Poppe, and Ashmarin highlighted the Conference's importance and prestige.

== Notable presentations ==
Numerous scholarly presentations were delivered during the course of the Congress. Notable presentations included: Bartold's "The Contemporary State of the History and Study Tasks of Turkic Peoples"; Oldenburg's "Methods of Ethnographic Studies Among Turkic Peoples"; A. A. Müller's "On the Art of Descriptive Representations among Turkic Peoples"; F. Kopruluzade's "The Development of Literary Languages among Turkic Peoples"; Martynov's "The Contemporary State and Future Tasks of Studying Turkic Languages"; Chobanzade's "On the Close Kinship of Turkic Dialects"; Hanafi Zeynalli's "On the Scientific Terminology System in Turkic Languages"; S. Y. Malov's "The Contemporary State and Perspectives of Studying Ancient Turkic Languages"; Farhad Aghazade's "Orthography in Turkic Languages"; N. F. Yakovlev's "Problems of Establishing an Alphabet System Related to the Social and Cultural Conditions of Turkic Nations"; C. Memmedzade's "On the Alphabet Systems of Turkic Peoples"; Kemanov's "Fundamentals of the Methodology of Teaching Turkic Languages"; N. N. Poppe's "The Historical and Contemporary State of the Issue of Mutual Kinship of Turkic Languages with Altaic Languages"; H. Şərəf's "Issues of Applying Arabic and Latin Script Systems for Turkic-Tatar Peoples"; and T. Mensel's "Results and Perspectives of Studying Balkan Turkic Literature". The theoretical perspective of the phonetics scholar Lev Shcherba's presentation on "The Basic Principles of Orthography and Their Social Significance" was also particularly noteworthy.

The presentation by Armenian linguist R. Y. Acharyan on the topic of "Mutual Influence of Turkic and Armenian Languages" addressed the influence of the Turkic language on the Armenian language throughout history at all linguistic levels. The main focus of his presentation was the transition from Old Armenian ("Grabar") to New Armenian ("Ashgarabar"), and the idea that the linguistic stimulus for this transition is Turkish.

G. İbrahimov, the head of the six-member delegation from Tatarstan, expressed his opposition to transitioning to a new alphabet based on the Arabic script. Despite his objections, he put forward the idea that "there should be no conflict on this issue" and presented a paper on the matter during the Congress. In his presentation, İbrahimov addressed the issue of orthography and provided proposals with regard to it. The first part of his three-part presentation focused on the critical analysis of old orthographies existing until the second half of the 19th century, as well as the analysis of Uyghur, Orkhon, and old Arabic scripts. The second part described the reforms of the Arabic alphabet, and the third part outlined the movements toward the reform of the orthography of Turkic peoples. In general, İbrahimov identified the specific features of Turkic languages that should be considered for the accurate development of Turkic orthography, but there was no indication of opposition to Latinization in his speeches and proposals.

In his speech at the Congress, the Tatar literary figure Aziz Gubaydullin reported that Salman Mümtaz was publishing the works of Azerbaijani poets in the Kommunist newspaper. Gubaydullin expressed his appreciation for the biographical information written by Salman Mumtaz about the poets, considering it the "most valuable biographical information" and highlighting its significance before each publication. Over the course of the Congress, Mumtaz presented his new book Nasimi as a gift to the participants, and representatives of the Congress also participated in the 500th anniversary celebration of the prominent Uzbek poet Ali-Shir Nava'i.

== Decisions made ==
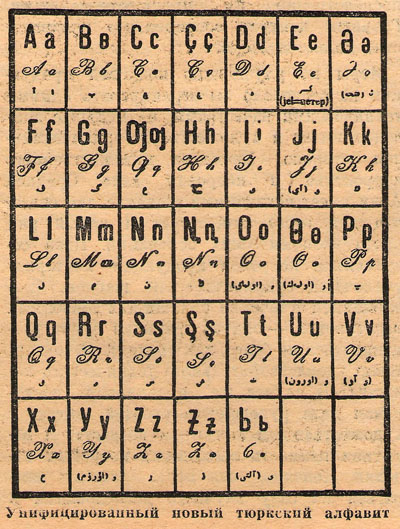
The first common Turkish alphabet with adapted Latin script

The following seven areas with major issues related to Turkic languages were discussed at the Congress:

1. Alphabet
2. Spelling/orthography
3. Terminology
4. Teaching/methodology
5. Mutual relationship and interference problems of related and neighbouring languages
6. Literary language problems of Turkic languages, including the issue of a common literary language
7. Grand language theory and historical problems of Turkic languages

Drawing on a number of principles, decisions were made in each of these areas, including: with regard to spelling/orthography, despite the preference given to the phonemic principle, morphological and historical-traditional principle issues were also taken into account; with regard to terminology, preference was given to the Turkish language's own internal capabilities and specific international words as the main source; with regard to teaching/methodology, in addition to the European standards in the teaching of the mother tongue the importance of the national tradition was also noted; and with regard to the study of related and neighbouring languages by scientific methods, the importance of the perspectives of Altaic studies and comparativistics was highlighted.

The norms and stylistic features of Turkic literary languages, as well as the issue of the ancestral homeland of Turkic peoples, were also discussed and presented back to the Congress by the co-chairman of the organizing committee, Djelal ed-Din Korkmasov. Among the decisions made by the Congress, those regarding a common alphabet, a common literary language, and common terminology held a particularly significant place.

== Outcomes ==
=== Widespread adoption of Latin-script alphabet ===
As a result of the Congress's decisions, from 1929 to 1939 all Turkic republics within the Soviet Union would use the Latin script rather than the Arabic alphabet. In some Turkic republics this transition occurred earlier. For example, on 3 July 1927 the party organization of the Tatarstan Republic officially announced the transition to the "New Alphabet" (Tatar: Jaŋalif). In other republics the Congress decisions played a vital role. For example, despite the 1923 adoption of the New Turkish alphabet as the state alphabet of Azerbaijan, it was only after the Congress that the official transition to a unified Latin-script alphabet took place. Before that, the Arabic script was still widely used throughout the republic's territory. Based on the decisions of the Congress, the Soviet government officially banned the use of the Arabic alphabet on 1 January 1929, and a large-scale book burning campaign was conducted with the aim of eradicating the Arabic script from memory. Five years after Azerbaijan SSR switched to the Latin script, the Republic of Turkey also adopted this alphabet.

=== Backlash ===
In the late 1930s the leadership of the Soviet Union initiated efforts to replace the Latin script. A decision was made in 1939 to use the Cyrillic alphabet in all the national republics of the Soviet Union because, according to the official explanation, the transition from the Latin alphabet to the Cyrillic script was "covered by the general desire of the workers."

At the same time many participants in the Congress were accused of pan-Turkism, nationalism, and counter-revolutionary activities, leading to over 100 of them facing various forms of repression. Some were killed, including Ruhulla Akhundov, Martynov, Korkmasov, Çoban-zade, Aqçoqraqlı, Baitursynuly, Salman Mumtaz, Isidor Barahov, Hanafi Zeynalli, and Hikmet Jevdet-zade, amongst others.

So although the Congress had decided that a Second Turkology Congress would take place in 1927 in the city of Samarkand, these subsequent events prevented this happening.

== Remembrance and celebration ==
Immediately after the Congress, a documentary film entitled First Turkology Congress was produced in Azerbaijan and released in 1926. It featured Samad Agamalioglu, Gafar Musabekov, Ali bey Huseynzade, and Huseyn Javid, and highlighted the proceedings of the Congress, the adoption of the new Latin alphabet by Turkic peoples, and the unanimous decisions made by the Congress on issues related to the literature and language of Turkic peoples. It was the first time the First All-Union Turkology Congress was discussed worldwide, but it wouldn't be until the last quarter of the 20th century that the Congress received further official recognition: in 1976, the Second Republic Conference of young philologists on the theme "Current Problems of Turkmen Philology", held at the Magtymguly Institute of Language and Literature of the Academy of Sciences of Turkmenistan, was dedicated to the 50th anniversary of the First All-Union Turkology Congress.

Then on 5 November 2005, after the re-establishment of Azerbaijan's independence from the Soviet Union, the Congress gained national significance in Azerbaijan for the second time when the Azerbaijani President Ilham Aliyev signed a decree ordering the celebration of its 80th anniversary. This significant and now-recognised historical event was subsequently commemorated by an international conference held in Baku in 2006.

On 18 February 2016, Azerbaijani President Ilham Aliyev signed another decree to ensure the state-level commemoration of the 90th anniversary of the Congress. This decree highlighted how the restoration of Azerbaijani independence had firmly established the official status of the Azerbaijani language as the state language, creating a favorable ground under modern conditions for the successful implementation of decisions and recommendations previously put forward by the Congress. The decree emphasized the Congress's role in the formulation of new concepts in Turkology research, the recognition of Azerbaijan as one of the influential centers of Turkological research on a global scale, and the creation of a theoretical and scientific framework for the cultural and spiritual unity of Turkic peoples. These achievements inspired respect for the memory of the distinguished Turkologists who had become innocent victims of repression shortly after the Congress, and highlighted the success of the organizational work of the Congress.

Following the decree, a plan of events for the commemoration of the 90th Jubilee at the Azerbaijan National Academy of Sciences was prepared. A joint meeting of the Humanities and Social Sciences Divisions of the Academy was held on 3 March 2016 under the chairmanship of the First Vice President of the Azerbaijan National Academy of Sciences, Academician Isa Habibbayli. During the meeting, discussions were held on planned activities and instructions were given to the relevant institutes and organizations regarding the proper celebration of the 90th anniversary of the Congress. On 14 and 15 November 2016, an international conference dedicated to the 90th anniversary of the First All-Union Turkology Congress was held in Baku. Prior to this, various events commemorating the 90th anniversary were held in the institutes and organizations of the Azerbaijan National Academy of Sciences, Baku State University, the Azerbaijan Independence Museum, and in Turkey.

== See also ==
- Pan-Turkism
