= Salman Mumtaz =

Azerbaijani scholar and poet

Salman Mumutaz
- Salman Mümtaz
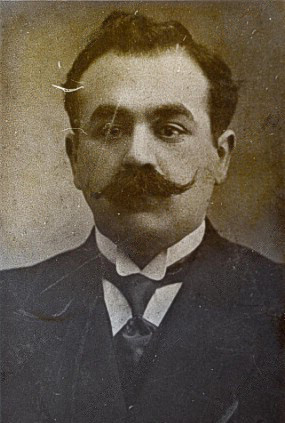
- Salman Mumtaz in 1917
- Born: May 20, 1884; Nukha
- Died: September 6, 1941 (aged 57); Oryol
- Cause of death: shot in prison
- Citizenship: USSR
- Education: Mullah school in Ashkhabad
- Known for: collecting, publishing and promoting the classical Azerbaijani literary legacy, and discovering unknown manuscripts of a number of Azerbaijani poets and ashugs
- Spouse: Zeynab Mumtaz
- Children: Isgandar Mumtaz, Shahla Mumtazzade
- Scientific career
- Institutions: Azerbaijan Filial of Academy of Sciences of USSR

Salman Mumtaz (Azerbaijani: Salman Məmmədəmin oğlu Əsgərov; May 20, 1884, Nukha – September 6, 1941, Oryol) — Azerbaijani poet, literature historian, bibliographer, and collector of medieval manuscripts. He was a member of the Union of Azerbaijani writers since 1934, a researcher in the 1st category of the literature sector of the Azerbaijani Branch of the Academy of Sciences of the Soviet Union, and the director of the Azerbaijani Literature Department of the Azerbaijani National Institute of Scientific Research from 1929 to 1932.

Salman Mumtaz (pseudonymous of Salman Mammedamin oghlu Asgarov; May 20, 1884 – September 6, 1941) was a renowned Azerbaijani literary scholar and poet. He was born in Shaki in 1884. In his efforts to collect, publish and promote the classical literary legacy, he discovered unknown manuscripts of a number of Azerbaijani poets and ashugs. Falling a victim to repressions, he was arrested in 1937 and killed by shooting in 1941 while imprisoned in Oryol.

Mumtaz studied in Ashgabat. Since 1910, he began speaking against religious fanaticism and superstition with his poems and feuilletons in the Molla Nasreddin and other magazines. In addition to his native Azerbaijani, he was fluent in Persian, Arabic, Russian, Turkish and Urdu languages. Mumtaz prepared the works of Imadaddin Nasimi, Qovsi Tabrizi, Molla Panah Vagif, Gasim Bey Zakir, Mirza Shafi Vazeh and other Azerbaijani classic poets for publication. In 1927-1928, he published two volumes of Azerbaijani ashik poetry. He also compiled scientific texts of Khatai, Fuzuli, and others.

In October 1937, Mumtaz became a victim of the Great Purge when he was arrested and sentenced to ten years of imprisonment. He was shot in September 1941 in the city of Oryol while in prison. The 270 manuscripts collected by him were destroyed during his arrest. On November 17, 1956, he was posthumously exonerated by the USSR Supreme Court.

== His life ==
=== Early years ===
Salman Mammadamin oghlu Asgerov was born on May 20, 1884, in the Ganjali neighborhood of Nukha (now Shaki, the city of Azerbaijan). Salman’s dad, Mammadamin was a merchant and his family lived in Central Asia for a long time. Salman’s grandfather Aghaalasgar was very rich. Shortly after his death, his wife also died, and his house was burned down. His orphaned son Mammadamin takes refuge with his uncle, who has acquired their wealth, and works for jeweler. He visits Mashhad. On his way back, he made his way through Ashgabat, because he heard that lands were being sold here for a very cheap price. Mashhadi Mammadamin buys a lot of land from Ashgabat with the gold he brought from Shaki, he builds a home for himself. In a short time, he had a caravanserai and became store owner. Mammadamin, who was preparing to bring his family living in Sheki to the new property he built in Ashgabat, died of pneumonia in 1887 at the age of 32. In 1900, Mammadamin's wife Mashhadi Zahra Khanum (1865-1938) took her younger brother Karbalai Askar from Baku and went to Ashgabat and acquire Mammadamin’s wealth. She also brings her sons Salman and Askhar to Ashgabat. Then she takes her older brother Karbalayı Movsum with her. Zahra Khanum who is related to Mirza Fatali Akhundzada, was a thoughtful and capable woman. She buys a big box and fills it with gold until her sons grow up (Salman Mumtaz later spent those golds to buy Azerbaijani handwritten books and charity work).

Since childhood, Salman Mumtaz was very interested in science; he knew Persian and Arabic languages perfectly. He studied in Ashgabat, where he also learned Persian and Arabic languages. Here, he learned Persian and Arabic as well as Urdu from a teacher named Mirza Asadulla. In 1893, 9-year-old Salman met with Mirza Alakbar Sabir in Ashgabat. Because of this meeting, Mumtaz develops a passion for literature. Having studied with mullah for 3 months, Salman worked hard day and night until the age of 22, mastered Persian, Arabic, Russian, and Urdu languages, and mastered the essentials of Eastern literature by heart. Because of Salman's strong intellect, he had memorized many poems. Knowing the languages of the Islamic peoples made him interested in Eastern literature.

Salman, who is engaged in trade at the loom of his uncle Karbalai Movsum, begins to collect Turkish (Azerbaijani) manuscripts.

=== Partnership with Molla Nasraddin journal ===
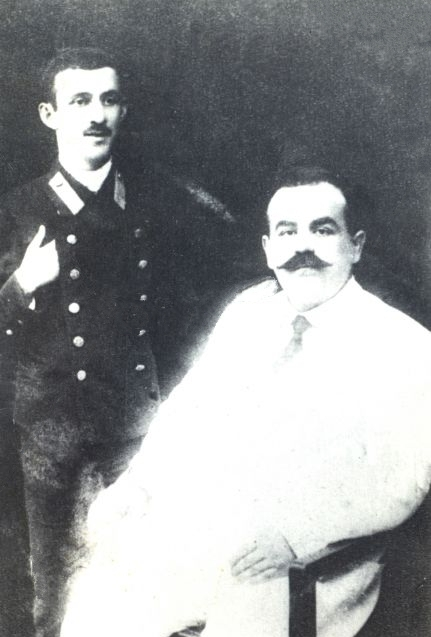
Mir Fattah Musavi, who graduated from Ashgabat gymnasium, and Salman Mumtaz, who taught him. The day he graduated from gymnasium, Ashgabat

According to the Turkish literary critic Yavuz Akpınar, in 1908-1909, after the publication of "Molla Nasreddin Magazine" in Tbilisi, Salman Mumtaz was also among the writers of this satirical magazine. At the same time, he also wrote poems in classical style. Together with his friends, he founded a literary meeting in Ashgabat. In 1908-1909, Mumtaz attracted the attention of readers with his satirical poems and articles, which were later published in "Molla Nasreddin Magazine", as well as in other organs of the Azerbaijani press. According to Yavuz Akpınar, "In his classic works, Mumtaz expressed his love for his country and nation to the reader, and showed and exposed the shortcomings of public life.

According to the statements of Azerbaijani literary critic and historian Adalet Tahirzade, 1906 brought about a turning point in his thoughts: Mumtaz, who came to Ashgabat, corresponded with the collection of "Molla Nasreddin" and sent him a lot of news and sometimes poems. "Mozalan Bey's Travelogue", written together with Abdurrahim Bey Hagverdiyev and Gurbanali Sharifzadeh and published in "Molla Nasreddin" magazine in 1908, is considered one of his creative successes. In 1910, the second two-week meeting with Mirza Alakbar Sabir connected him even more to literature: after Sabir's encouragement, Mumtaz’s signature "Khortdan Bey" began to appear in "Molla Nasreddin" magazine.

In 1913, in Tbilisi, Salman Əsgərzadə published his first book, "Seyid Ahmad Hatif Isfahani’s interpreter and biography," at the "Geyrat" printing house of Mirza Jalil Mammadguluzade. After staying in Tbilisi for three months, Salman Əsgərzadə met Abbas Sahhat, who was deeply knowledgeable in literature, history, and art. He played an important role in the publication of Mirza Alakbar Sabir’s "Hop-hopname," which had been published two years earlier. In Tbilisi, Salman befriended Mirza Jalil and financially supported the "Molla Nasraddin" magazine. In 1913, the "Iqbal" newspaper wrote about Salman Mümtaz, one of the 11 modern poets of the time in the Caucasus: "Salman Asgarov, or by his pen name Mumtaz, shows the nation's flaws with his 12 satirical poems in the 'Molla Nasraddin' magazine, serving to guide them toward salvation with his pen." In 1916, Salman Mümtaz worked hard in Ashgabat to stage Jalil Mammadguluzadeh's "Oluler,"(The dead) but the local authorities did not allow it.

Salman Mumtaz spoke against religious bigotry and superstitions with his poems and feuilletons that he wrote in the "Molla Nasreddin" magazine, which was published in Ashgabat until 1918. Mumtaz also assisted in the distribution of "Molla Nasreddin" magazine in Central Asia and other regions.

=== Return to Azerbaijan ===
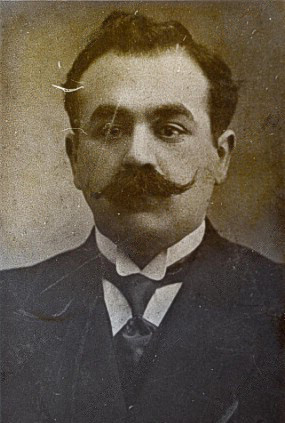
Salman Mumtaz in 1917

Salman Mumtaz returned to Baku with his family in 1918 and started working as a journalist in "Azerbaijan" newspaper. In this period, because of the national liberation struggle of the Azerbaijani people against Tsarist Russia, an independent state in Northern Azerbaijan and the first parliamentary republic of the Muslim East, the Azerbaijan Democratic Republic, was created during the First World War.

When Salman Mumtaz moved to Baku, he lived for a while in the 3rd building on Krasnokrestovsky (now Sheikh Shamil Street), on the property of his wife's brother Agarza. He opened his own shop in building 6/23 on Baryatinsky (formerly Fioletov, now - Abdulkarim Alizade Street). Salman Mumtaz, a member of the "Green Pen" society since 1919, spent a lot of money on the successful functioning of the society.

Realizing that the independence of Azerbaijan is a national treasure, Salman Mumtaz highly appreciated Nuru Pasha, the general of the Ottoman army, the commander of the Caucasian Islamic Army, and Enver Pasha, the military minister of the Ottoman Empire and a political figure. In 1918, Salman Mumtaz met Nuru Pasha and recited the ghazal ‘Öyün millət!’ that dedicated to him. Mumtaz dedicated "Enveriyye" mukhammas to Enver Pasha.

Azerbaijani actor and director Rza Tahmasib recalled Huseyn Javid's literary meetings in the Tabriz hotel and noted:

Salman Mumtaz recited poems in Persian and Azerbaijani languages by heart and with a pleasant melody. He had a very good memory.

Salman Mumtaz preferred more research. Asgarov focused all his energies on collecting, researching, identifying, publishing and disseminating Azerbaijani literature.

In 1924, Salman Asgarzade was the representative of the regional agency of "Azerneft supply" department with warehouses in Nukha, Gutgashen, Zaqatala, Gakh and Lagodekhi. He also worked in the Public Education Commissariat.

=== Academic activity ===
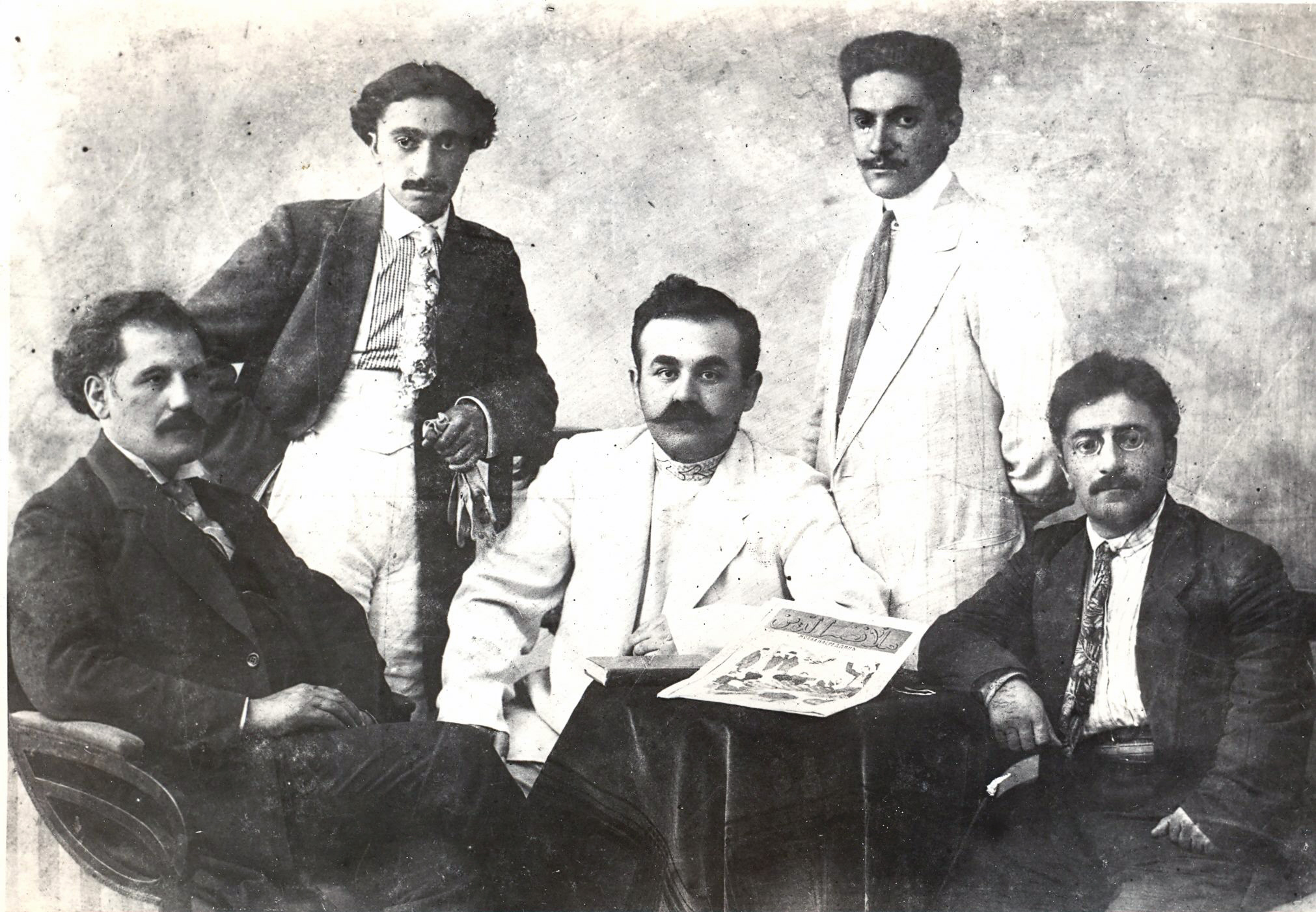
From left to right: Abdurrahim bey Hagverdiyev, Rzagulu Najafov, Salman Mumtaz, Zeynal Mammadov, and Aligulu Gamkusar Tbilisi, 1913

After the establishment of Soviet power in Azerbaijan, he was active in the field of collecting, publishing and researching the classical literary heritage, and discovered several unknown manuscripts of works by Azerbaijani poets and ashiks. From 1920 to 1925, Mumtaz managed to collect about 200 books, articles and manuscripts of various writers from representatives of Azerbaijani literature and art. He published articles on Azerbaijani literature under the title "Forgotten leaves" in "Communist" newspaper. In 1920, Salman Mumtaz was the organizer and chairman of the commission for restoration of Azerbaijani literature. Mumtaz also published 15 works on the history of Azerbaijani literature and 2 works on folk literature, three volumes of Muhammad Fuzuli's works, "250 poets" collection, "Khatai" divan, "Sayed Ahmed Hatif", "Ali Bakuvi", "Sheki Savlari" etc. is the author of works.

In 1925-1926 Salman Mumtaz published 24 poets from the Azerbaijani literature series - Imadaddin Nasimi, Qovsi Tabrizi, Nishat Shirvani, Aga Masih Shirvani, Molla Panah Vagif, Gasim Bey Zakir, Mirza Shafi Vazeh and other’s books in the publishing house of "Communist" newspaper. Many of these were the first collective editions of the poets' works.

He published the book "El şairləri" (1-2 volumes in 1927-1928; reprinted in 1935) and the stales of Sarı Ashik (1927, 1934) containing samples of Ashik poetry.

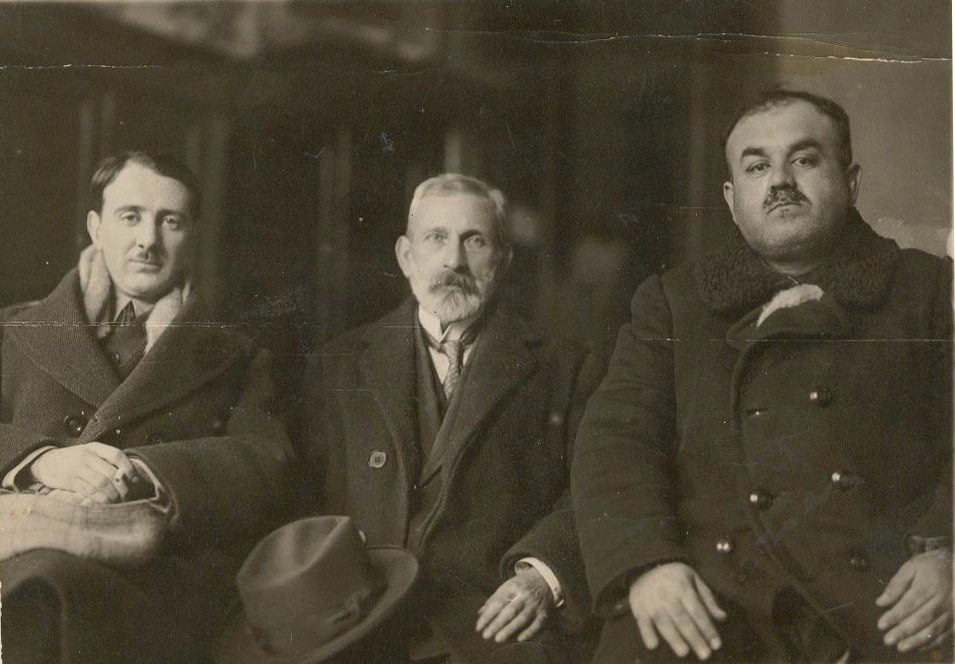
In 1926, Mehmed Fuad Köprülüzadeh, Ali bey Huseynzadeh and Salman Mumtaz Baku at the First Turkological Congress.

Salman Mumtaz participated in the 1st Turkology Congress held in Baku in 1926. Here, Mumtaz introduced his new book "Nasimi" and presented it as a gift. Salman Askerzadeh met here with the academician, professor Mehmet Fuat Köprülüzadeh, whose work he is closely acquainted with, and the founder of "Füyüzat" magazine, Professor Ali bey Huseynzadeh. (In 1950, Mehmet Fuat Köprülüzade came from Turkey to the USSR as the Minister of Foreign Affairs of Turkey. He again applied to meet Salman Mumtaz and get information about him officially. However, his request remained unanswered. Because Salman Mumtaz was a victim of repression had been and was no longer alive). Tatar writer Aziz Gubaidullin was among those who participated in the congress. Speaking at the congress, Aziz Gubaydullin stated that Salman Mumtaz had published the works of Azerbaijani poets in the "Communist" newspaper, and before each publication, the biographical information written by Salman Mumtaz about the poets was "the most valuable biographical information", and he appreciated his efforts. Also, in 1926, academicians Vasily Bartold and Sergey Oldenburg, who looked at Mumtaz's personal library ("Library-Mumtaziya"), were impressed by the library's scientific structure, numerous layouts, and the wealth of manuscripts there.

Salman Mumtaz's activity and creativity were inspired to some extent by the decrees of the leadership of the Azerbaijan SSR in the fields of literature and art in 1925-1932. During this period, Mumtaz wrote various works and published new books. Professor, scientific researcher and Doctor of Philosophy in Philology A. M. Nabiyev talked about Mumtaz's works "Sarı Ashik" and "El şairləri " written during this period of his creativity in his book "Idioms and Emotions of our People".

From 1929 to 1932, Salman Mumtaz worked as the head of the pre-capitalist Azerbaijani literature section of the Azerbaijan State Scientific Research Institute.

Since 1932, he was a researcher at the Azerbaijan State Museum. At the same time, Salman Mumtaz headed the classical heritage department of "Azernashr" publishing house from 1933 to 1936. From February 1933, Mumtaz worked as a researcher at the literary heritage department of the Azerbaijan Branch of the EA of the USSR. From April 1937, he headed the literature department of the Azerbaijan branch. Also, Mumtaz was a first-class employee of the literature department of the Institute of Language and Literature of the Azerbaijani branch of the Academy of Sciences of the USSR.

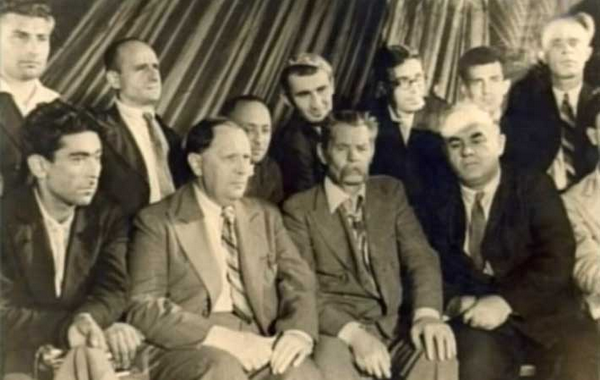
Salman Mümtaz 1934-cü ildə Moskvada SSRİ yazıçılarının birinci qurultayında. Onun sağ tərəfində əyləşir: Maxim Gorky, Aleksey Tolstoy və Samad Vurgun; arxasında dayananlar: Mehdi Huseynzade və Jafar Jabbarly.

In 1934, Salman Mumtaz participated in the First Congress of Soviet Writers held in the House of the Unions, Moscow. Mammad Kazim Alakbarli, who attended the conference, made a speech and noted in his report that Salman Mumtaz played a major role in examining the legacy of poet Mirza Shafi Vazeh and his incomparable services for Azerbaijani literature. Salman Mumtaz was also a close friend of Maxim Gorky. He met the great writer at the first congress of Writers of the USSR. Maxim Gorky took several photos with Azerbaijani writers. In the photos, Salman Mumtaz is sitting next to Maxim Gorky. According to the information received, Gorky bought a house in Moscow for Salman Mumtaz. In that year, Salman Mumtaz was invaluable in the delegation sent from Azerbaijan to Moscow to participate in the 1000th anniversary of Ferdowsi.

Salman Mumtaz's studies on literary and historical subjects were available. He was also interested in these studies and loved toponymics. Mumtaz traveled a lot and learned the geographical names of cities and villages during his travels. Mumtaz traveled simply with a backpack and his own shoes.

Salman Mumtaz also worked on the compilation of scientific and critical works of classics of Azerbaijani literature. He mastered the biographies and works of Imadaddin Nasimi, Shah Ismail Khatai, Habibi, Muhammad Fuzuli, Molla Vali Vidadi, Molla Panah Vagif, Ismail Bey Gutgashinli and others, as well as the memories of Mirza Alakbar Sabir and Abbas Sahhat. Salman Mumtaz was a close friend of the famous poet and critic Mirza Alakbar Sabir. Another field of study and interest of Salman Mumtaz was to write about the life of Mirza Alakbar and read the works of Sabir.

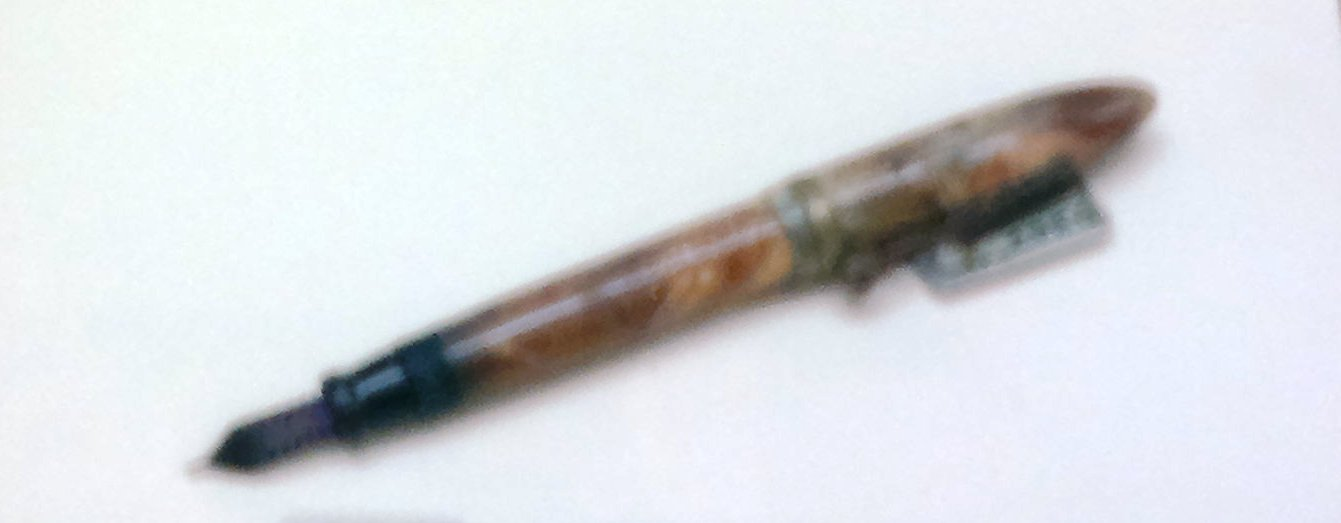
A pen belonging to Salman Mumtaz. Museum of History of Azerbaijan, Baku.

Salman Mumtaz, in addition to "Molla Nasreddin" magazine, "Azerbaijan" and "Communist" newspapers, "Zanbur", "Haji Leylak", "Tutu", "Sheypur", "Fuqara Fuyuzati", "Qurtuluş", "Brotherly Help", " Maarif and Culture", "Gizil Sharq", "Eastern Woman" magazines, as well as "Sada", "Gunesh", "Revolution", "Achyg soz", "Communist", "Taraqi", "Yeni Iqbal", "Iqbal" ", collaborated with "Adabiyyat Gazetesi" newspapers. In these newspapers and magazines, Salman Mumtaz "Ashgabatli", "Vasvası", "Eshshekarısı", "Momin Chinovnik", "Mumtaz" (translated from Arabic, this word means "chosen", "chosen from others"), "Sagsagan", "Sparrow" ", "Sarchagulu", "S.M.", "S. Asgarov", "Turkmendost", "Khortdangulu bey", "Khortdanbeyzade", "Chalagan" and other signatures, wrote satirical and lyrical poems, articles and feuilletons, prose works. These works of Mumtaz have not been collected until now. In addition to his native Azerbaijani, Salman Mumtaz has mastered Arabic, Persian, Turkish, Urdu and Russian.

Salman Mumtaz, who received spiritual strength from personalities like Mirza Alakbar Sabir and Mirza Jalil Mammadguluzade, created his artistic creativity in communication with friends such as Abdurrahim Bey Hagverdiyev, Huseyn Javid, Huseyn Sadiq (Seyid Huseyn), Abdulla Shaig, Jafar Jabbarli, Mikayil Mushfiq. His closeness with Leo Tolstoy, Maxim Gorky, Rabindranath Tagore, Sadreddin Aini and other masters of words also left certain traces in his outlook.

=== Repression and death ===
In March 1937, the Stalinist repressions, which reached their peak, did not spare Salman Mumtaz. The reasons cited included the "ideological mistakes" made alongside Hüseyn Javid, Seyid Hüseyn, and Atababa Musakhanli in the Bakinski Rabochi newspaper. On June 10, 1937, Salman Mumtaz was expelled from the Azerbaijan Writers' Union. Between June 10–12, 1937, Salman Mumtaz was labeled as an "enemy of the people." On June 19, Salman Mumtaz was dismissed from his positions for being a bourgeois nationalist and holding a Pan-Turkist stance.

The personal records of Salman Mumtaz, preserved in the Central Archive of the Azerbaijan Academy of Sciences, include a directive issued by the head of AzFAN’s Institute of Language and Literature, A. Ahmadov, dated June 19, 1937, No. 26. The directive states:

Salman Mumtaz Asgarov was dismissed from his position as a junior researcher in the literature department. From June 20, 1937, he was subjected to accusations of being a bourgeois nationalist.

Nevertheless, Mumtaz continued to collect and study rare manuscripts and books. Over many years, he gathered valuable manuscripts into his personal library, "Kitabxaneyi-Mumtaziyyə." He spent most of his time in this library.

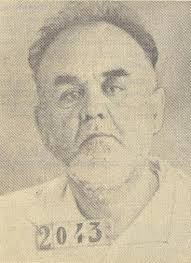
Salman Mumtaz's photo taken in prison

On October 8, 1937, at 11 p.m., Salman Mumtaz was arrested at his home on Buynaksky Street No. 25 in Baku (now Sheikh Shamil Street) as a political prisoner. A week later, Mumtaz was charged under Articles 69, 70, 72, and 73 of the Criminal Code of the Azerbaijan SSR. Salman Mumtaz endured three months of severe torture inflicted by Sinman, Galstyan, Avanesyan, and Borshchev.

During the first interrogation on October 10, 1937, Lieutenant Galstyan of the State Security Department informed Mumtaz:

"I wish to inform you that the reasons for your arrest indicate that you held a counter-revolutionary nationalist position against the Communist Party of the Soviet Union and the Soviet government and that you are a member of a counter-revolutionary nationalist organization. Do you, Salman Mumtaz Mammadamin oglu, admit to being a member of a counter-revolutionary nationalist organization and holding a counter-revolutionary nationalist position?"

Mumtaz replied: "No. I am not a member of a counter-revolutionary nationalist organization, nor do I hold a counter-revolutionary nationalist position."

Following this response, Galstyan warned Mumtaz regarding the matter:

"You will face accusations of being a member of a counter-revolutionary nationalist organization and holding a counter-revolutionary nationalist position."

Before this, Salman Mumtaz was placed under police surveillance by AzFAN's deputy director Ruhulla Akhundov and later subjected to investigation on April 4, 1937. During the investigation, he "admitted" to being a member of a counter-revolutionary bourgeois nationalist organization within the republic and the Azerbaijan SSR Academy of Sciences. Additionally, Akhundov confessed to "recruiting" individuals such as Mumtaz, Bekir Chobanzade, Yusif Vazirov, Seyid Huseyn, Uzeyir Hajibeyov, Sanili, Samad Vurgun, Mikayil Mushfig, Ahmed Javad, Huseyn Javid, Amin Abid, Muznib, Sultan Majid, Velikhanov, Safikurdsky, Ashurbeyov, and Musakhanov into the organization. During confrontations with Ruhulla Akhundov, Alekber Mammadkazimov, Chobanzade, and Qubaydullin on October 10, 1937, Salman Mumtaz categorically denied the statements made against him. He firmly stated that he had not joined any organization in 1925 or 1926 and did not hold a counter-revolutionary nationalist position.

In addition to these accusations, Salman Mumtaz was charged for working on the epic Koroglu, which was characterized as "Azerbaijan's nationalist epic." The primary reason for this accusation was the claim that by choosing this work, Mumtaz was inspiring the people to fight for national independence against the USSR. Furthermore, he was also accused for his involvement in preparing the publication of Mahmud Kashgari's Divan.

On December 7, 1937, Qalstyan completed the investigation of Salman Mumtaz's case. On December 8, 1937, Captain Avanesyan presented the indictment against Mumtaz. The indictment stated: "Salman Mammadamin oglu Asgarov is a member of the Azerbaijani counter-revolutionary bourgeois organization. He is an active member of the counter-revolutionary Pan-Turkist Center, established in 1936 at the Academy of Sciences, which sought to separate the Azerbaijani Soviet Republic from the USSR. He carried out active counter-revolutionary activities at the Academy." Salman Mumtaz rejected all these accusations as baseless and untrue. On January 8, 1938, the protocols were prepared by the USSR Supreme Court Military Collegium in preparation for the hearing of Mumtaz's case №12493/278. On January 9, 1938, a closed trial was held by the Military Collegium of the USSR Supreme Court. Although charged, Mumtaz declared his innocence. Thirty minutes after the trial began, the Military Collegium announced its verdict on Mumtaz's case. According to the ruling, Salman Mammadamin oglu Asgarov was sentenced to 10 years of imprisonment, deprived of all political rights for five years, and all his property was confiscated.

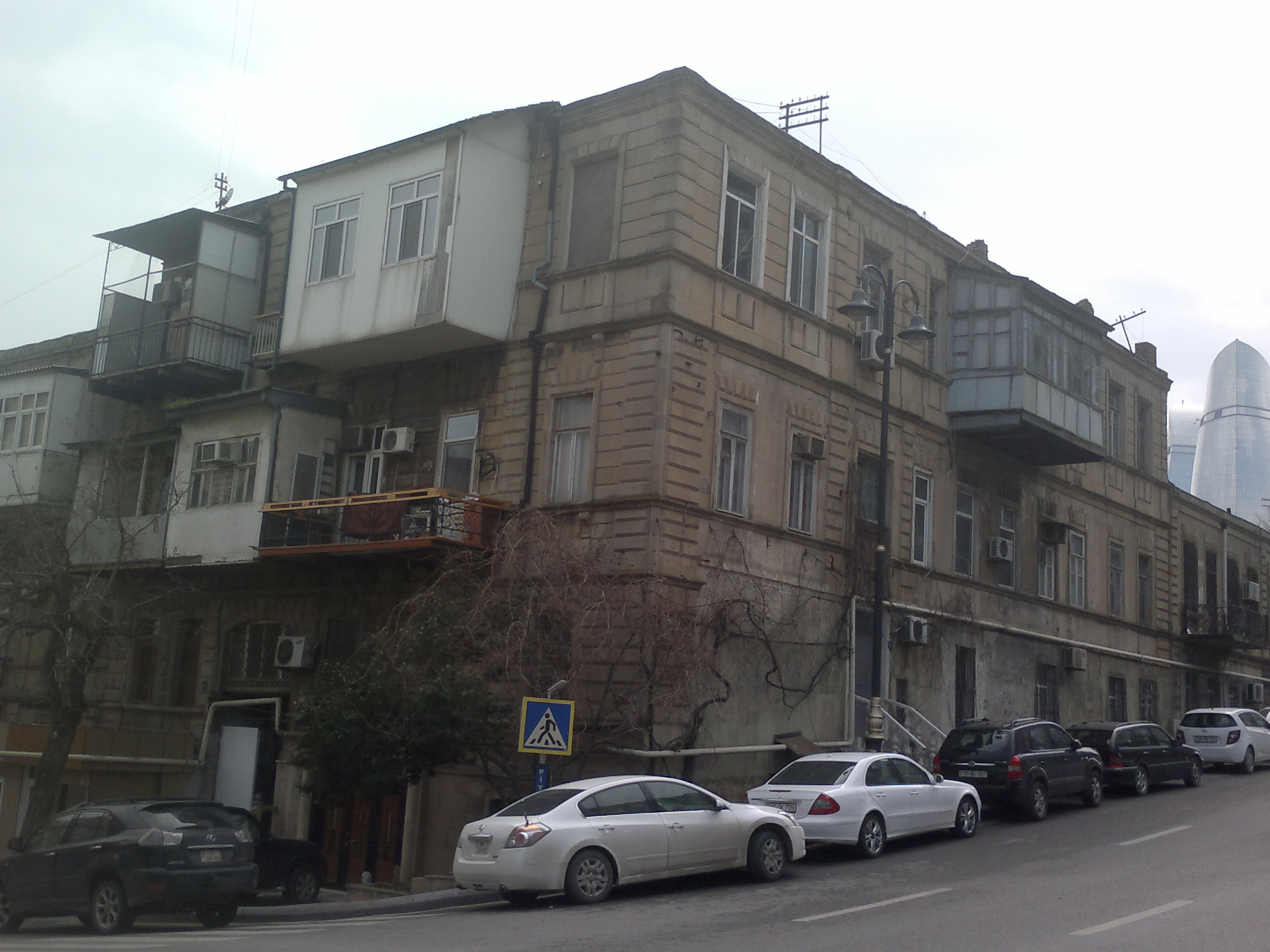
Before his arrest, Salman Mumtaz's address was Buynaksky Street No. 25 (now Sheikh Shamil Street).

After Mumtaz was deprived of his freedom, all the manuscripts he had collected were burned. During the search of his house and the confiscation of Salman Mumtaz's property, 238 manuscripts related to various fields of medieval science and written in Eastern languages were seized from his apartment. Some of these unique scholarly works, which Mumtaz could not publish, were appropriated by others and later published under different names. For the 238 manuscripts seized from Mumtaz's residence, his daughter, Shahla Khanum, was compensated with 6,010 rubles and 60 kopecks. Some authors note that after Mumtaz was arrested, 270 manuscripts he had collected were destroyed.

According to some sources, it is noted that Salman Mumtaz fell ill and died due to this illness. However, some authors state that Salman Mumtaz died on December 21, 1941, in the Sol-Iletsk prison. The death certificate presented to Mumtaz's family stated that Salman Asgarov died from a brain hemorrhage in the city of Oryol.

Mumtaz’s death occurred as follows: Salman Mumtaz was transferred to the Sol-Iletsk prison on February 24, 1938, and later to Oryol city to serve his sentence. At that time, along with other prominent scientists who were victims of repression, Mumtaz was exiled to Oryol. In June 1941, the Great Patriotic War began. Later, based on a joint decision by Lavrenti Beria and Joseph Stalin, all political prisoners in the city were to be shot before the Germans could take over. The prisoners were made to dig their own graves, and after being shot, they were buried in these graves. In Russian sources, this execution date is noted as September 6, 1941.

Mumtaz was only exonerated after the death of Joseph Stalin and the rise of Nikita Khrushchev to power. On November 16, 1956, the USSR Supreme Court annulled the charges against him. On November 17, 1956, Salman Mumtaz was exonerated. However, his family only received the news of Mumtaz's death on March 4, 1957.

== Family ==
Salman Mümtaz had married a woman named Zeynəb, who was from his hometown of Şəki. From this marriage, Mümtaz had a son named İsgəndər and a daughter named Şəhla.

Mümtaz's son İsgəndər was studying at the Academy of Fine Arts in Moscow, and his daughter Şəhla was studying at the Faculty of Chemistry at Baku State University. When Salman Mümtaz was repressed, İsgəndər was expelled from the 5th year of the academy, and Şəhla was expelled from the 2nd year of the university.

Shahla's son, Urxun Qalabəyli, the grandson of Salman Mümtaz, took up a position in Oriental Studies. Qalabəyli worked hard to promote the legacy of Salman Mümtaz. Mümtaz's daughter Şəhla also did a lot of work to protect her father's rights and even appealed to Nikita Khrushchev. As a result of these efforts, it was not possible to completely erase Salman Mumtaz from memory.

== Research in the Field of Literature ==
=== Study of the Life and Works of Azerbaijani Classical Writers ===
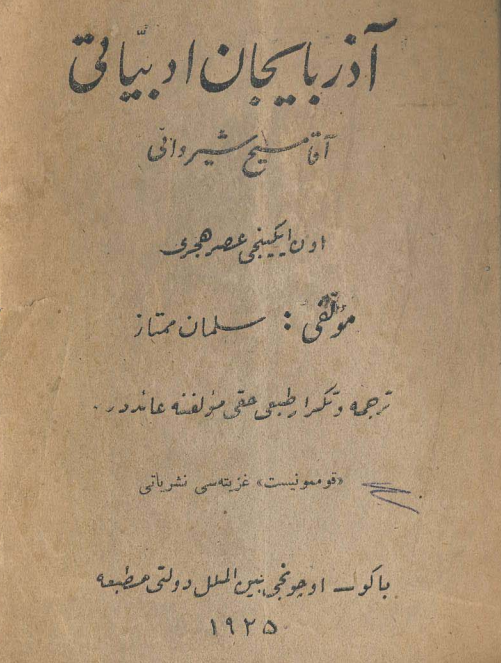
The first page of a book written by Salman Mumtaz, dedicated to the work of Agha Masih Shirvani (The book was published in 1925).

For the first time in history, Salman Mümtaz had published 16 books titled Azerbaijani Literature, focusing on the works of Azerbaijani classical authors. The first of these 16 books was published in 1925 and was dedicated to the works of Agha Mesih Shirvani. Salman Mümtaz referred to writers such as Hasanoghlu, Kadi Burhan al-Din, Shah Ismail Khatai, and Fuzuli as "the five-pointed star of our educational heavens." He highly valued the works of these poets written in their native languages, researched their legacy with great affection, and discovered many unknown works of these writers. Mümtaz also spoke for the first time about poets like Habibi, Ənvəroğlu, and İsmayıl bəy Qutqaşınlı, among many others, in the history of literature. Additionally, he was the first to identify the authors of many works and prepared the manuscripts of numerous poems for publication. Salman Mümtaz's books on Govsi Tabrizi (1925), Gasim bey Zakir (1925, 1936), Molla Panah Vagif (1925, 1937), Nasimi (1926), Mirza Shafi Vazeh (1926), Vidadi (1936), and others were the first collections published on these poets.

Salman Mumtaz Agha noted in the preface to a book dedicated to the work of Masih Shirvani:

There is no doubt that many aspects of the lines I have drafted will not satisfy my esteemed readers. They should see this flaw not in me, but in our fate. In other nations, authors wishing to write even a small piece on any subject have thousands of sources, newspapers, and journals at their disposal. However, I craft these scribbles, for better or worse, out of nothing. My sources are scraps left over from bookworms and moths, torn pages, scattered manuscripts, and white sheets found in tatters from mice and insects. My references and sources are dilapidated gravestones and collapsed mosque arches. The newspapers and journals I use are the memories and patience of old men and elderly women. If the writers who preceded me had done some groundwork in this area, undoubtedly, I would not have faced such difficulties. It is because bringing out our literary history has been beyond possibility that even a modest work has not emerged until now.

In 1923, Salman Mumtaz published his first research under the title "Forgotten Pages" in the newspaper Kommunist. His first significant success in this newspaper is considered to be his article One of the Azerbaijani Poets: Nasimi. İmadeddin Nasimi's life and work were examined in depth for the first time in Azerbaijani literary studies by Salman Mümtaz. In 1926, Salman Mümtaz published Nasimi's divan in the Azerbaijani language using Arabic script. During the 1920s, while researching Nasimi, Salman Mümtaz wrote that Nasimi had a brother named Shakhandan. He also noted that a famous cemetery in Shamakhi was associated with Shakhandan's name. Based on this, the researcher concluded that Nasimi was born in Shamakhi.

In 1921, Salman Mümtaz, for the first time in history, studied the life and work of Habibi and provided information about him. Mümtaz translated details about Habibi given in Persian by Sam Mirza into Azerbaijani and introduced Habibi as a talented poet. In the article he published about the poet, Mümtaz included one of Habibi's famous ghazals and Fuzuli's takhmis written in response to that poem. Salman Mümtaz was the first to provide information about Habibi's birth date. In the third issue of the journal Füqəra Füyuzatı, published in 1921, Mümtaz stated that Habibi was born between 1470 and 1475.

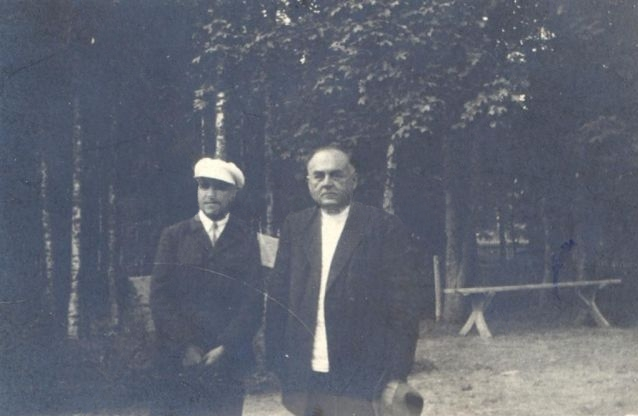
Salman Mumtaz and Habib Samadzade. Habib Samadzade played a role in part of Salman Mumtaz's work.

In 1930, Salman Mümtaz published Shah Ismail Khatai's Divan for the first time. For this purpose, he used a 17th-century manuscript of the Divan preserved in the Manuscripts Fund. Salman Mümtaz was the first to utilize this manuscript. The complete publication of Khatai's Divan was based on this manuscript. In 1923, Mümtaz published an incomplete list of Khatai's 17th-century poem Dahname. This list is currently preserved in Baku at the Manuscripts Institute of the Azerbaijan National Academy of Sciences.

On March 19, 1937, Salman Mümtaz submitted a petition for the establishment of a commission regarding the first volume of Muhammad Fuzuli's works, which he had prepared for publication. The commission documented many works resulting from the scholar's years of research. According to this document, the first volume of Fuzuli's works—Qazals edited by Y. Bertels in Latin script—was in the possession of Habib Səmədzadə. The first part of the second volume in Arabic script—Leyli and Majnun—had been sent to Leningrad to Yevgeny Bertels for editing, while the second part was in Baku. The third volume, "Bengu-Bada", existed in draft form and was in Mümtaz's possession. A 260-page monograph on Muhammad Fuzuli's biography, edited by Y. Bertels, had been transferred to the archives of the Manuscripts Institute. Additionally, the document noted that the Divan of Shah Ismail Khatai, published by Mumtaz in 1934, had been edited by Bekir Chobanzadeh, Tagi Shahbazi, Ali Nazmi, and partially by Hamid Arasli. This Divan is also preserved in the archives of the Manuscripts Institute in Baku.

In 1933, while working as a junior researcher at the newly established Azerbaijan Branch of the USSR Academy of Sciences, Salman Mümtaz compiled a list of 483 Azerbaijani poets, emphasizing the importance of studying their lives and works. He also planned to conduct in-depth research on 104 of these poets.

=== Folklore studies and research on the life and work of oriental poets ===
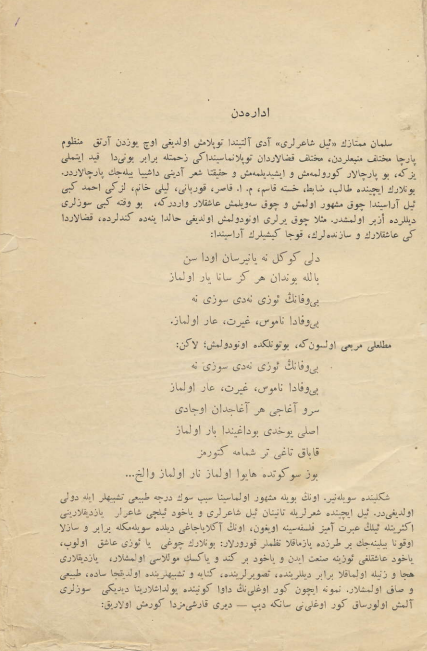
A page from the first edition of the first volume of Salman Mumtaz's "People's Poets", Baku. (The work was published in 1927).

Salman Mümtaz divided literature into two categories: "elite literature" (classical) and "folk literature" (oral art, folklore). He tirelessly worked on the collection and publication of Azerbaijani folklore. From the 1920s onward, Mümtaz actively pursued research in this field, collaborating with notable figures such as Veli Khuluflu, Hanafi Zeynalli and Hummet Alizadeh. As an initial outcome of his work on folk poetry, Mümtaz published Aşıq Abdulla (1927) and Sarı Aşıq (1935). Additionally, his pioneering work in systematizing Azerbaijani folk literature, the two-volume Xalq Şairləri (Folk Poets) (Volume I: 1927–1928; Volume II: 1935–1936), remains a valuable scientific resource. These works also included examples of Azerbaijani ashug poetry, contributing significantly to the preservation and study of Azerbaijan's oral literary heritage.

In addition to researching the life and works of Azerbaijani poets and writers, Salman Mumtaz also studied the activities and lives of other classics of Eastern poetry and published writings about them. The results of Mumtaz's many years of research in the 1920s–1930s on figures such as Ferdowsi, Saadi, Rudaki, Nava'i, and Magtymguly were highly regarded by literary scholars as a "new perspective" on these poets. Mumtaz also introduced Azerbaijani readers to authors such as Al-Farabi, Avicenna, Jalaluddin Rumi, Amir Khusrow Dehlavi, Abdurrahman Jami, Ilia Chavchavadze, and Rabindranath Tagore.

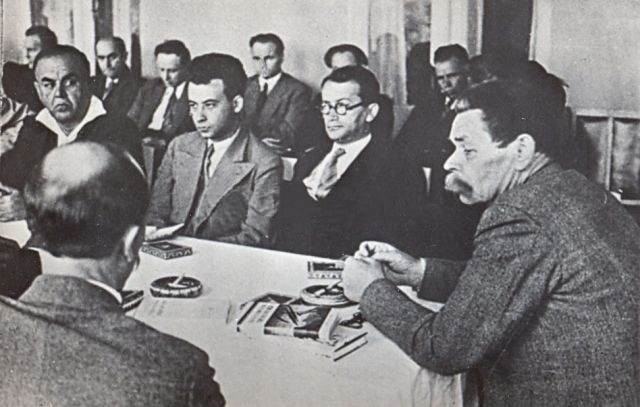
Salman Mumtaz in Moscow (first from the left, photo from 1934).

In 1925–1926, Salman Mumtaz published a series of articles in connection with the 500th anniversary of the birth of the poet Ali Shir Navai. Among these articles were "The Influence of Ali Shir Navai on Azerbaijani Literature" (published in Kommunist newspaper on March 4, 1926) and "Emir Ali Shir Navai" (published in Yeni yol newspaper on March 4, 1926). In these articles, Salman Mumtaz discussed the poetic and artistic characteristics of Navai's works, the language of his poems, the choice of words, and freedom from superfluous thoughts, as well as the influence of Navai's poetry on Azerbaijani literature and vice versa. For the 1000th anniversary of the birth of Firdowsi, Salman Mumtaz published a series of articles in Inqilab və Mədəniyyət magazine (issue No. 9–10, 1934). In one of these articles, Salman Mumtaz discussed the history of the study of Firdowsi’s legacy and analyzed the poet’s famous work, Shahnameh. Salman Mumtaz also conducted research on the Turkish poet Emrah, born and raised in Erzurum, and published several of his poems. This research by Salman Mumtaz was the first outside of Turkey.

== Collection of manuscripts ==
Salman Mumtaz was a collector of the works of classic literature creators. Sometimes, he would gather manuscripts by offering gold, sometimes out of gratitude, and sometimes jokingly saying, "One hand cuts off the giver of the book, two hands cut off the taker," to engage in the collection of manuscripts. Salman Mumtaz traveled across all of Azerbaijan in search of books and manuscripts, visiting cities and districts from Baku to Qakh, Derbent to Lankaran, Gazakh to Quba, and Sheki to Astara. He even traveled abroad to countries like Dagestan, Georgia, Armenia, Russia, and Central Asia in search of ancient and valuable books. For example, Mumtaz traveled to Vladikavkaz to find the work of Ismayil bey Gutgashinli, "Rashid bey and Saadet khanum." During these trips, Mumtaz often stayed in dirty and unsuitable caravanserais, sometimes going without food and water. In 1922, while on one of these trips, he contracted typhus and was bedridden for nearly six months.

Salman Mumtaz had created an unmatched and extensive library with the manuscripts he painstakingly collected. This library contained the third copy of the "Kitabi-Dədə Qorqud" epic after the ones in Vatican and Dresden, the oldest and most perfect manuscript of Muhammad Fuzuli's divan in the world, the first comprehensible copies of Shah Ismail Khatai's "Dahname" and "Nasihatname," and manuscripts of hundreds of famous and powerful Azerbaijani poets. Due to its richness, this library could be compared with the personal libraries of notable literati such as Abdulqadir Nuxavi Khaliseqarizade (1817–1879) and Muhammadali Tarbiat (1877–1940). Another advantage of this library was that most of the manuscripts Salman Mumtaz collected through his extensive research were in the Turkish language.

In addition, Salman Mumtaz collected these manuscripts under very difficult historical circumstances – during this period, individuals who were found with documents written in Arabic script were either shot along with their families or exiled to Siberia. The 1937 repressions dealt a severe blow to the Turkic peoples within the USSR. The decisions made at the First Turkological Congress in 1926 regarding a unified Turkish alphabet and spelling, as well as the emerging Turkish spiritual unity, were largely dismantled by the authorities. Almost all participants in the Congress were declared "panturkist," "nationalist," or "counter-revolutionary," subjected to repression, and executed. The term "Turk" was banned (from 1936 onwards, Azerbaijanis were officially referred to as Azerbaijanis in their nationality). To prevent the Turkic peoples from studying their own history, history books were prepared and altered by foreign authors to keep the history from being fully understood. Ancient Turkish manuscripts and all books written in the Arabic script were destroyed. Salman Mumtaz and his library fell victim to this policy. In October 1937, when Mumtaz was arrested by NKVD officers, all his manuscripts, loaded into two large trucks, were confiscated.

Years later, following a request from Salman Mumtaz’s daughter Şəhla Mumtazzadə to reclaim her father's legacy, information about the fate of Salman Mumtaz's library was obtained with the initiative of Yusif Məmmədəliyev, the president of the Academy of Sciences of the Azerbaijan SSR, and Süleyman Rəhimov, the chairman of the Writers’ Union of Azerbaijan SSR. In 1957, Petrosyan presented a report stating the following: "On October 9, 1937, when Salman Mumtaz was arrested, his personal property was confiscated—12 different books, various dramaturgical materials, 3 bags, and a suitcase of manuscripts, and a package of special materials. However, we have no further information about the subsequent fate of these materials." When asked later about the fate of these manuscripts, Aron Rıbakov, who was involved in their confiscation on October 9, 1937, replied, "They were all Qurans." The archive from the "Coastal" department of the Azerbaijan SSR NKVD stated that based on the directions of writers and scholars familiar with Mumtaz’s activities and library, a list of 238 works would be made, and these works would be located and preserved. Imam Mustafayev, the First Secretary of the Central Committee of the Communist Party of Azerbaijan SSR, initiated this effort, but it was later found that all of Salman Mumtaz’s manuscripts had been destroyed in a fire in the NKVD courtyard.

Currently, only a very limited amount of material remains in Salman Mumtaz's library. These remnants include books and documents that he donated to the Hermitage, the Azerbaijan branch of the USSR Academy of Sciences, as well as manuscripts he had worked on, written, and planned during his time there. Additionally, there are manuscripts and other materials that were overlooked during the arrest night and later presented to the Republic Manuscript Fund (now part of the Manuscript Institute of the Azerbaijan Academy of Sciences).

== Memory ==
Since September 17, 1996, the State Archive of Literature and Art of the Republic of Azerbaijan has been named after Salman Mümtazstreet named after Salman Mümtaz in the city of Sheki. A corner dedicated to Salman Mümtaz is available in the National Library of Turkey.

In Baku, insidding of the Union of Azerbaijani Writers, a memorial plaque has been erected in honor of the 27 Azerbaijani writers who were repressed, with Salman Mümtaz's name inscribed. This plaque was crafted by Elcan Şamilov, a People's Artist of Azerbaijan. Salman Mümtaz's pen, once used by him, has been donated to the Museum of History of Azerbaijan and is currently on display there. The poet Hüseyn Arif mentioned Salman Mümtaz in a verse of his poem "Alim var."

In 1986, the Ph.D. in philology Rasim Tağıyev published an interesting book with Salman Mümtaz’s articles titled "Salman Mümtaz. The Origin of Azerbaijani Literature." The editor of the book was the Doctor of Philology, Professor Əkbər Ağayev, and the reviewer was the academician Məmməd Arif Dadaşzadə. In 2002, historian-journalist Ədalət Tahirzadə explored Salman Mümtaz’s life and work, publishing a 16-page biographical sketch titled "Salman Mümtaz. Biography Sketch" with the "Kür" publishing house. This book is one of the most valuable sources of information about Mümtaz.

In 2013, a film titled "Salman Mümtaz" was produced by the "Azərbaycantelefilm" Creative Union of Azerbaijan Television. The short script, written by Xaliq Rəhimli and adapted by Murad Quliyev, reflected the life and works of the scholar and researcher Salman Mümtaz. The documentary film was shot by the operator Zahid Bağırov.
