= Hanafi Zeynalli =

Azerbaijani Soviet folklorist and critic

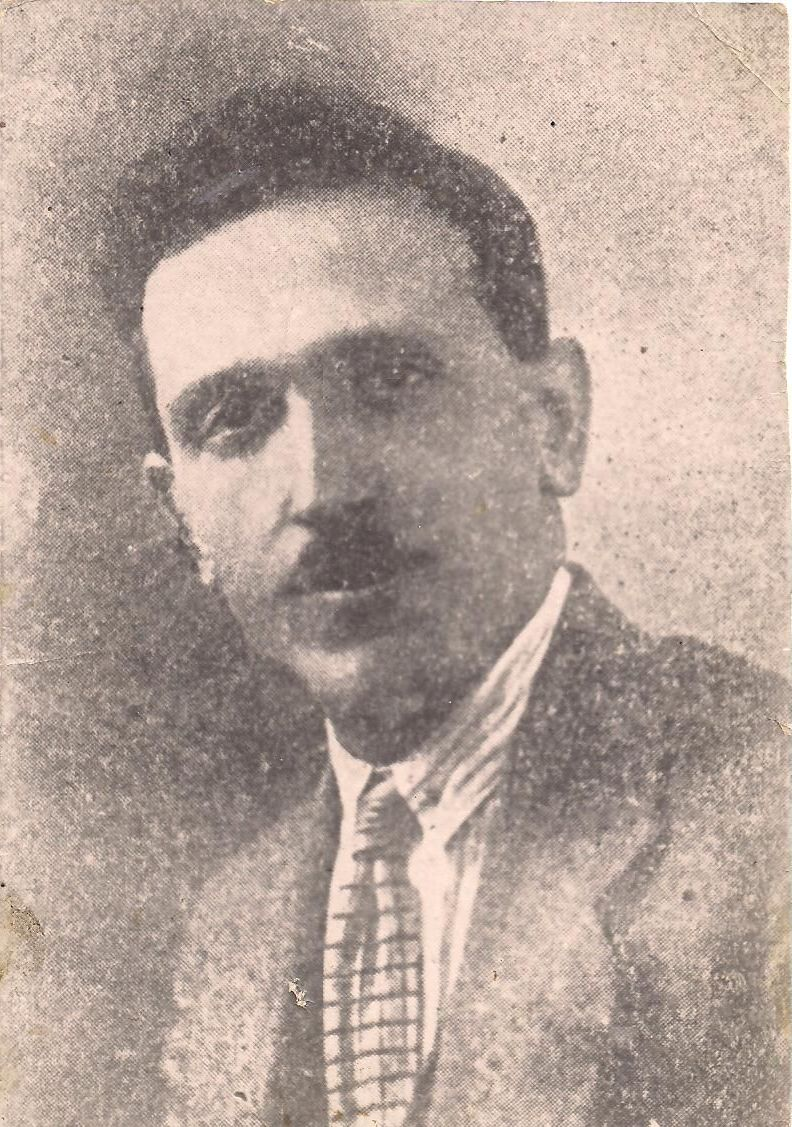
- Native name: Hənəfi Zeynallı
- Born: Hənəfi Baba oğlu Zeynallı; 1896 Mardakan, Baku, Baku Governorate, Russian Empire
- Died: 13 October 1937 (aged 40–41) Baku, Azerbaijan SSR, Soviet Union
- Occupation: Folklorist, literary critic, literary scholar, teacher, orientalist
- Language: Azerbaijani

Hanafi Baba oghlu Zeynalli (Azerbaijani: Hənəfi Baba oğlu Zeynallı; 1896 – 13 October 1937) was an Azerbaijani Soviet folklorist, literary critic, literary scholar, teacher and orientalist. He headed the educational and literary department of the Azerbaijan State Publishing House, collected examples of Azerbaijani folklore, and has been described as one of the pioneers of Azerbaijani folklore studies.

== Biography ==
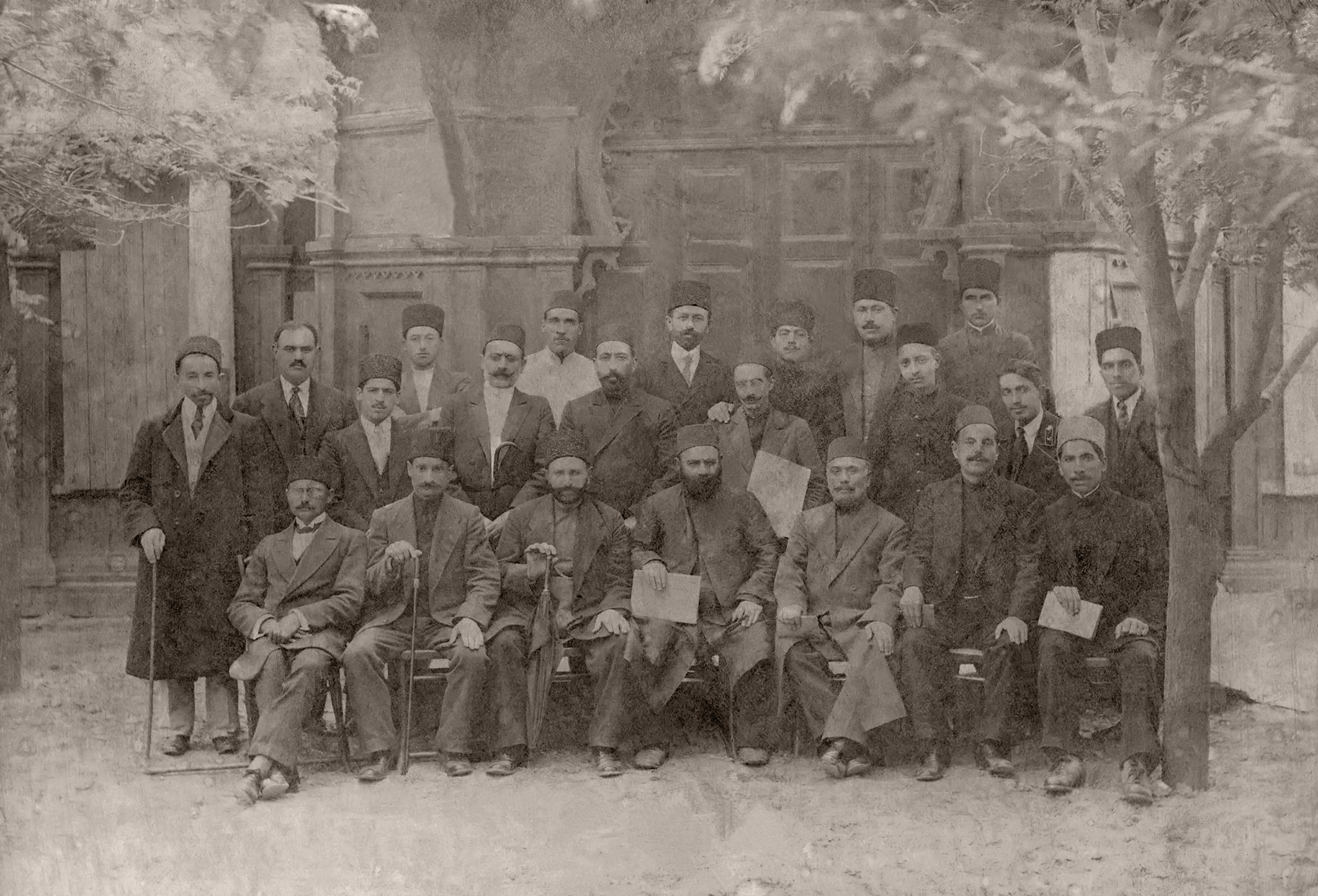
Teachers and poets of Baku, 1916. Hanafi Zeynalli is among the figures in the second and third rows.

Hanafi Zeynalli was born in 1896 in Mardakan, near Baku, into the family of a blacksmith and farrier. He lost his parents at an early age, but continued his education. He studied at a madrasa and later graduated from a Russo-Muslim secondary school. In 1916, he graduated from the Secondary Polytechnic School in Baku and was admitted to the Imperial Technical Vocational School, but was unable to continue his studies after the February Revolution of 1917.

In 1917, he was a member of the Socialist Revolutionary Party, and from 1919 he was a member of the Russian Communist Party (Bolsheviks). According to Xalq qəzeti, Zeynalli enrolled in the Faculty of Law of Istanbul University in January 1920, but returned to Baku later that year after the establishment of Soviet rule in Azerbaijan.

From 1922 to 1927, Zeynalli studied at Azerbaijan State University. He later worked at the Department of the History of Azerbaijani-Turkic Literature of the university's Faculty of Oriental Studies, at the Azerbaijan Pedagogical Institute, and from 1930 at the Department of the History of Azerbaijani Literature of the Azerbaijan State Pedagogical Institute. In 1930, he received the academic title of associate professor.

From 1923 to 1929, he worked as editor-in-chief at the Azerbaijan State Publishing House. He took part in the formation of Azərnəşr and in the organization of the Azerbaijan Society for Study and Research, where he headed the oral literature commission. From 1930 to 1935, he headed the folklore department of the Literature Section of the Institute of Language and Literature of the Azerbaijan branch of the USSR Academy of Sciences. He also contributed literary and journalistic articles to periodicals such as Kommunist, Maarif və mədəniyyət (lit. 'Education and Culture'), İnqilab və mədəniyyət (lit. 'Revolution and Culture'), and Maarif işçisi (lit. 'Education Worker').

Zeynalli's main principles as a critic were connected with an educational interpretation of literature. He contributed to the development of Azerbaijani folklore studies and has been listed alongside figures such as Vali Khuluflu, Salman Mumtaz, Yusif Vazir Chamanzaminli, Hummet Alizade and Hamid Arasli among early Azerbaijani folklorists.

== Folklore studies ==
Zeynalli collected and published examples of Azerbaijani oral literature and wrote theoretical articles on folklore. In 1926, he published Azərbaycan atalar sözləri və məsəllər (lit. 'Azerbaijani Proverbs and Sayings'), which included nearly 4,000 proverbs and sayings. In the introduction to the book, he discussed the origins and genres of folk literature, dividing oral literature into verse and prose forms, and examined the similarities and differences between proverbs and sayings.

In 1928, he published Azərbaycan tapmacaları (lit. 'Azerbaijani Riddles'), where he discussed the theoretical and aesthetic features of riddles. He analysed riddles in connection with other genres of Azerbaijani folklore, especially proverbs and bayatis, and described them as a collective form of oral creativity.

In 1935, Zeynalli compiled and published Azerbaijani fairy tales in Russian. The book was edited by the Russian folklorist Professor Yuri Sokolov. Its introduction discussed the opposition of good and evil in Azerbaijani fairy tales.

Zeynalli participated in the First Turkological Congress, held in Baku in 1926. According to Xalq qəzeti, one of the themes of his work at the congress was the systematic collection and study of Azerbaijani folklore on scholarly principles, including classification by genre, subject and motif, and comparison with the folklore of other Turkic peoples.

During the 1920s, Zeynalli was involved in the preparation of many publications on Azerbaijani oral literature, either as editor or as author of introductory studies. His articles, including Ağız ədəbiyyatı (lit. 'Oral Literature') and Azərbaycan ədəbiyyatı (lit. 'Azerbaijani Literature'), have been noted for their scholarly value. His educational works included Türk ədəbiyyatı üzrə iş kitabı (lit. 'Workbook on Turkish Literature'), Ədəbiyyat dərsləri (lit. 'Literature Lessons'), and Ədəbiyyat müntəxabatı (lit. 'Literary Anthology').

== Critical writings on Huseyn Javid ==
Zeynalli wrote critical articles on the works of Huseyn Javid and was among the early Soviet critics who wrote on Javid's literary legacy. In his writings, he attempted to explain the social and philosophical features of Javid's work. In a 1926 article, Zeynalli wrote that Javid's works were similar in form to the works of Abdulhak Hamit Tarhan, resembled Tevfik Fikret in style, and were close in philosophical outlook to Rıza Tevfik Bölükbaşı.

His article Hüseyn Cavidin yazdığı "Peyğəmbər" haqqında mülahizələrim (lit. 'My Reflections on Huseyn Javid's "The Prophet"') discussed questions of literary criticism, literary history and the specific nature of literature. Zeynalli also wrote on Javid's plays, including Sheikh Sanan, Sheyda and Maral. According to literary scholar Mammad Jafar, Zeynalli was one of the first Soviet critics to give an objective assessment of Javid's work.

== Arrest and execution ==
Hanafi Zeynalli was arrested on 27 January 1937 on accusations of counter-revolutionary activity. He was accused of maintaining contacts with people associated with national ideology and the statehood of the Azerbaijan Democratic Republic, including Nazim Efendi, Ismayıl Hikmet, Khəlil Fikrat and Bekir Çobanzade. He was also accused of including counter-revolutionary and nationalist ideas in his works. Before his arrest, he had been dismissed from his position at a research institution.

During the investigation, Zeynalli signed several statements and later withdrew them. According to Репрессированная тюркология, the interrogations were conducted by Galustyan, who was himself later executed. Xalq qəzeti states that the statements used against him included accusations of distributing anti-Soviet literature, belonging to a clandestine nationalist organization, recruiting others into it, and supporting the separation of Azerbaijan from the Soviet Union.

The Military Collegium sentenced him to death, and the sentence was carried out in Baku on 13 October 1937.

On 30 March 1957, Hanafi Zeynalli was posthumously rehabilitated by a decision of the Military Collegium of the Supreme Court of the Soviet Union.

== Family ==
Zeynalli was married to Sayyara Sattar qizi Zeynalli, who was born in Baku on 1 October 1907 and received higher education. They had two children, Azer, born in 1930, and Zemfira, born in 1933. In 1937, Sayyara Zeynalli was arrested as the wife of a so-called "traitor to the motherland" and sentenced to eight years' imprisonment and exile. After her release, she lived in Zagatala. In 1956, she was fully rehabilitated by a decision of the Supreme Court of the Azerbaijan SSR.
