= Hikmet Cevdet-zade =

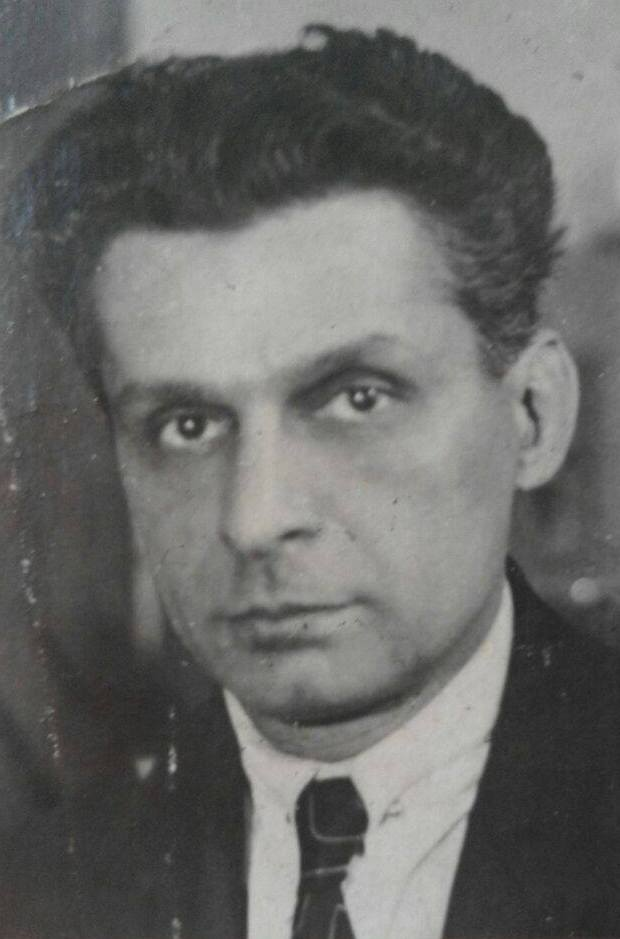
- Born: 1893; Istanbul, Ottoman Empire
- Died: April 17, 1945 (aged 51–52); Kansk, Russian SFSR, Soviet Union
- Citizenship: Soviet Union
- Education: Istanbul Pedagogical Institute
- Children: Fazilet, Jale, Yavuz

Hikmet Cevdet-zade (Hikmet Cevdet-zade; 1893, Istanbul, Ottoman Empire – 17 April 1945, Kansk, Soviet Union) was a prominent Soviet Turkologist, linguist, literary scholar, and university professor. He was a victim of the Stalinist repressions.

== Biography ==
Hikmet Cevdet-zade began his education at a general public school in Istanbul in 1899, graduating in 1909. He then studied at a gymnasium from 1904 to 1910 and graduated from the Istanbul Pedagogical Institute in 1913.

In 1918, he moved to Batumi, where in 1924 he founded a Turkish school. He was married to Naime Suleymanovna Kakabadze, who also worked as a teacher in Batumi.

In 1926, on assignment from the People's Commissariat of Education of Adjara, Hikmet was sent to study at the Leningrad Institute of Oriental Studies. In the late 1920s, he also taught Turkish language at the same institute.

He took part in the First All-Union Turkological Congress as a delegate from Georgia.

During the 1930s, he held the position of associate professor and later full professor at LVI. He also lectured at the Leningrad Institute of Philosophy, Literature and History until 1934, and at the N. G. Kuznetsov Naval Academy from 1931 to 1934.

In November 1933, he was appointed as a research fellow at the Institute of Oriental Studies of the Russian Academy of Sciences.

=== Arrest and death ===
He was arrested on 11 September 1937 and sentenced on 10 November 1939. He died in a prison camp in Kansk on 17 April 1945. He was posthumously rehabilitated in 1957.

== Academic achievements ==
Hikmet Cevdet-zade played an important role in the development of Turkish grammar, teaching methodology, and Turkish language education in the Soviet Union. A talented educator and graduate of the Istanbul Pedagogical Seminary, he served as associate professor at the Leningrad Institute of Oriental Studies (1926–1937) and lectured at Saint Petersburg State University (1933–1937).

He authored several key textbooks:

- Speak Turkish: A Phrasebook (Leningrad, 1927),
- Turkish Reader (with glossary) (Leningrad, 1931),
- Grammar of Modern Turkish (Leningrad, 1934; co-authored with Andrey Kononov), and other materials published with mimeograph through LVI in collaboration with H. M. Tsovikyan, Sergi Jikia, and A. N. Kononov.

The Grammar of Modern Turkish was the first grammar using the Latin alphabet after the Turkish language reform and one of the earliest systematic grammars in the Soviet Union.

He was also involved in compiling a Turkish Socio‑Political Reader (LVI, 1935, mimeographed) and planned work on the History of Turkish literature (19th–20th centuries).

== Selected works ==
- Cevdet-zade H. Speak Turkish: Phrasebook. – Leningrad, 1927.
- Cevdet-zade H. Turkish Reader. – Leningrad, 1931.
- Cevdet-zade H. Grammar of Modern Turkish: (Phonetics, Morphology and Syntax). (with Andrey Kononov). – Leningrad, 1934.
- Cevdet-zade H. Turkish Reader for 3rd and 4th year courses (with Andrey Kononov, S. S. Jikia, and H. M. Tsovikyan). – Leningrad, 1935.
