= Valentin Zhukovsky =

Russian Empire orientalist

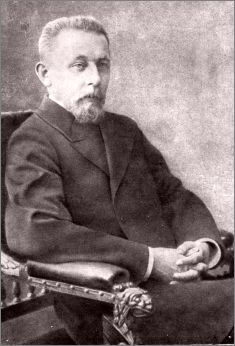
Photography

Valentin Alekseevich Zhukovski (Zhukovsky; Валентин Алексеевич Жуковский; May 6, 1858 – January 17, 1918) was a Russian Iranologist renowned for his research on Sufism and Persian grammar.

Born in Voronezh, Zhukovsky enrolled in the Oriental Faculty of St. Petersburg University, where he studied under Viktor Rosen and Carl Salemann. His sisters married such famous scholars as Vasily Bartold and Nikolai Marr.

From 1883 to 1886, he was on a research trip to Persia, where he studied local dialects and Persian literature. He was the first in the Russian Empire to study Sufism and wrote much on the subject.

Together with Salemann, he prepared the first scientific grammar of the Persian language (Persische Grammatik mit Literatur-Chrestomatie und Glossar, 1889). He became a professor at St. Petersburg University (1889).

In 1890, he was sent by the Imperial Archaeological Commission to the Transcaspian region, where he explored the ruins of Merv. In 1899, he was elected a corresponding member of the St. Petersburg Academy of Sciences.

He was the first to seriously study the authenticity of quatrains attributed to Omar Khayyam (Omar Khayyam and the 'Wandering' Quatrains, 1897).

Zhukovsky was buried at the Novodevichy Cemetery in Saint Petersburg.
