= Vasily Yakovenko =

Soviet military commander and politician (1889–1937)

- Василий Яковенко
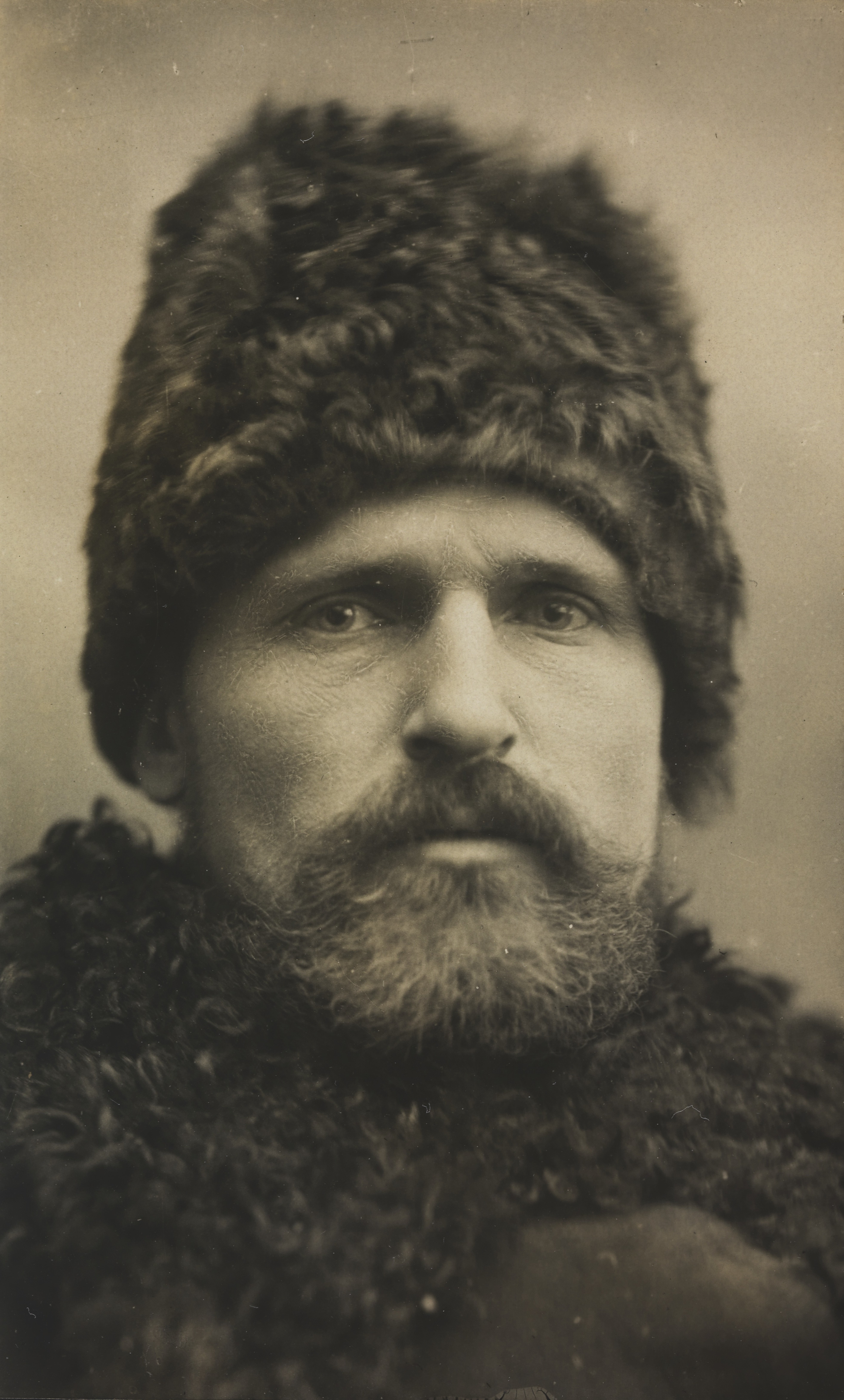
- Yakovenko in 1920

4th People's Commissar of Agriculture of the Russian Socialist Federative Soviet Republic
- In office 9 January 1922 – 7 July 1923
- Premier: Vladimir Lenin
- Preceded by: Valerian Obolensky (Deputy People's Commissar); Semyon Sereda
- Succeeded by: Alexander Smirnov

2nd People's Commissar of Social Security of the Russian Socialist Federative Soviet Republic
- In office 7 July 1923 – 10 May 1926
- Prime Minister: Alexei Rykov
- Preceded by: Alexander Vinokurov
- Succeeded by: Iosif Nagovitsyn

Personal details
- Born: 15 March 1889 Taseyevo, Russian Empire
- Died: July 29, 1937 (aged 48) Moscow, Russian SFSR, Soviet Union
- Party: Communist Party of the Soviet Union
- Spouse: Raisa Abramovna Yakovenko
- Awards: George Cross

Vasily Grigoryevich Yakovenko (Russian: Васи́лий Григо́рьевич Якове́нко; 15 March [O.S. 3 March] 1889 – 29 July 1937) was a Soviet military commander and politician who organised Red Army partisan divisions in Siberia during the Russian Civil War. He later served as People's Commissar of Agriculture of the Russian Socialist Federative Soviet Republic (1922–1923) and People's Commissar of Social Security of the Russian Socialist Federative Soviet Republic (1923–1926).

== Biography ==
From a peasant family, at the age of nine, he was left an orphan. He worked as a laborer. In 1910, he was drafted into the army and served in the engineering units for four years. From 1914, he participated in the First World War, the non–commissioned officer, according to his own recollections, was awarded the Saint George Cross three times, but this fact has no documentary evidence. In July 1917, he joined the Russian Social Democratic Labor Party (Bolsheviks). Returning to Taseyevo, at the end of the same year, he became chairman of the Taseevsky Volost District.

After the Czechoslovak Revolt, which overthrew the Soviet regime in the region, he went underground. In December 1918, he led the uprising in Taseevo and organized a partisan struggle against the Kolchak Troops. He became one of the founders of the partisan army, which numbered up to 15 thousand people. Chairman of the Council of the North Kansk Partisan Front, led the fight against the Kolchak regime until the end of January 1920.

From 1920 to 1922, he was chairman of the Kansk Revolutionary Committee and the county executive committee. At the beginning of 1922, he was appointed Deputy Chairman of the Krasnoyarsk Provincial Executive Committee, but was soon summoned to Moscow. On the recommendation of Ivan Teodorovich, who personally knew him, on 9 January 1922, he was appointed People's Commissar of Agriculture of the Russian Socialist Federative Soviet Republic. He is listed as an ardent supporter of the New Economic Policy.

Among the possible candidates for this post, let me name one figure who, in my opinion, has a lot of data for this. This is Vasily Grigoryevich Yakovenko, a Siberian, a peasant, an old–timer of the village of Taseevsky, the richest village in the Kansky District, the richest in Eastern Siberia. According to external data, this is a man in his 40s, a tall, powerful, hairy bearded man from a plow, in love with the "earth". ... In my opinion, he will be very appropriate in the post of peasant people's commissar. His discipline and devotion to Soviet power are beyond doubt.

— Letter from Ivan Teodorovich to Vladimir Lenin, 12 December 1921

From 1923 to 1926, People's Commissar of Social Security of the Russian Socialist Federative Soviet Republic. Delegate of the 12th–13th Congresses of the Russian Communist Party (Bolsheviks), in 1924–1925 – member of the Central Control Commission of the Russian Communist Party (Bolsheviks). He was a member of the All–Russian Central Executive Committee. Since 1928, he worked in the reception room of the chairman of the Central Executive Committee, Mikhail Kalinin, as chairman of the land and election commission. From 1932 to 1935 – in the State Planning Commission of the Soviet Union, he was a member of the presidium and chairman of the national bureau. Since 1935, he was first a member of the board of the Research Institute of New Bast Crops under the People's Commissariat for Agriculture of the Soviet Union in Moscow, and then the director of this institute.

Arrested on 9 February 1937, sentenced on 29 July 1937, by the Military Collegium of the Supreme Court of the Soviet Union to capital punishment and shot on the same day, buried in the cemetery of the Donskoy Monastery. Rehabilitated on 30 June 1956, by the Military Collegium of the Supreme Court of the Soviet Union.

== Family ==
First wife – Maria Alexandrovna Mullova. The second wife, Raisa Abramovna Yakovenko, was repressed as the wife of an "enemy of the people", spent 19 years in camps and exile, then lived in Moscow.

== Awards ==
The Notes of a Partisan mentions the awarding of Vasily Grigorievich with three Saint George Crosses, however, there is no data on these awards in the consolidated lists of holders of the Saint George Cross.

== Bibliography ==
- Notes of a Partisan, Moscow, Commission on the History of the October Revolution and the Russian Communist Party (Bolsheviks), 1925

== Remembrance ==
In 2013, a monument to Vasily Grigorievich Yakovenko was erected in the village of Taseevo.

== Sources ==
- Yury Zhurov. Vasily Yakovenko // History of the Soviet Union. 1969. No. 3
- Great Soviet Encyclopedia (in 30 Volumes), 3rd Edition. Moscow: 1969–1978
- Alexander Sheksheev. Vasily Yakovenko – Siberian Partisan, People's Commissar // Questions of History – 2013 – No. 1 – Pages 118–133
