= Iosif Nagovitsyn =

Iosif Alekseevich Nagovitsyn
- Иосиф Алексеевич Наговицын
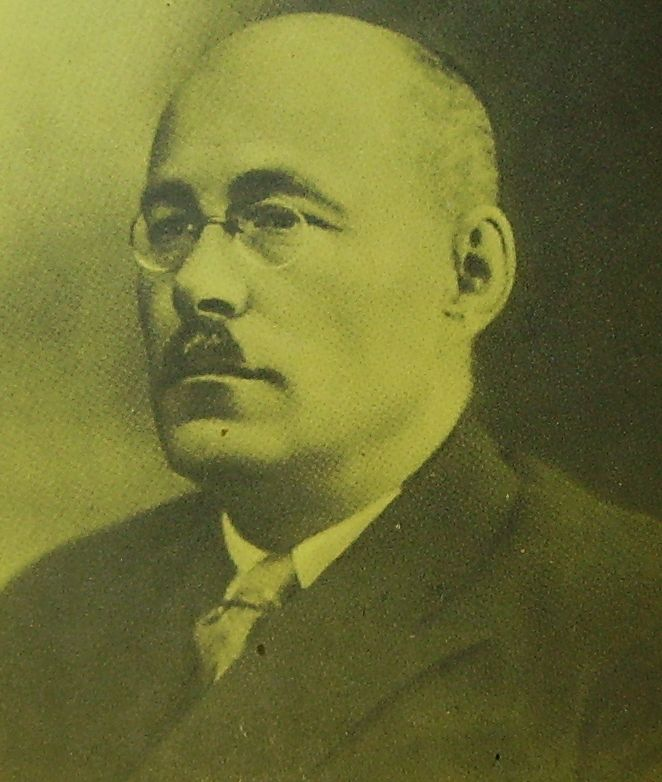

3rd People's Commissar of Social Security of the Russian Soviet Federative Socialist Republic
- In office May 10, 1926 – August 1937
- Preceded by: Vasily Yakovenko
- Succeeded by: Maria Shaburova

1st Chairman of the Regional Executive Committee of the Votyak Autonomous Region
- In office January 1921 – August 1925
- Preceded by: Office established
- Succeeded by: Trofim Borisov

Personal details
- Born: September 18, 1888 Omutnitsa, Glazovsky Uyezd, Vyatka Governorate, Russian Empire
- Died: November 21, 1937 (aged 49) Miskhor, Koreiz Village Council, Yalta City Council, Crimean Autonomous Soviet Socialist Republic, Russian Soviet Federative Socialist Republic, Soviet Union
- Party: All–Union Communist Party (Bolsheviks)
- Education: Vyatka Agricultural School

Iosif Alekseevich Nagovitsyn (September 18, 1888 – November 21, 1937) was a Soviet statesman, People's Commissar of Social Security of the Russian Soviet Federative Socialist Republic (1926–1937).

== Biography ==
Born in the village of Omutnitsa (now in the Glazovsky District of Udmurtia) in an Udmurt peasant family. He graduated from a three–year school, entered the Glazov City School, where in 1903, he became close to the Marxists. From 1904, he studied at the Vyatka Agricultural School, where he became a member of the Social Democratic Circle. In 1905, he was expelled from the school for participating in a student strike. He actively participated in the revolution: he distributed leaflets, campaigned among the peasants in Russian and Udmurt languages. In 1905–1907, he conducted party work in Vyatka, Glazov, Yekaterinburg, then was sent to Kyshtym, where he became a member of the Ufaley–Kyshtym District Committee of the Russian Social Democratic Labour Party. Conducted campaign work during the elections to the Second Duma. In 1907, he was arrested, in 1908, he was exiled to the Yenisei Governorate. In 1913, he emigrated, lived in Belgium, France, Great Britain, participated in foreign organizations of the Bolsheviks. At the end of 1918, he returned to Russia, worked at the Yakov Sverdlov Communist University, from 1919, he headed the Votyak Commissariat – the department of the People's Commissariat for Nationality Affairs. Since 1921, Chairman of the Revolutionary Committee of the Votyak Autonomous Region, chairman of the executive committee of the Regional Soviet, member of the Bureau of the Regional Committee of the Russian Communist Party (Bolsheviks). In 1925–1926, he was a member of the board of the People's Commissariat of Education of the Russian Socialist Federative Soviet Republic, Chairman of the Council for the Education of National Minorities.

In 1926–1937 – People's Commissar of Social Security of the Russian Soviet Federative Socialist Republic.

He died in 1937 from pulmonary tuberculosis in a sanatorium in Miskhor, Crimea. He was treated in the sanatorium "Mountain Sun". The year of death contributed to the widespread myth in literature that Nagovitsyn was arrested, sentenced to death and shot.

Reburied at the Old City Cemetery of Yalta from the Livadia Cemetery. Iosif Nagovitsyn was the great–uncle of Sergey Nagovitsyn.

== Remembrance ==
- On October 28, 1957, the former Budyonny Lane, by the decision of the executive committee of the Izhevsk City Council, was named Nagovitsyn Street;
- Streets in Mozhga and Glazov were named after Nagovitsyn;
- On November 24, 2020, the deputies of the State Council of the Udmurt Republic included Nagovitsyn's birthday in the list of memorable dates of the republic.
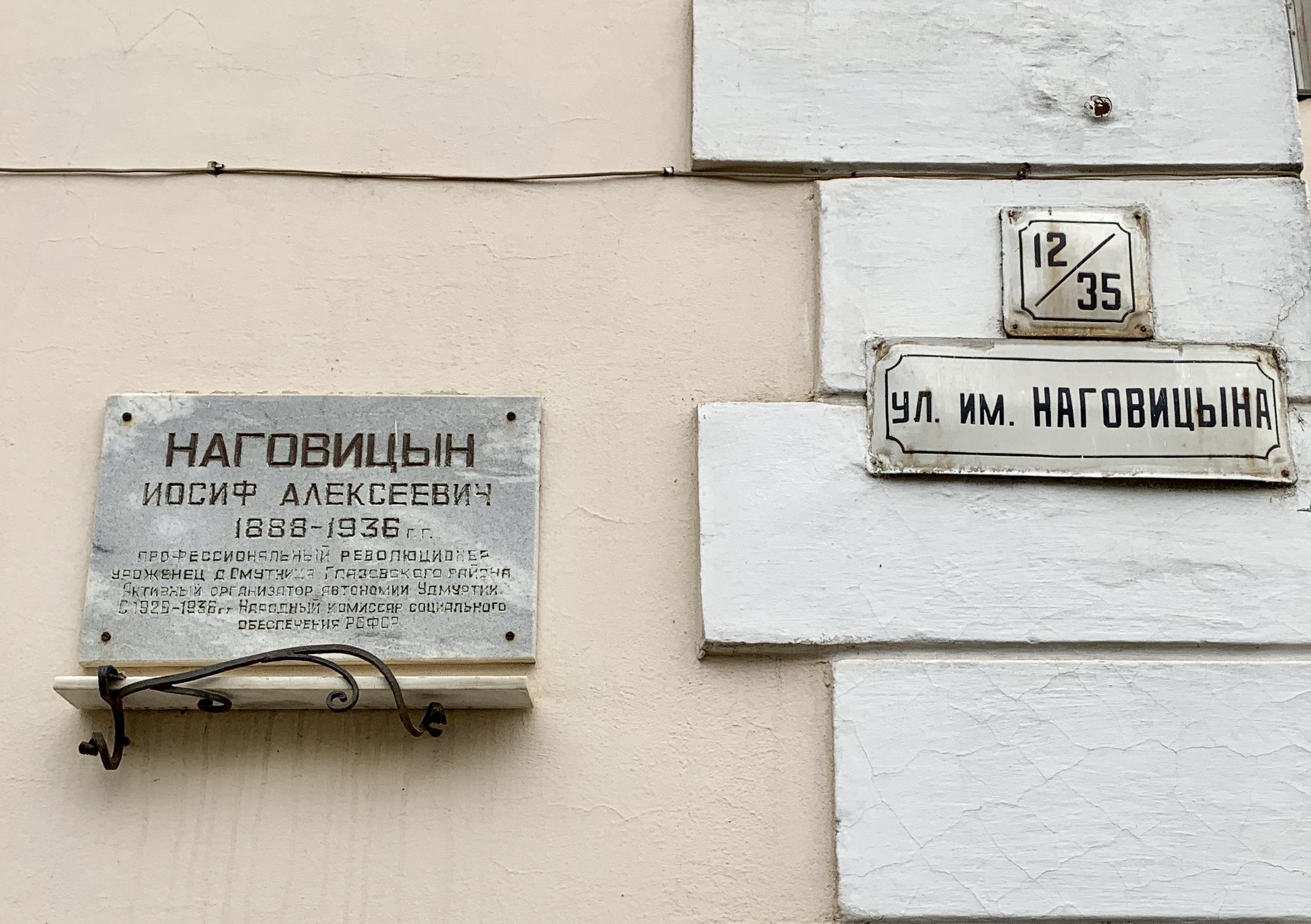
Commemorative plaque on a house on Nagovitsyn Street in Glazov

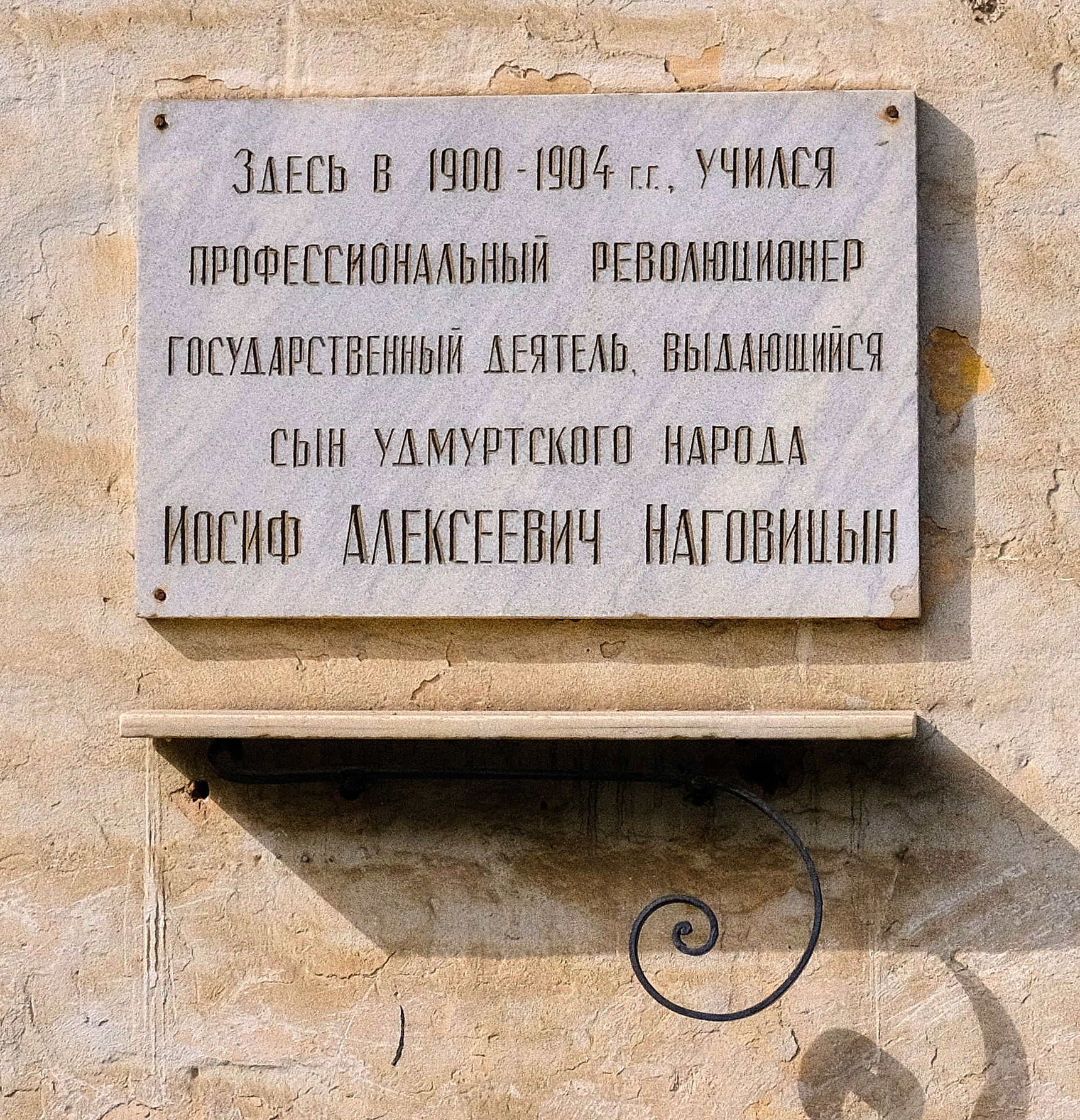
Commemorative plaque on House 39 on Pervomayskaya Street in Glazov

== Sources ==
- Pavlov, Nikifor (1988). Iosif Nagovitsyn. Izhevsk: Udmurtia.
