= Vasily Bartold =

Russian Islamic and Turkic historian (1869–1930)

Vasily Barthold
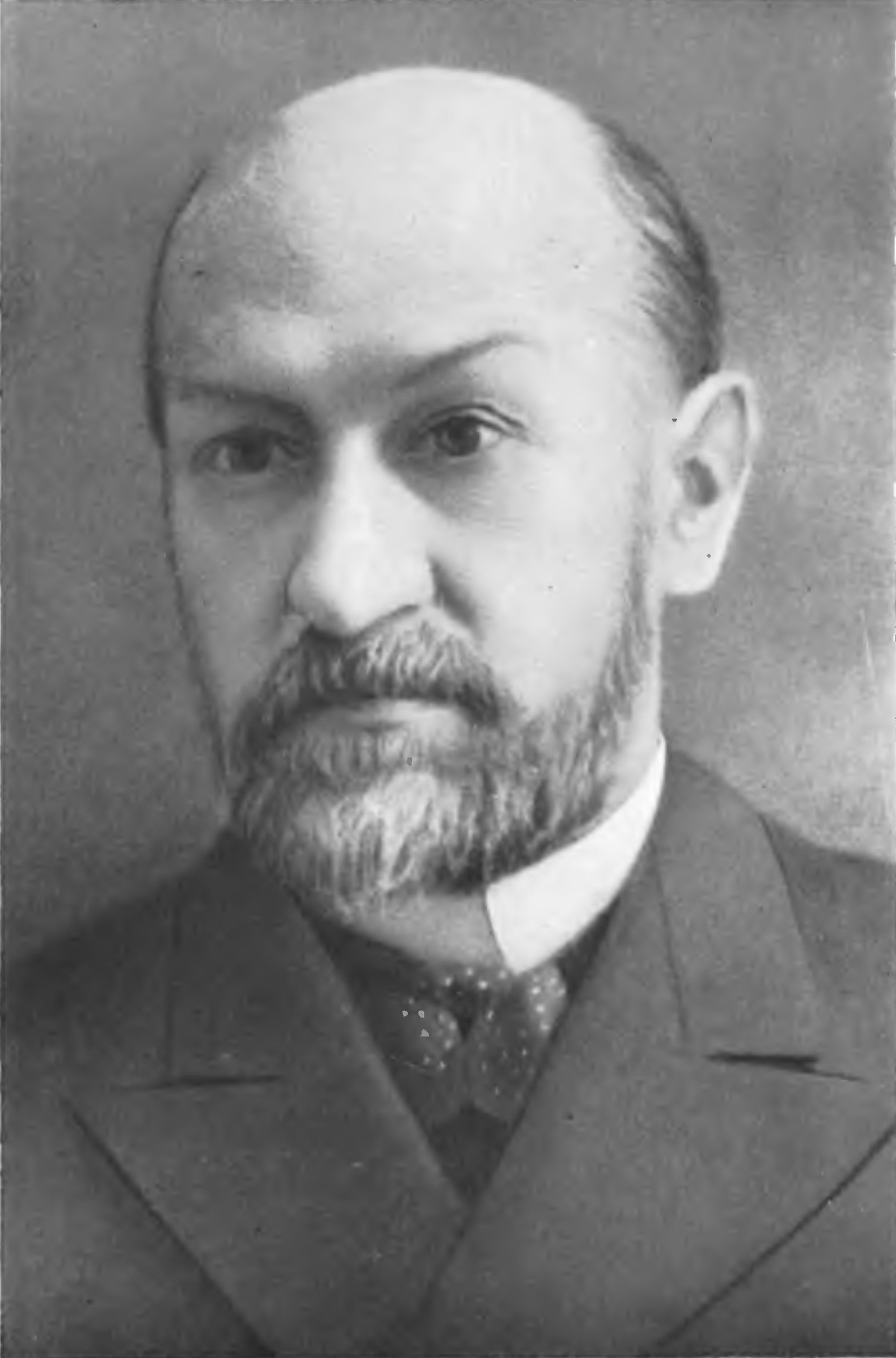
- Born: 15 November [O.S. 3 November] 1869; Saint Petersburg, Russian Empire
- Died: 19 August 1930 (aged 60); Leningrad, Soviet Union
- Occupation: Historian

Vasily Vladimirovich Bartold (Russian: Васи́лий Влади́мирович Барто́льд; (Note: The following spellings can be found: Vasilij V. Bartolʹd, Vasilij Vladimirovič Bartolʹd, Vasilij Bartolʹd, Vasilij Vladimirovič Bartolʹdu, Wilhelm Barthold, W. Berthold, Wīlhilm Bārtuld, Vasilij Vladimirovič Barthold, V. V. Barthold, Polish: Wasilij Władimirowicz Bartołd.) 15 November [O.S. 3 November] 1869 – 19 August 1930), who published in the West under his German baptismal name, Wilhelm Barthold, was a Russian orientalist who specialized in the history of Islam and the Turkic peoples (Turkology).

== Biography ==
Barthold was born in Saint Petersburg to a Russianized German family. His career spanned the last decades of the Russian Empire and the first years of the Soviet Union.

In 1899, Stanley Lane-Poole's book The Mohammedan Dynasties was published in Barthold's translation with numerous corrections of the translator.

In 1900, after defending his thesis Turkestan in the Age of the Mongol Invasion (Parts 1 and 2, Saint Petersburg, 1898–1900), Bartold received the degree of Doctor of Oriental History.

In 1901, Bartold was appointed Extraordinary and in 1906 Ordinary Professor of St. Petersburg University.

He was the secretary of the Russian Committee for the Exploration of Central and East Asia, founded in 1903.

In 1904, he made archaeological excavations in the vicinity of Samarkand. In 1910 he was elected corresponding member of the Academy of Sciences, and in 1913, Ordinary Academician in the category "Literature and History of Asian peoples".

In 1912, in the work "The Caliph and the Sultan" Bartold made a scientific discovery: he proved that the idea of the transfer of spiritual power of the last Abbasid Caliph al-Mutawakkil III to the Ottoman sultan Selim Yavuz in the 16th century is a legend that appeared not earlier than the 18th century.

Barthold's lectures at the University of Saint Petersburg were annually interrupted by extended field trips to Muslim countries. In the two volumes of his dissertation (Turkestan down to the Mongol Invasion, 1898–1900), he pointed out the many benefits the Muslim world derived from Mongol rule after the initial conquests. Barthold was the first to publish obscure information from the early Arab historians on the Kievan Rus'. He also edited several scholarly journals of Muslim studies, and contributed extensively to the first edition of the Encyclopaedia of Islam. In 1913, he was elected to the Russian Academy of Sciences. In May 1913, Bartold undertook a scientific trip to the Southern Ural, Siberia and Central Asia, visiting Orenburg, Ufa and the village of Sterlibashevo, Sterlitamak district, Ufa province. In February 1917 he was appointed to the Commission for the Study of the Tribal Composition of the Population of the Borderlands of Russia.

After the October Revolution, Bartold was appointed director of the Peter the Great Museum of Anthropology and Ethnography, a post he held from 1918 to 1921. He wrote three authoritative monographs on the history of Islam, namely Islam (1918), Muslim Culture (1918) and The Muslim World (1922). He headed the College of Orientalists, established in 1921 at the Asian Museum. One of the important tasks he was involved in during the first years of Soviet rule was the creation of a written language for the peoples of the Russian Soviet Federative Socialist Republic and the USSR who lacked a written language and the replacement of the Arabic alphabet with the Cyrillic alphabet for the Muslim countries of Soviet Central Asia.

Bartold was one of the participants and organizers of the First All-Union Turkological Congress in Baku (1926).

In 1924–1926, he visited Baku, where he took an active part in the organization of the Oriental Faculty at the Baku State University by the professors of the Leningrad and Kazan Universities. Especially for the students at this university he delivered the series of lectures "History of Azerbaijan" and "On the place of the Caspian regions in the history of the Muslim world", where he analyzed the historical significance of some cities of Azerbaijan, in particular Baku.

In Baku he met with scientists, teachers, local administration, visited museums, mosques, the Shah's palace, fortress and cemeteries. In addition to his work in Baku, he was engaged in preserving the mausoleums of Nizami Ganjavi, Ferdowsi and Korkut and translated the Oghuz epic The Book of Korkut Ata.

He got acquainted with and translated some manuscripts from the collection of Azerbaijan University Library and Sabir Library. He read reports at the meetings of the historical and ethnographic section of the Society for the Survey and Exploration of Azerbaijan at the Baku House of Education and at the First All-Union Turkological Congress in Baku (1926). The information he collected about the city of Baku is included in the article "Baku" in the first edition of the Encyclopaedia of Islam.

He visited many libraries in the world (England, Germany, France, Turkey and others), the USSR (Leningrad, Moscow, Tashkent, Baku and others). The main purpose of his trips abroad and throughout the Soviet Union was the exploration of eastern manuscript collections. His good knowledge of the work of libraries allowed him not only to give lectures on the history of archival work for the students of the Archival Courses at the Petrograd Archaeological Institute (1918), but also to make articles and reviews on the state of libraries and their manuscript departments, to make suggestions on the collection of materials, their disclosure through catalogues, etc.

In January 1927, he was invited by Nikolai Marr to the Leningrad Public Library as a consultant on the works of the Eastern Department with payment from scientific credits, and from 1 February 1928 he was enrolled as a non-staff employee.

Most of his writings were translated to English, Arabic, and Persian. Barthold's collected works were reprinted in 9 volumes between 1963 and 1977, and while Soviet editors added footnotes deploring his 'bourgeois' attitudes, his prestige was such that the text was left uncensored, despite not conforming to a Marxist interpretation of history. Some of his works have been reprinted more recently in Moscow.

== Family ==
His wife was Maria Zhukovskaya (1868-1928), younger sister of orientalist Valentin Zhukovsky.

== Works ==
- (in Russian) «Туркестан в эпоху монгольского нашествия» (St. Petersburg: 1900)
  - (in English) Turkestan Down to the Mongol Invasion (London: Luzac & Co) 1928 (Trans. H. A. R. Gibb); online
- (in Russian) «Улугбек и его время» Ulugh-Beg (Leyden: 1918)
  - (in German) "Ulug Beg und seine Zeit". In Abhandlungen für die Kunde des Morgenlandes 21, No. 1, (Leipzig:Brockhaus) 1935, ISSN 0567-4980 (Trans. Walther Hinz)
  - (in English) "Ulugh-Beg". In Four Studies on the History of Central Asia Vol. II (Leiden: E.J. Brill) 1958 (Trans. V. & T.Minorsky)
- Mussulman Culture (Kolkata: University of Calcutta) translated from Russian by Hasan Shaheed Suhrawardy 1934.
- (in Russian) «Тюрки. Двенадцать лекций по истории турецких народов Средней Азии» [The Turks : twelve lessons on the history of the Turkic peoples of Central Asia]
  - (in German) Zwölf Vorlesungen über die Geschichte der Türken Mittelasiens (Darmstadt: Wissenschaftliche Buchgesellschaft, 1932/35 and 1962)
- (in English) "A Short History of Turkestan" (1956). In Four Studies on the History of Central Asia Vol. I (Leiden: E.J. Brill) 1956 (Trans. V. & T.Minorsky)
- (in English) An Historical Geography of Iran (Princeton: Princeton University Press) 1984 (translated by Svat Soucek; edited by C.E. Bosworth)
- (in Russian) Собрание сочинений (Москва: Издательство Восточной литературы) 1963-77 9 Vols.—Complete works
- (in Russian) Отчет о поездке в Среднюю Азию с научною целью (С.Пб.: Тип. Имп. Академии Наук) 1897
- (in Russian) История культурной жизни Туркестана (Москва: Изд. Академии наук СССР) 1927
- (in Russian) Работы по исторической географии (Москва: Изд. фирма «Восточная литература» РАН) 2002

== Notes ==
Preceded by Vasily Radlov	Director of the Peter the Great Museum of Anthropology and Ethnography; 1918–1921	Succeeded by Yefim Karskiy
