= Azernashr =

Azerbaijani publisher

Azernashr (Azərnəşr)
- Parent company: Ministry of Culture of Azerbaijan
- Founded: 1923
- Country of origin: Azerbaijan
- Headquarters location: Baku
- Publication types: Books
- Nonfiction topics: Literature, education, academic works, translation

Azernashr (Azerbaijani: Azərnəşr) is a major publishing house in Azerbaijan. It is the official state publishing house, based in Baku.

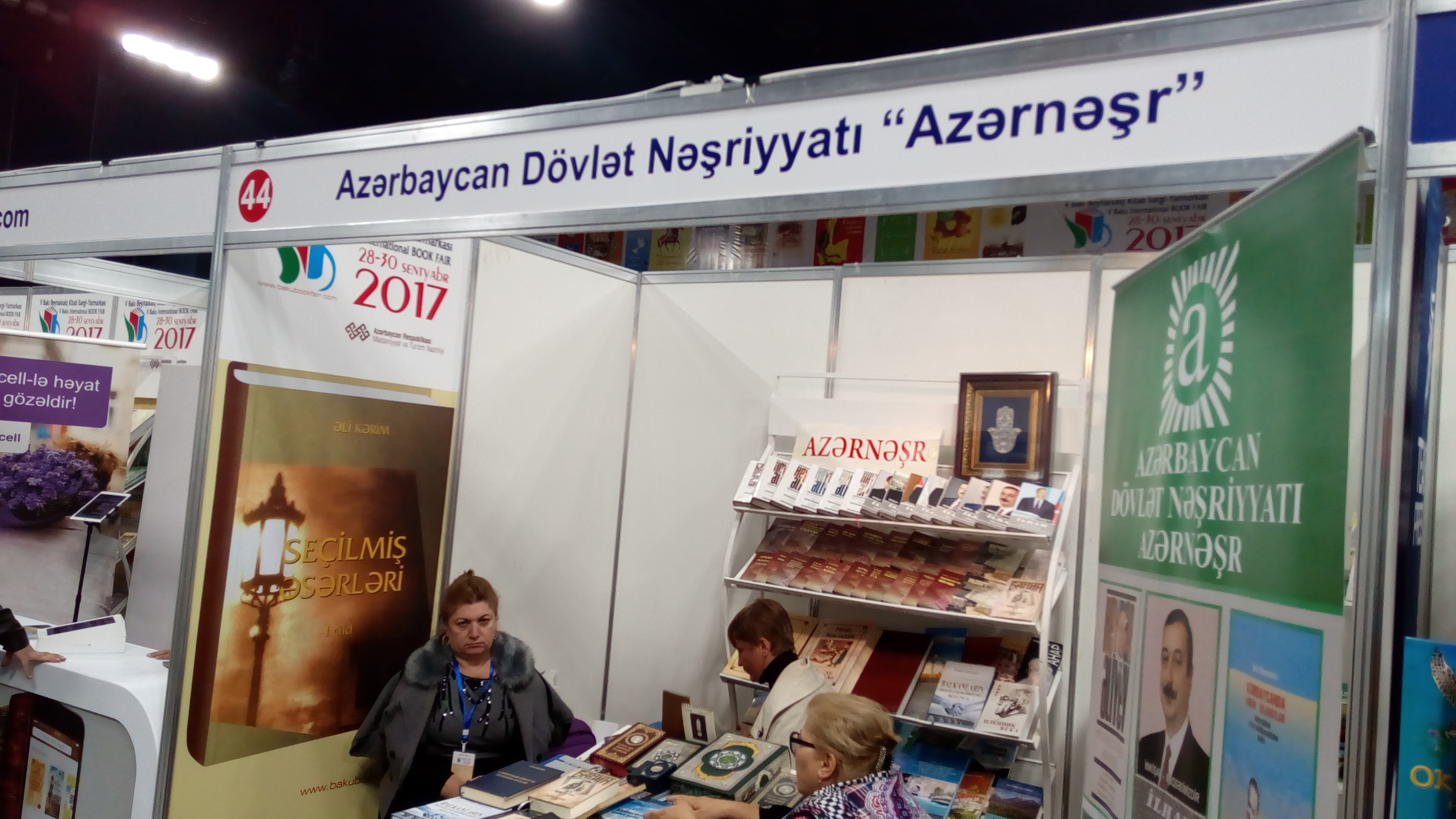

Azerneshr started its operations in 1923. Within the period of existence, the publishing house produced tens of thousands of books on different subjects. It has published a number of books in Russian, English, French and other languages. Apart from major European languages, Azerneshr also publishes in languages of minorities such as Talysh, Tat, Lezgi, Kurdish, Udi and Khinalug languages.

== History ==
According to Azerbaijani sources, Azernashr, officially known as the Azerbaijan State Publishing House, is regarded as the first state-run publishing house in the "Eastern" world, a designation that in this context refers to the broader cultural and historical region traditionally described in Azerbaijan as the East. Its creation marked a turning point in the cultural, educational, and political life of early Soviet Azerbaijan. Although the roots of centralized publishing in Azerbaijan date to 1920, the publishing house began operating under the name Azərnəşr in 1925.

Efforts to establish a unified state publishing system intensified after the Soviet takeover. On 9 June 1920, Nariman Narimanov, Chairman of the Revolutionary Committee of Azerbaijan, signed Decree No. 40 establishing the Press and State Publishing Department, known as Azərmərkəzimətbuat, under the People's Commissariat for Education. The decree mandated the centralization of all publishing activities of state, party, and public bodies. Narimanov emphasized the publication of scientific-popular literature and school textbooks as an early priority. Ağababa Yusifzadə became the first director, laying the foundation for what later became Azernashr.

In its early years, Azernashr played a crucial role in producing textbooks and educational materials. By the mid-1920s, it had begun publishing children’s literature, fiction, propaganda works, and academic titles. According to archival data, between 1923 and 1933 the publishing house issued over 5,600 titles across Azerbaijani and Russian, totaling nearly 20 million copies. During this period, Azernashr became central to the formation of book typology, editorial standards, and artistic design in Azerbaijan.

The construction of a dedicated Press Palace (Mətbuat sarayı) began on 8 November 1927 in central Baku, and the building officially opened in 1933. For decades it housed Azernashr along with other major publishing and printing organizations. From 1933 until 1995, Azernashr operated in this historic building, which is now registered as an architectural monument of local significance. Until 2001, the publishing house functioned as an independent state enterprise and at times accounted for up to half of all book production in the republic.

Throughout the 20th century, Azernashr became a leading center for translation literature. The publishing house maintained a dedicated translation department from its early years, employing such major Azerbaijani writers and translators as Ahmed Javad, Yusif Vazir Chamanzaminli, Jafar Jabbarly, Mammed Said Ordubadi, and Nigar Rafibeyli. Works of world classics were published in high-quality Azerbaijani translations and large print runs.

Azernashr also served as an intellectual hub for many prominent Azerbaijani cultural and political figures. Writers, scholars, editors, and translators such as Jafar Jabbarly, Omar Faig Nemanzadeh, and Vəli Xuluflu worked at the publishing house in various capacities. During the Soviet period, particularly under Heydar Aliyev’s leadership in the 1970s, the publishing sector experienced significant growth, and Azernashr released major works of fiction, scholarly literature, and translated world classics. In 1975, its 50th anniversary was celebrated at the state level, and Azernashr became the first publishing house in the USSR to be awarded the Order of Friendship of Peoples.

During the post-Soviet period, Azernashr continued to publish major works on Azerbaijani history, national identity, and political thought. In 1990, the publishing house secretly released Qara Yanvar (Black January) in Russian, documenting the January 20 tragedy shortly after it occurred. Following independence, Azernashr contributed to the international communication of the Azerbaijani perspective on the Nagorno-Karabakh conflict, publishing multilingual studies refuting the claims of the Armenian genocide. In 2015, ahead of the centenary of those events, the publishing house released a series of 17 books in four languages authored by international scholars.

Since 2001, Azernashr has operated under the Ministry of Culture of Azerbaijan. Beginning in 2008, the publishing house undertook the release of the multi-volume series İnkişaf — Məqsədimizdir (Development Is Our Goal), documenting the political activities of President Ilham Aliyev. As of 2025, 146 volumes have been prepared.

Following Azerbaijan’s victory in the Second Nagorno-Karabakh War, Azernashr intensified its work on publications related to the conflict, including studies of the "liberation" of Karabakh, memorial volumes dedicated to fallen soldiers, and books on the cultural heritage of Shusha and other territories.

=== Relocation and the status of the Press Palace building ===
In 1995, Azernashr and several other publishing entities, including the state publishers İşıq and Gənclik as well as the "26-lar" printing house, were relocated from the historic Press Palace. The premises were subsequently assigned to the private Bank Standard. Since that time, Azernashr has operated from a smaller facility on Mehdi Hüseyn Street.

Following the closure of Bank Standard, the Press Palace has remained vacant. Azerbaijani journalists and cultural figures have periodically raised concerns over the building’s unused status and have called for its return to Azernashr on the grounds of its historical and cultural significance. Advocates of the move argue that the building - conceived as a centre for publishing and the press - could once again house multiple media organisations and serve as a dedicated venue for press and public events.

In the context of Azernashr’s 100th anniversary in 2025, these appeals have intensified, with commentators describing the publisher as "displaced" from its historical home and urging state authorities to restore the Press Palace to its original purpose.
