= Vali Khuluflu =

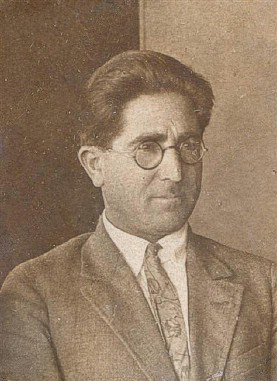
- Native name: Vəli Xuluflu
- Born: Vəli Məmmədhüseyn oğlu Xuluflu; 26 May 1894 Khuluflu, Shamkir, Russian Empire
- Died: 13 October 1937 (aged 43) Azerbaijan SSR, Soviet Union
- Occupation: Literary scholar, folklorist, linguist, publicist
- Language: Azerbaijani

Vali Mammadhuseyn oghlu Khuluflu (Azerbaijani: Vəli Məmmədhüseyn oğlu Xuluflu; 26 May 1894 – 13 October 1937) was an Azerbaijani literary scholar, folklorist, linguist and publicist. He was involved in the collection, publication and study of Azerbaijani oral literature, including ashig poetry, riddles and versions of the Koroghlu epic. Khuluflu was executed during the Great Purge and was posthumously rehabilitated.

== Early life and education ==
Vali Khuluflu was born on 26 May 1894 in the village of Khuluf in present-day Shamkir District. From 1905 to 1907, he received his early education at a traditional religious school. He later studied at Mədrəseyi-ruhaniyyə (lit. 'Spiritual Madrasa'), and worked at the same school after completing his studies.

In 1917, Vali Khuluflu completed teacher-training courses in Ganja. After the Sovietization of Azerbaijan, he worked in Ganja from 1920 to 1922, including as secretary of the Ganja District Committee of the Azerbaijan Communist Party. He was later expelled from the party during internal party purges, but was restored to party membership in 1927. From 1922 to 1927, he studied at the Faculty of Oriental Studies of Azerbaijan State University.

== Career ==
During his university years, Khuluflu worked as an instructor of the All-Union New Turkic Alphabet Committee. He also worked with the publishing house Bakı fəhləsi (lit. 'Baku Worker') and as an editor at Azərnəşr.

From 1929 to 1933, Khuluflu worked at the Azerbaijan State Scientific Research Institute, where he served as scientific secretary and director of the Language, Literature and Art section. He later held several academic and administrative posts, including head of the Central Archive Administration, deputy chairman of the State Scientific Council, and deputy director of the Institute of History of the Azerbaijan branch of the USSR Academy of Sciences.

Vali Khuluflu was also involved in the activities of the Society for the Study and Promotion of Azerbaijan. In 1928, he participated in the First Congress of Azerbaijani Ashigs in Baku, where he became acquainted with several ashigs whose works later formed part of his folklore collections.

On the tenth anniversary of the Transcaucasian Federation, Khuluflu was awarded an honorary certificate and a gold watch for his public, scholarly and literary services.

== Literary and scholarly activity ==
Vali Khuluflu was an active supporter of the transition to the Latin-based New Turkic Alphabet. His book Yeni türk əlifbası ilə yazı qaydaları (lit. 'Writing Rules with the New Turkic Alphabet'; 1925) was published as a practical work on the new alphabet.

He travelled through different regions of Azerbaijan to collect examples of oral literature. He was sent on scholarly trips to Shamkir, Tovuz and Qazakh by the Society for the Study of Azerbaijan, and collected ashig poems, riddles, sayings and epic material.

In 1927, Khuluflu published two branches of the Koroghlu epic based on material recorded from ashig Huseyn Bozalganli. The first edition included the branches Toqat səfəri and Bağdad səfəri. In 1929, he published a fuller Latin-script edition under the editorship of Hanafi Zeynalli, containing four branches and additional narrative material. The new branches included material recorded from Ashig Asad.

Khuluflu paid attention to the principles of folklore collection, including variant forms, regional features and information about performers. In his editions of Koroghlu, he generally preserved the structure of the recorded text, while avoiding forms that would make the material difficult for a wider readership to understand.

Khuluflu compiled and published El aşıqları (lit. 'Folk Ashigs'), issued in the series Azərbaycan xalq ədəbiyyatından materiallar (lit. 'Materials from Azerbaijani Folk Literature'). The book included biographical information and poetic examples from ashigs such as Qurbani, Khasta Qasim, Ashig Alasgar and Ashig Huseyn Shamkirli, as well as the Reyhan epic attributed to Huseyn Shamkirli. The work has been described as one of the early publications that helped establish principles for collecting and studying ashig poetry in Azerbaijan.

In Tapmacalar (lit. 'Riddles'), Khuluflu published 726 Azerbaijani riddles arranged alphabetically. He indicated the places where the riddles had been collected and preserved regional linguistic features. In the introduction, he discussed riddles as a form of folk literature connected with everyday life, social experience and the natural environment.

His other works included İmla lüğəti (lit. 'Spelling Dictionary'; 1929), Panislamizm, imperializm və ruhaniyyət (lit. 'Pan-Islamism, Imperialism and Clergy'; 1929), Din və qadın (lit. 'Religion and Woman'; 1930), Din və mədəni inqilab (lit. 'Religion and Cultural Revolution'; 1930), Səlcuq dövlətinin tarixi quruluşuna dair (lit. 'On the Historical Structure of the Seljuk State'; 1930), and Məhərrəmlik münasibətilə (lit. 'On the Occasion of Muharram').

== Arrest, execution and rehabilitation ==
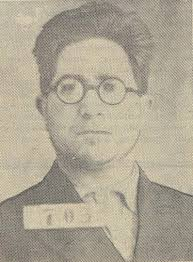
Vali Khuluflu after his arrest in 1937

Vali Khuluflu was arrested on 28 February 1937 on charges of membership in a counter-revolutionary nationalist organization. According to later accounts, his book Tapmacalar was among the materials used against him, with investigators searching for hidden political meanings in the riddles. His home was searched, and he was accused of anti-Soviet activity.

According to Xalq qəzeti, his case was heard on 12 October 1937 in a closed proceeding without witnesses, a prosecutor or a defence lawyer. The hearing reportedly lasted about twenty minutes. Khuluflu was sentenced to death and executed on 13 October 1937.

His wife, Fatma Khuluflu, was later sentenced to eight years' imprisonment as the spouse of a so-called "enemy of the people". Their family was also evicted from their home in Baku.

Khuluflu was rehabilitated on 17 November 1956. In 1957, the criminal case against Fatma Khuluflu was also closed. After her appeal, the Military Collegium of the Supreme Court of the Soviet Union annulled the decision of 12 October 1937 against Khuluflu and closed the case. His burial place is unknown.

== Legacy ==
After his rehabilitation, Khuluflu began to be described in official and scholarly sources as a literary scholar, publicist, intellectual and public figure. His work on the collection of Azerbaijani folklore, especially ashig poetry, riddles and the Koroghlu epic, has been noted in later studies of Azerbaijani literature and folklore.

Streets in Baku, Ganja and Shamkir have been named after Khuluflu. In Shamkir District, a secondary school and a house of culture also bear his name.
