= Code name: "VXA" =

2022 play by Mehriban Alakbarzada

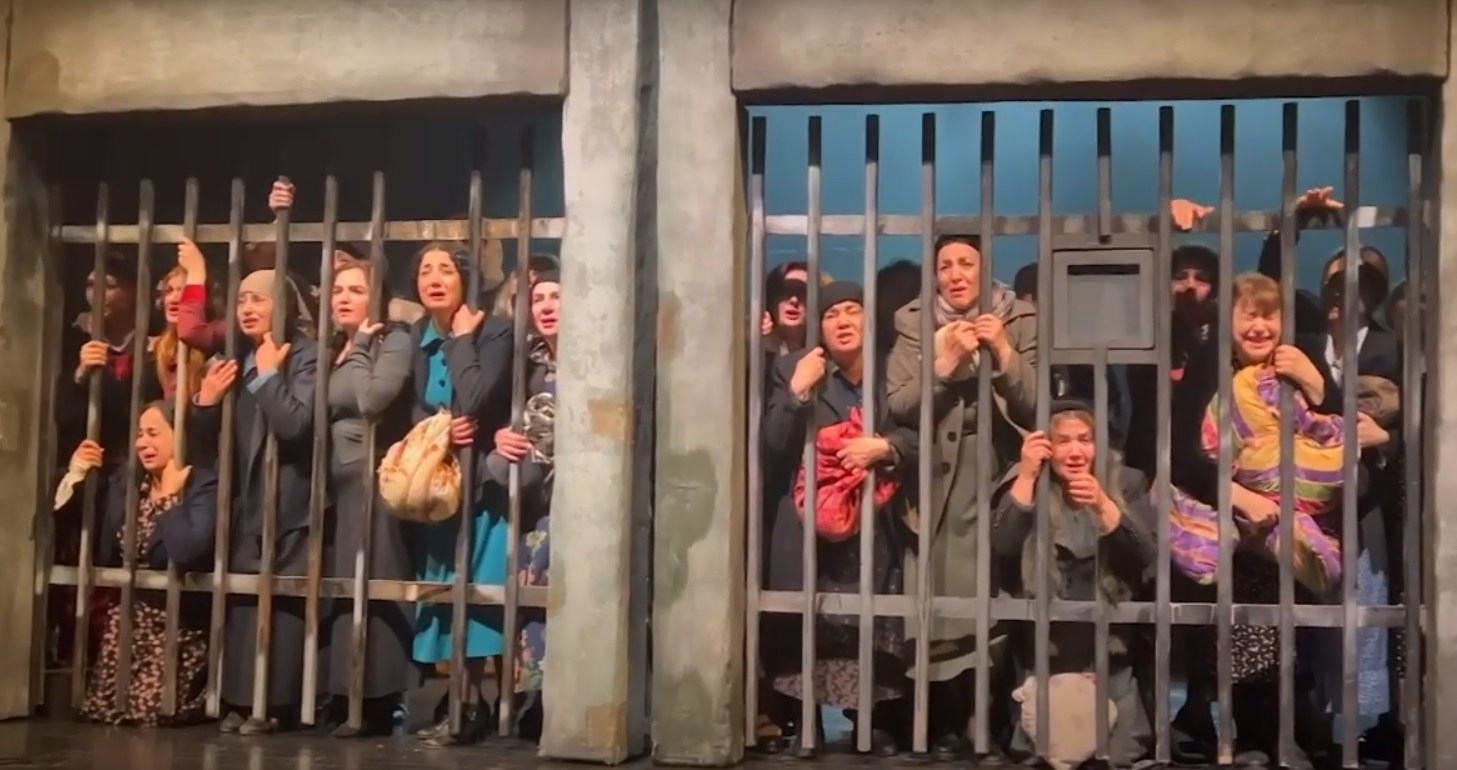
- From the play Codename VXA
- Original title: Kod adı: "V.X.A.”
- Written by: Mehriban Alakbarzadeh
- Based on: Stalinist repressions in Azerbaijan
- Music by: Azer Hajiasgarli

Premiere
- Directed by: Mehriban Alakbarzadeh

Code name: "VXA" or Code name "Wives of Traitors" (Azerbaijani: Kod adı: "V. X. A.") ― a play that premiered at the Azerbaijan State Theatre of Young Spectators on 17 December 2022.

The play is about the events that happened to the spouses of political prisoners who were repressed during the Stalinist repressions.

== About ==
The author of the work, based on historical facts, is Mehriban Alakbarzadeh. The work describes the lives of women in exile who suffered from Stalinist repressions in Azerbaijan in the 1930s. The performance is dedicated to the 130th anniversary of the poet Ahmad Javad, to the great intellectuals who were victims of repression, and to their family members and wives.

The premiere of the play was held on 17 December 2022 at the Azerbaijan State Theatre of Young Spectators.

The play depicts the lives of 37 Azerbaijani women who were exiled to the poetess including the poetess Ümmügülsümün, the poetess and Mikayil Mushfig's wife Dilbər Axundzadə, the wife of Ahmed Javad, Şükriyyə Cavadın, the actress Panfiliya Tanailidinin, the pianist Xədicə Qayıbovanın, the director of the Guba Girls' Seminary Sənubər Eyyubova, the educator Madina Qiyasbayli, and the public and political figures Ceyran Bayramovanın, Ayna Sultanovanın who were imprisoned or exiled, based on real facts.

== The cast of the play ==
Creative team

- Executive director - Mehriban Ələkbərzadə
- Constructivist painter — Mustafa Mustafayev
- Composer — Azer Hajiasgarli
- Lighting designer — Vadim Kuskov
- 2nd Directors — Nihad Gulamzade, Gulnar Hajiyeva
- Assistant directors — Günay Qasımova, Sevda Hacışəmiyeva

In roles

- Kəmalə Müzəffər — 30024 — Şükriyyə Bejanidze
- Leyli Vəliyeva — 2385 — Ceyran Bayramova
- Qəmər Məmmədova — 30037 — Umgülsüm Sadıqzadə
- Şəfəq Əliyeva — 28965 — Xavər Qarayeva
- Günel Məmmədova — 2496 — Ayna Sultanova
- Gülər Nəbiyeva — 30418 — İzzət Vəzirova
- Aygün Fətullayeva — 10506 — Dilbər Axundzadə
- Səbinə Məmmədzadə — 30419 — Şövkət Məmmədxanova
- Asya Atakişiyeva — Aydan Hesenzade. 30415 — Tamara Hüseynova
- İlqarə Tosova — 1775 — Zivər Əfəndiyeva
- Zülfiyyə Alhüseynova — 30510 — Panfiliya Tanalidi
- Mehriban Abdullayeva — 2239 — Firəngiz Rzayeva
- Sevinc Əziz — 29954 — Xədicə İsmayılova
- Zemfira Əbdülsəmədova — 22482 — Güllü Camalbəyova
- Könül Əbilova — 30789 — Anna Kisilyova
- Nübar Novruzova — 30585 — Sitarə Qarayeva
- Fəridə Qurbanova — 30212 — Xədicə Qayıbova
- Naibə Allahverdiyeva — 23346 — Kriminal avtoritet
- Könül Şahbazova — 30418 — Mariya Paşina
- Yasəmən Məmmədova — 82185 — Yelizaveta Qorbunova
- Nəsibə Eldarova — 30221 — Kövsər Seyidbəyli
- Xalidə Əliməmmədova — 82231 — Xədicə Kəngərlinskaya
- Nuriyyə Əliyeva — 2385 — Gülarə Qədirbəyova
- Şəbnəm Hüseynova — 2334 — Suğra İsazadə
- Simuzər Ağakişiyeva — 1314 — Sənubər Eyyubova
- Mehriban Hüseynova — 29997 — Natalya Talıblı
- İradə Rəşidova — 30001 — Məryəm Mirqədirova
- Güşvər Şərifova — 29998 — Ruhiyyə Qurbanova
- Gülbəniz Lətifova — 29981 — Firuzə Eminbəyli
- Hüsniyyə Əhmədova — 2230 — Mədinə Qiyasbəyli
- Xəyalə Qasımova — 30610 — Mələk Qədirli
- Zümrüd Quliyeva — 1746 — Alyona Şaxova
- Aybəniz Heydərova — 29988 — Nəimə Məmmədova
- İlahə Əmirxanova — 30073 — Anastasiya Qasımova
- Nuranə Hüseynova — 30527 — Fəridə Salamzadə
- Venera Abbasova — 10222 — Səfurə Səlimova
- Kərəm Hadızadə — Qəzənfər Musabəyov
- Araz Pirimov — Həmid Sultanov
- Nofəl Vəliyev — Bakuyev
- Vahid Əliyev — Qoca qazax
- Hilal Dəmirov — Məmməd
- Bəhram Əliheydər — Orxan
- Anar Səfiyev — Şaban
- Nurlan Süleymanlı — Əziz
- Şövqi Hüseynov — investigator
- İlham Əsədov — investigator
- Vüqar Məmmədəliyev — investigator
- Elnur Kərimov — investigator

== See also ==
- Museum of Political Repression Victims
- ALZhIR
- ALJİR (roman)
