= Azerbaijan gadini =

Azerbaijani women's magazine

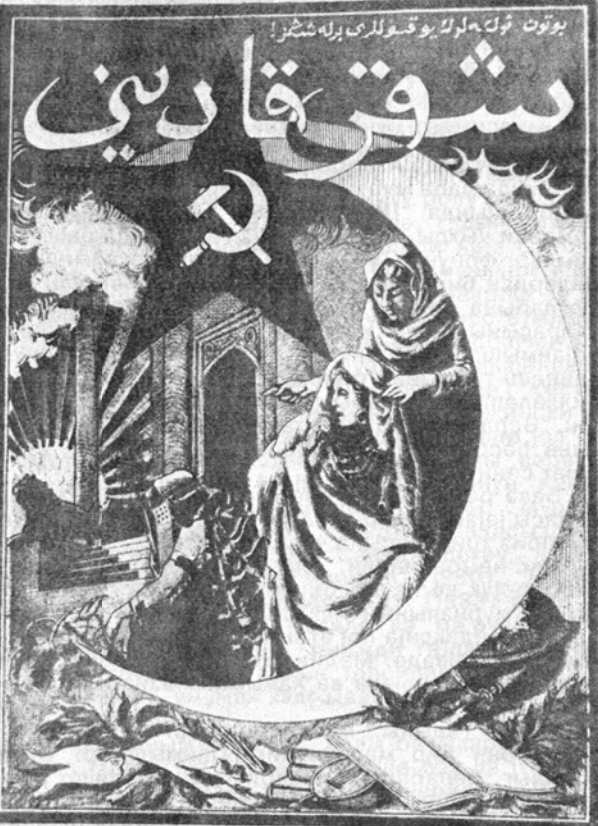
- The cover of the first issue of the magazine.
- Editor: Fatma Abdullazadeh
- Founded: 1923
- Country: Azerbaijan
- Language: azerbaijani, russian

Azerbaijan gadini (Azerbaijani: Azərbaycan qadını – "Woman of Azerbaijan") is an Azerbaijani-language women's magazine. It was founded in 1923 and was named "Sharg gadini" (Azerbaijani: Şərq qadını – "Woman of the East") until 1938. Sharg gadini was the first magazine in Azerbaijan to advocate for women's rights and spread ideas of freedom among women. The magazine was the main print organ of Azerbaijani Zhenotdel. Sharg gadini was designed for Muslim women, to educate them about their rights and promote the Communist Party's agenda of incorporating Muslim women into the economic, political, and social aspects of the socialist state in Azerbaijan.

"Sharg gadini" also has been noted in some sources as the first women's publication in Azerbaijan, because, "Ishig" newspaper remained overlooked for many years.

The magazine is currently published in Baku under the editorship of Fatma Abdullazadeh in a new format.

== History ==
=== Background ===
In 1920s Azerbaijan, Soviet leaders aimed to end gender segregation, veiling, illiteracy, and underage marriages. They went further by pioneering equal rights for Muslim women in public life, work, payment, and land ownership, supported by courts and law enforcement. To garner support, Communist leaders used print media, to raise awareness and promote the integration of Muslim women into the socialist state's economic, political, and social life. In 1914, under Vladimir Lenin's order, "Rabotnitsa" started to serve as the official publication of Zhenotdel. Following "Rabotnitsa," publications like Kommunistka (1920-1930), Krestyanka (1922), and Delegatke (1927) emerged to address women's labor, the issues of working women, and bourgeois feminism, aiming to reach a broader audience. However, due to being written in Russian and not adapting to the dynamics of different regions, magazines such as Krasnaya Sibiryaçka (Novosibirsk), Rabotnitsa i Krestyanka (Simbirsk and Leningrad), Trujenitsa (Tiflis), Rabotnitsa Armenii (Yerevan), Svobodnaya Jenşina (Kazan) and others began publication in each region's native language, addressing their specific dynamics.

=== Publication ===
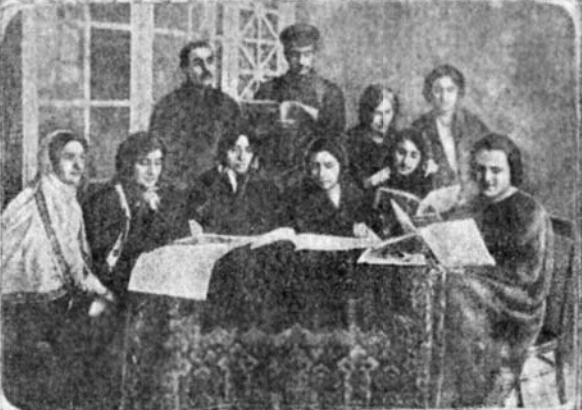
Members of editorial board of "Sharg gadini". Sitting from left to right: (unidentified person), Mina Mirzoeva, Shafiga Efendizadeh, Ayna Sultanova, Khadidzha Azizbekova, and Klavdiia Ishkova. Standing from left to right: Mirza Fatali Akhundov, Aliheydar Garayev, Frida Shlemova, and Khavar Shabanova-Karaeva. Baku, 1923.

In its early years, Sharg gadini was launched in 1920 as a bi-weekly wall newspaper for women, distributed at women clubs like "Ali Bayramov" by Azerbaijani Zhenotdel officials. In June 1923, Aliheydar Garayev, the Secretary of the Azerbaijan Communist Party, Habib Jabiyev, the editor of the "Komunist" newspaper, and Ayna Sultanova, a member of the party's women's department, put forward the idea of creating a women's magazine. On July 2, 1923, the Central Committee of the Azerbaijan Communist Party officially established the magazine "Sharg gadini" as the major print organ of Zhenotdel, that aimed to influence Azerbaijani women to embrace Soviet-style modernity.

The first issue of the publication was released on 30 November 1923. By naming the magazine "Sharg gadini", which means "Woman of the East" in Azerbaijani language, party officials emphasized the enlightening objective of the publication: to liberate all Soviet Muslim women and girls from ignorance. "Sharg gadini" was published monthly and initially printed in Arabic script.

Chief-editor of the magazine was one of the first Azerbaijani revolutionaries, Ayna Sultanova. She led the magazine between 1923 and 1931. The members of the editorial board were Shafiga Afandizadeh, Madina Qiyasbayli, Mina Mirzayeva, and Xanimnaz Azizbeyova. The first issue consisted of 40 pages with a circulation of 1000 copies and featured articles by the publicist Samad aga Agamalioglu, writer and publicist Shafiga Efendizadeh, pediatrician, former Minister of Public Health of the Azerbaijan Democratic Republic, Yevsey Gindes, and literary critic, professor Ismail Hikmet.

=== Repressions and name change ===
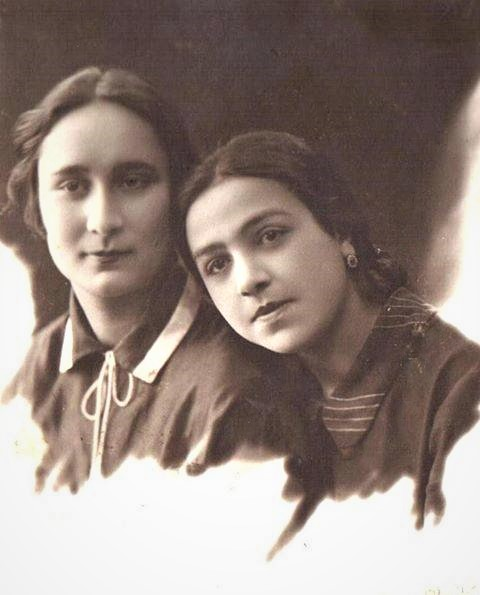
Editors of the magazine: Gulara Gadirbeyova (left) and Pari Gasanova (right), 1935

In the 1930s, the magazine shifted its focus to advocate for industrialization and cooperation, dedicating special attention to topics such as labor activism, and the establishment of collectives and state farms. During the period of Stalinist repressions period, many contributors and journalists of the "Sharg gadini” magazine were imprisoned, leading to turmoil within the publication. Gulara Koylugizi, who was the chief-editor of the magazine between 1931 and 1937, was also arrested and exiled as a result of repression, and this position was temporarily filled by Zehra Karimova, Barat Karimova, and Zuleykha Aliyeva during the years 1937–1940.

In the 1930s, Soviet leaders' new policy was merging gender and ethnicity and erasing distinctions between European and Azerbaijani women. Instead of categorizing local women solely by their cultural or religious background, officials began promoting Azerbaijani women as essential participants in nation-building. This transformation culminated in 1938 with the renaming of the magazine "Sharg gadini" to "Azerbaijan gadini". In February 1938, the magazine's name was changed to "Azerbaijan gadini" (Azerbaijani Woman), and it became the monthly public-political and literary-artistic magazine of the Central Committee of the Communist Party of Azerbaijan.

=== World War II and aftermath ===
The magazine was temporarily suspended from July 1940 to March 1951, because of the World War II. In March 1951, the magazine resumed publication and highlighted the achievements of women in various fields such as science, culture, art, education, entrepreneurship, and social issues. Furthermore, it brought attention to the enhancement of women's domestic conditions.

From 1965 to 1972, the magazine was led by Shafiga Aghayeva, while from 1972 to 1996, the writer Khalide Hasilova took over the helm. During this period, the magazine's circulation exceeded 320 000 copies, and Mirvari Dilbazi, Habiba Faxri, Alaviyya Babayeva, Sabir Ganjali, and others actively participated in the work of the magazine. Until 1973, a total of 575 issues of the magazine were published.

In 1973, the 50th anniversary of the magazine was celebrated at the state level. Valentina Tereshkova, the world's first female cosmonaut, also participated in the anniversary ceremony.

=== After the collapse of the Soviet Union ===
The economic challenges of the 1990s led to a decrease in the magazine's circulation to 5,000 in 1992, and it began to be published bi-monthly. In 1994, the total number of issues released was only 4, and in 1995–96, the magazine managed to publish just two issues. In those years Khalida Hasilova was the editor of the magazine, and after she died in 1996 the publication was temporarily suspended. In April 1997, the magazine resumed publication under the editorship of Fatma Abdullazadeh as editor-in-chief and Flora Xalilzadeh as editor.

=== Modern days ===
Starting from 2009, "Azerbaijan gadini" began to appear in a new printing format and layout. Currently, the magazine is published under the editorship of Fatma Abdullazadeh. The magazine features topics about various projects that play an important role in the country's public life, events contributing to the development of science and culture, as well as interviews of modern Azerbaijani individuals who are constantly in the spotlight due to their activities and creativity. It is now published four times a year - in summer, autumn, winter, and spring - with each issue having a circulation of 5000 copies in Azerbaijani and Russian languages.

== Print detailes ==
The "Sharg gadini" magazine was printed at the Red East Press in A4 size (210 x 297 mm). The magazine was printed in black and white from 1923 to 1925, then switched to color printing in 1925.

In 1926, the Azeri Soviet government initiated a campaign against religious figures, advocating for the closure of religious educational centers and the abolition of the Arabic alphabet. Sharg gadini and the republican central newspaper Kommunist were the first newsprints that changed their script from Arabic to Latin, beginning this process in 1926 and completely shifting to Latin in 1928. The Azerbaijani political elite, largely composed of former Imperial and ADR figures, chose Latin over Cyrillic script to distance themselves from the Tsarist past and align with modernist ideals.

Between 1923 and 1926, the magazine's cover featured an oriental woman gazing dreamily at the rising sun under a prominent red star and sickle, symbolizing Communism. From 1926 onwards, the cover became simpler, displaying only the title and issue number, reflecting the official tone of articles dedicated to Communist cultural ambitions. In 1928, as Azerbaijan SSR initiated rapid universal unveiling, each issue's cover depicted modern Azerbaijani women casting off their veils. By the late 1920s, covers showcased joyful Azerbaijani female workers, pilots, engineers, athletes, and students, highlighting the Communist Party's liberation of Muslim women as equals in building the socialist state alongside men.

== Missions and impacts ==
The launch of the "Sharg gadini" magazine was a significant event in the history of the women's movement in Azerbaijan. The magazine promoted ideas of freedom and equality for women, and covered topics related to education and culture. The magazine played a crucial role in advocating for women's rights and societal change. With a Marxist-Leninist perspective, it addressed political, social, economic, and cultural issues impacting women, nurturing a generation of writers and poets. Since its beginning, Sharg gadini supported Soviet-style freedom for all Muslim women, no matter where they stood in society. The magazine pointed out differences among Azerbaijani women, like literacy and where they lived, rather than focusing on rich or poor. Writers in the magazine were passionate about fighting against old-fashioned ideas and Islamic traditions against to women's freedom. Unlike the Russian magazine Kommunistka, Sharg gadini saw a difference between old beliefs and religion, saying education was important for women within the Soviet system. While Kommunistka was against all religion, Sharg gadini only criticized religious leaders who stopped women from being free.

"Sharg gadini" was not only read in Azerbaijan, but also in Uzbekistan, Turkmenistan, Tajikistan, Georgia, Tatarstan, Dagestan, Iran, Turkey, Afghanistan, India, and other countries. The magazine had a great influence on the publication of women's magazines in Uzbekistan and Tatarstan and The First Turkological Congress held in Baku had an exceptional impact on this process. The influence of the "Shag gadini" magazine led to the establishment of the "Seodat" magazine for Uzbek women on December 1, 1925. Published eight times a year, "Seodat" provided articles and information on literature, culture, art, science, education, and sports, encouraging women to pursue knowledge.

The magazine also played a significant role in society by featuring the initial articles of women and girls interested in various fields like science, culture, arts, and medicine. Alongside Azerbaijan's pioneering female writers and journalists, it frequently published stories and poems of notable literary figures of Azerbaijan, such as J. Mammadguluzadeh, S. S. Akhundov, A. Shaig, S. Huseyni, Y. V. Chamanzaminli, T. Shahbazi, H. Javid, and other writers. In 1923, the magazine had 11 contributors, in 1930, there were 188, and in 1933, there were 242 contributors.

== Legacy ==
Today, the issues of "Azerbaijan gadini" which published from 1923 to 1938, are preserved with care and held in the collection of the Azerbaijan National Library. On December 21, 2013, the 90th anniversary of the magazine was celebrated at the International Mugham Center of Azerbaijan.
