= Gulara Gadirbeyova =

Azerbaijani women's rights activist and politician

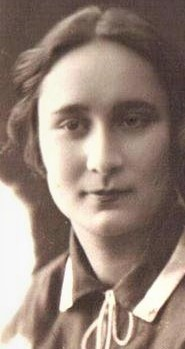
- Born: 1903; Baş Göynük, Nukha District, Russian Empire
- Died: 1942 (aged 38–39); Siberia, USSR
- Other names: Gulara Koylugizi
- Occupation(s): journalist, educator, politician

Gulara Ibrahimkhalil gizi Gadirbeyova (née Afandiyeva; 1903 – 1942) was an Azerbaijani women's rights activist and politician (Communist). She was engaged in pedagogy and also in journalism, being the author of several articles in various publications. She became the editor-in-chief of the first women's magazine in Azerbaijan, "Sharg gadini" (1923–1937). Gulara Gadirbeyova was also the chairperson of the Ali Bayramov Club, the organization of the Azerbaijani women's movement, in 1930–1937.

She was accused of being a member of a revolutionary organization during the Stalinist repressions, imprisoned, and later exiled to Siberia. There is no precise information about her later life and death.

== Biography ==
=== Early years ===
Gulara Gadirbeyova was born in 1903 in the village of Bash Goynuk, Nukha district (present-day Shaki district). In the materials, it is highlighted that her family was one of the rich and respected families in the district, and her father is noted to have worked as a landowner in the past. It is indicated that later her father was killed by the local nobility of Goynuk. In 1920, Gulara enrolled in pedagogical courses opened in Shaki, completing her studies and obtaining the right to teach. She began teaching girls in the village and also became involved in public affairs.

=== Career ===
At the age of 20, Gulara was appointed as the director of the Women's Department in the district. From this period onwards, she became one of the pioneers of the women's liberation movement in Azerbaijan. In 1923, Qadirbeyova joined the Azerbaijan Communist Party and worked at the Sheki District Party Committee.

She frequently appeared in the press to promote the idea of women's liberation in society. During her years of work in the districts, she contributed to publications such as "Yeni fikir" (New Idea), "Kandli qazeti" (Village Newspaper), and other publications. In 1923, when the "Sharg gadini" magazine was published, 20-year-old Gulara became one of its first female correspondents, gaining fame with her articles. In May 1931, Qadirbeyova was appointed as the editor of the "Sharg gadini" magazine. She wrote her articles under the pseudonym "Koylu gizi" (Village Girl). From 1932 to 1937, she served as the director of the Ali Bayramov Women's Club.

Later, she led the Women's Department in Shamkir (then called Shamkhor) and Quba. In 1927, she was appointed as the director of the Women's Department of the Azerbaijan Central Executive Committee. She also held the position of the head of the Department for Mass Cultural and Educational Affairs at the Azerbaijan People's Commissariat of Education for a while. In the January 7, 1936, an article about Gulara Gadibeyova was published in the "Pravda", the leading newspaper of the USSR.

=== Arrest and exile ===
During the Stalinist repression period, Gadirbayova's activities were interpreted as nationalist and anti-soviet propaganda. One of the initial reasons for this was the publication of the book "The History of a Palace," edited by Gadirbeyova, on the occasion of the 15th anniversary of the Ali Bayramov Club in 1936. The book was heavily criticized as a work written in a nationalist view and quickly drew the attention of higher authorities. Additionally, Gadirbayova's friendships with Azerbaijani nationalists such as Huseyn Javid, Ahmad Javad, and Seyid Hussein were cited as reasons, and she was accused of being an "active member of a subversive organization."

In 1937, Hamid Sultanov and Mirza Mammad Gasimov, testified as members of a subversive organization and mentioned that Gulare Gadirbayova was also a member of this organization in their testimonies. Mirza Mammad Gasimov stated in his testimony that Qadirbayova herself claimed to be a member of the subversive organization and was recruited into it by Ibrahim Tagiyev. Meanwhile, Hamid Sultanov mentioned in his testimony that Qadirbayova was a member of the organization and was recruited into it by Mirza Mammad Gasimov. Another reason for Gadirbayova's accountability is cited as the petitions written by Bilgeis Hashimzadeh to Mir Jafar Bagirov on February 25 and July 17, 1937. In this documents, she noted that Gadirbayova had connections with nationalist writers Ahmad Javad and Huseyn Javid, who were already in custody at that time, as well as with Tamara Salikova, Senuber Ayubova, Khaver Karayeva, and Khadidja Huseynova.

On July 23, 1938, an order numbered L-956 was issued for the arrest of Gulara Garibeyova. She was arrested on July 26 while attending her mother's funeral in the village of Basqal, Ismayilli District. On July 27, an arrest warrant was issued against her, while she was already arrested.

In November 1938, Bilgeis Hashimzade was questioned as a witness regarding the case involving Gadirbeyova. In her testimony, she provided detailed information about the convicted individual. She mentioned that Karim Gaziyev, Gulare's brother, was imprisoned and exiled for his revolutionary activities as an active member of the "Musavat" party. Additionally, she emphasized that the book "The History of A Palace," published under Gadirbeyova's editorship, was written in the spirit of Musavat ideology.

In 1938, Gadirbeyova was interrogated four times – on August 15, October 31, November 15, and November 21 – and she denied all the allegations against her during each interrogation. On January 20, 1939, a protocol was drafted concerning the conclusion of the investigation into the case involving Gulara Gadirbeyova. She was accused under Articles 72 and 73 of the Criminal Code of the Azerbaijan SSR. The allegations against her were endorsed by the Special Advisory Council under the Commissioner of Internal Affairs of the USSR in February of that year. On June 9, a decision was made to send Gulara Gadirbeyova to a detention facility for a five-year term.

=== Afterlife and death ===
There is no information available about Gadirbeyova's later life. According to some sources, she died in 1942 during an unsuccessful operation while in exile. According to Tehran Shamseddinskaya, who claims to have been in the same camp together with Gulara Gadirbeyova, it was believed that Gadirbeyova suffered from appendicitis, and she had undergone two surgical operations. According to her, Gadirbeyova died on December 29, 1942, at the hospital of the Tomskaya railway station, after a third surgical operation in the absence of professional doctors, nurses, and proper medical supplies.

In October 1950, in a report written to Deputy Minister Colonel Karimov, it was stated that the prisoner Gadirbeyova disappeared in May 1942 and she should be re-imprisoned based on the decision of the DTK and SSR Prosecutor's Office dated October 28, 1948. Karimov also reported that Garibova had disappeared after his prison term ended and should be searched for and re-imprisoned.

On September 13, 1957, the representative of the Azerbaijan SSR, Ismayılov, filed an appeal regarding Gadirbeyova's case, urging for the annulment of the 1939 Special Council's decision due to the lack of criminal evidence. Subsequently, on October 10, the Criminal Collegium of the Azerbaijan SSR Supreme Court granted the request, leading to her exoneration.

=== Personal life ===
Gulara Gadirbeyova married Ahmad Gadirbeyov but later separated, although she retained his surname. Her second husband, Asef Rahmanov, worked in security services for a long time and was imprisoned during the repression era, ultimately being shot on January 3, 1938. Gadirbeyova's brother, Karim Gaziyev, was exiled as an active member of the "Musavat" party.

== Legacy ==
The school in the village of Baş Göynük and a street in the Nərimanov raion of Baku are named after Gulara Gadirbeyova.
