= List of newspapers in Azerbaijan =

There are 3500 newspapers being published in Azerbaijan. With the vast majority of them are published in Azerbaijani. The remaining 130 are published in Russian (70), English (50) and various other languages (Turkish, French, German, Arabic, Persian, Armenian, etc.).

Azerbaijani newspapers can be split into more serious-minded newspapers, usually referred to as broadsheets due to their large size, and sometimes known collectively as "the quality press".

Below is a list of newspapers published in Azerbaijan.

== Newspapers ==
=== Daily newspapers ===
Title	Published	Format	Est.	Owner	Language	Orientation	Political party support in 2013 Presidential election
AzeriTimes.com	Daily	Broadsheet	2008	Ziya Ibrahim	English	Independent, Left-center	
Crime and Criminal	Daily	Broadsheet	2016	Aqil Yusifov	Azerbaijani	New Azerbaijan Party	
Adalat	Daily	Broadsheet	1990	Agil Abbas	Azerbaijani	Right-center	New Azerbaijan Party
Azadliq	Daily	Broadsheet	1989	Ganimat Zahid	Azerbaijani	Left-wing	National Council of Democratic Forces
Azerbaycan	Daily	Berliner	1918	Government of Azerbaijan	Azerbaijani	Right-wing	New Azerbaijan Party
Bakinskiy Rabochiy	Daily	Broadsheet	1906	Agabak Asgarov	Russian	Right-center	New Azerbaijan Party
Bizim Yol	Daily	Broadsheet	2000	Bahaddin Gaziyev	Azerbaijani	Left-center	
Echo	Daily	Broadsheet	2001	Rauf Talishinsky	Russian	Liberal	
Ekspress	Daily	Broadsheet	1995	Mushfig Safiyev	Azerbaijani	Left-center	
Kaspi	Daily	Broadsheet	1999	Intellekt	Azerbaijani	Right-center	
Khalg Gazeti	Daily	Broadsheet	1919	Mahal Ismayilogly	Azerbaijani	Right-wing	New Azerbaijan Party
Khalg Cebhesi Gazeti	Daily	Broadsheet	2001	Elchin Mirzabeyli	Azerbaijani	Left-wing	National Council of Democratic Forces
Respublika	Daily	Broadsheet	1990	Government of Azerbaijan	Azerbaijani	Right-wing, populist	New Azerbaijan Party
Sherg	Daily	Broadsheet	1996	Akif Ashirli	Azerbaijani	Right-wing	
Tezadlar	Daily	Broadsheet	1993	Asif Marzili	Azerbaijani	Right-wing	
Üç nöqta	Daily	Broadsheet	1998	Khoshgadam Hidayatgizy	Azerbaijani	Right-wing	
Yeni Musavat	Daily	Broadsheet	1989	Rauf Arifoglu	Azerbaijani	Left-wing, populist	National Council of Democratic Forces
Zaman	Daily	Broadsheet	1991	Fetullah Gulen	Azerbaijani	Left-center	

=== Non-daily newspapers ===
Title	Published	Format	Est.	Owner	Language	Orientation	Political party support in 2013 Presidential election
Azernews	Sunday	Berliner	1997	Fazil Abbasov	English	Centre-right	New Azerbaijan Party
Nedelya Jivaya Gazeta	Sunday	Berliner	1997	Unknown	Russian	Centre-right	New Azerbaijan Party

== Local newspapers in Azerbaijan ==
- Lankaran
  - Lankaran
- Nakhchivan
  - Sharg Gapisi
- Shaki
  - Shaki
  - Shakinin Sasi
- Sumgayit
  - 365 Gün

== Specialist newspapers ==
=== Sport ===
- Futbol+ – daily newspaper summarising the day's football news

=== Miscellaneous special interest ===
- Ədəbiyyat qəzeti – monthly literary newspaper
- Qoroskop – monthly newspaper aimed at horoscope followers
- Tumurcuq – monthly newspaper for children

== Freesheet newspapers in urban centres ==
- Birja – weekly free newspaper of classified advertising

== Defunct newspapers ==
- Akinchi (1875–1877) - weekly
- Bauer und Arbeiter (1924) - weekly
- Çeşmə (1991–1995)- daily.
- Dövran (1997–2000) - weekly.
- Gündəlik Azərbaycan (2005–2007) - daily.
- Istiglal (1932–1934) - weekly
- Komanda (2008–2014) - daily newspaper summarising football news
- Lenins Weg (1932–1936) - weekly
- Müxalifət (1991–2007) - daily
- Zerkalo (1990–2014) - daily
