= Pirabadil History Museum =

Museum in Shabran District, Azerbaijan

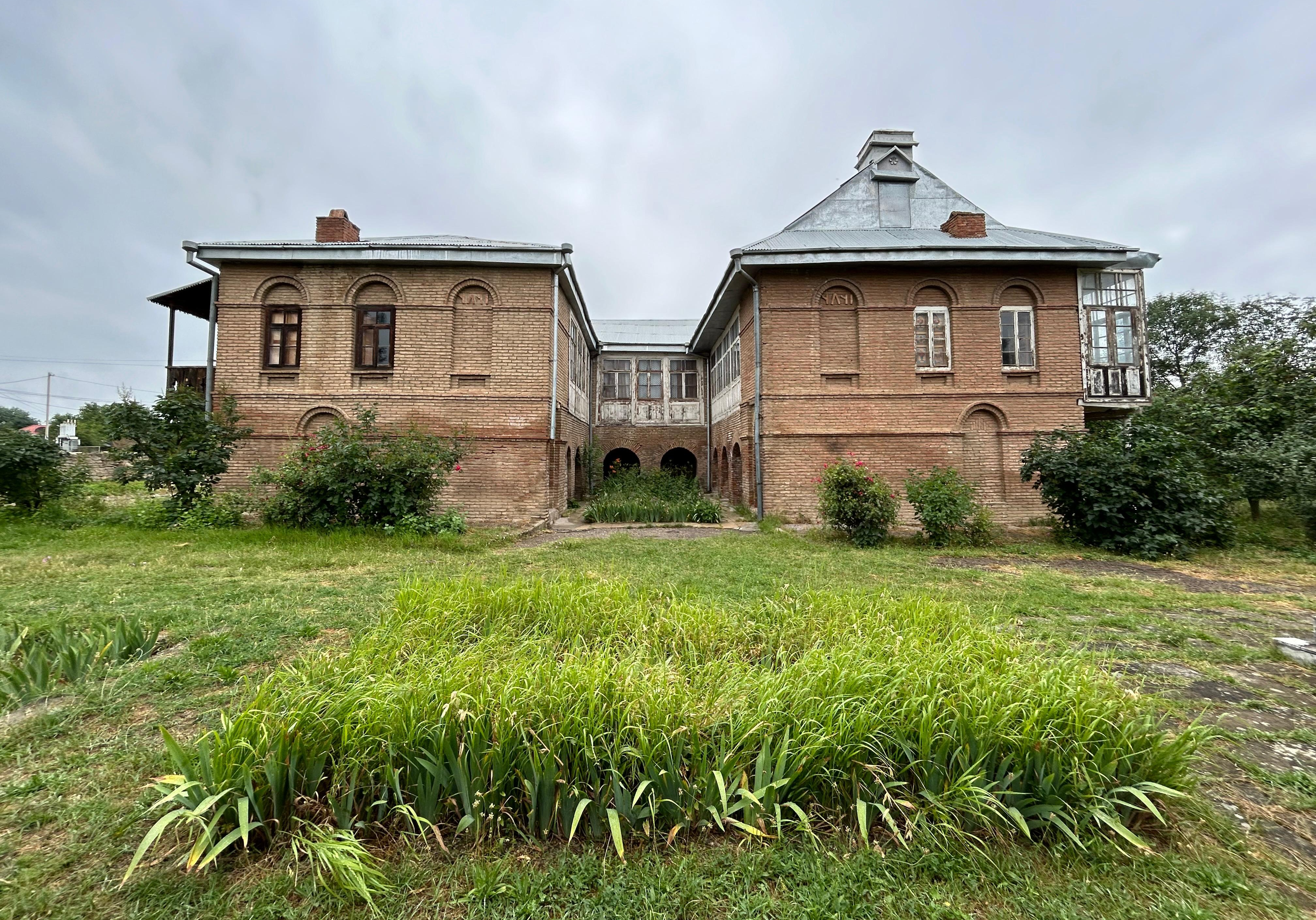
- Established: 1968
- Location: Pirabadil, Shabran District, Azerbaijan
- Type: History
- Collection size: 2,451
- Director: Parvana Mirzeyeva

Pirabadil History Museum (Azerbaijani: Pirəbədil Tarix Muzeyi) is a museum located in the village of Pirabadil, Shabran District, Azerbaijan. The museum is housed in the mansion of Mahmudagha bey Musabekov, built in 1862. The building has been used as a museum since 1968.

== About ==
The mansion housing the museum was built in 1862 in the village of Pirabadil by order of Mahmudagha bey Musabekov, the father of Gazanfar Musabekov and Ayna Sultanova. Constructed of baked brick, the mansion has two storeys and consists of 14 rooms, a veranda, and an oriel. In 1903, oil paintings were applied to the walls and ceiling of the main hall.

In 1968, on the occasion of the 80th anniversary of Gazanfar Musabekov, a house museum dedicated to him was opened in the mansion. A bust of Musabayov was installed in front of the museum building. The museum initially operated in two rooms of the mansion. In 1988, for the 100th anniversary of Gazanfar Musabekov, the entire mansion was renovated and fully allocated to the museum.

Since 2013, the museum has been renamed and has been operating under the title "Pirabadil History Museum."

== Exhibits ==
The museum’s collection consists of 2,451 exhibits displayed across 749 expositions. The museum features halls dedicated to the history of the village of Pirabadil, agriculture, education of the local population, the "Pirabadil" carpet, and the Musabekov family.

=== Interesting fact ===
The "Pirabadil" carpet design woven by Dibakhanim Musabekova, the wife of Mahmudagha bey Musabekov, in the mansion where the museum is located, won first place and received a gold medal at the "Carpet Symposium" held in Saint Petersburg in 1912. Dibakhanim khanum and Mahmudagha bey’s nieces, Gullar Afandiyeva and Munavvar Afandiyeva, who also took part in weaving the carpet, were each awarded a prize of 1,000 manats.

== Pictures ==
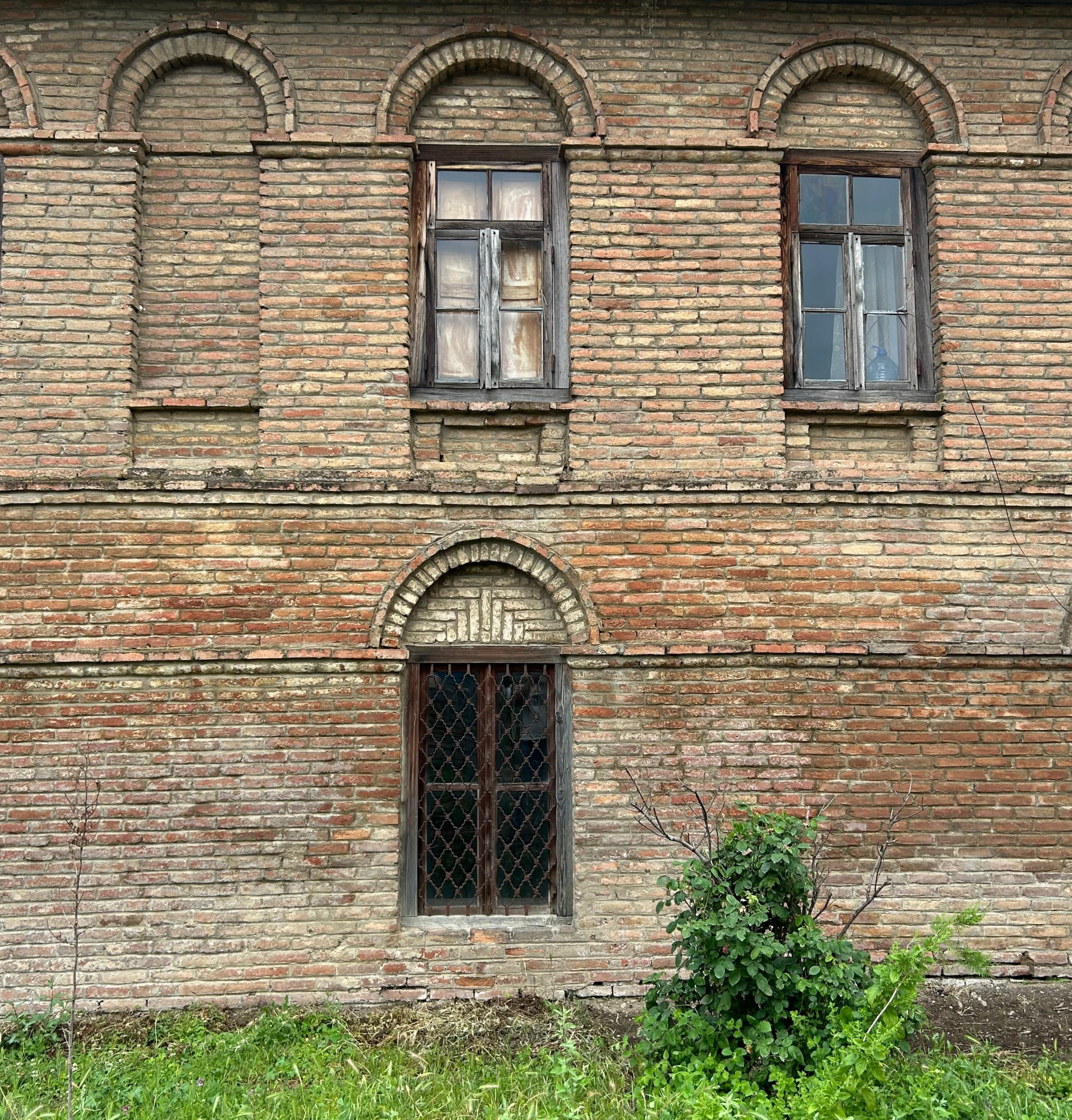

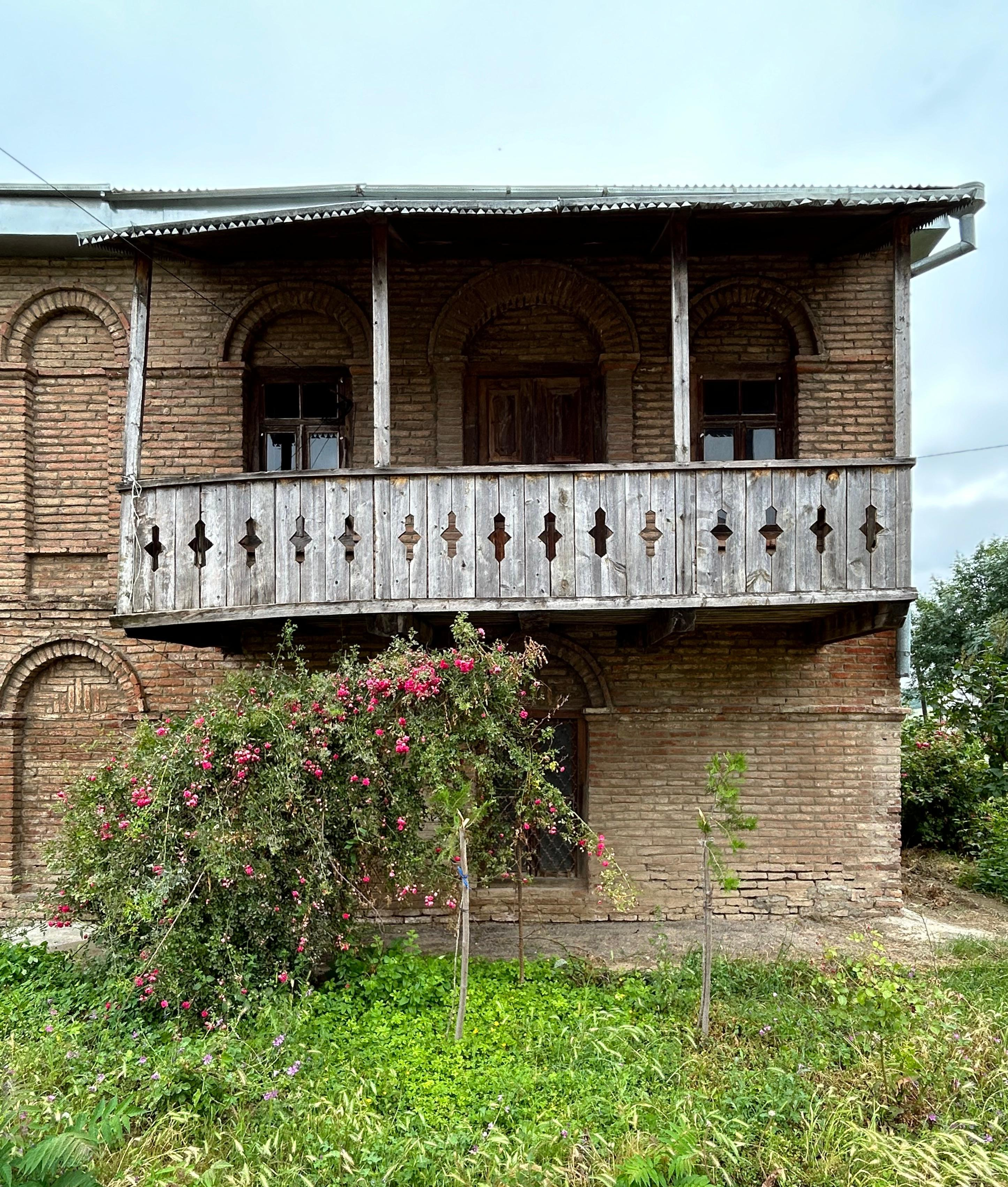

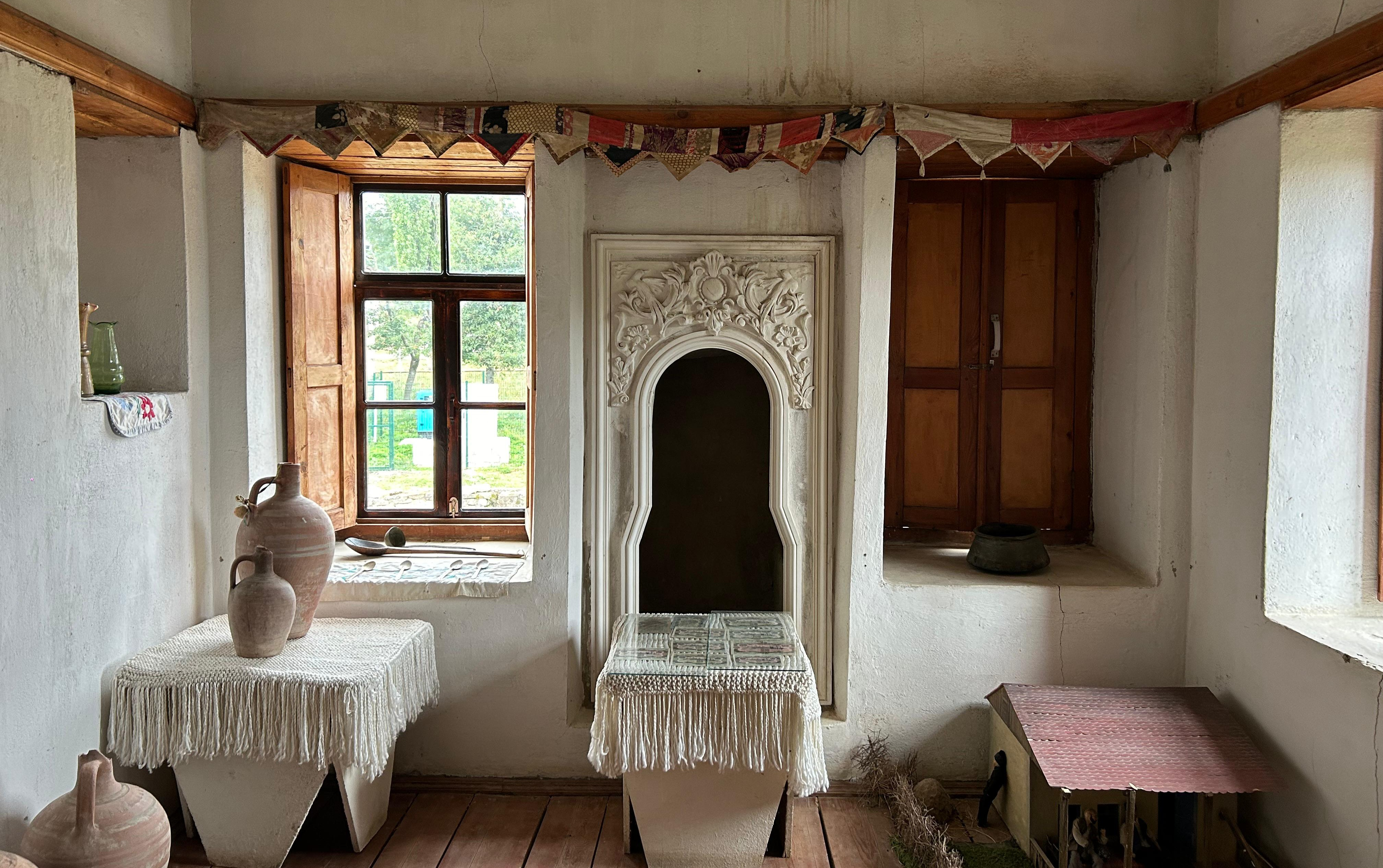

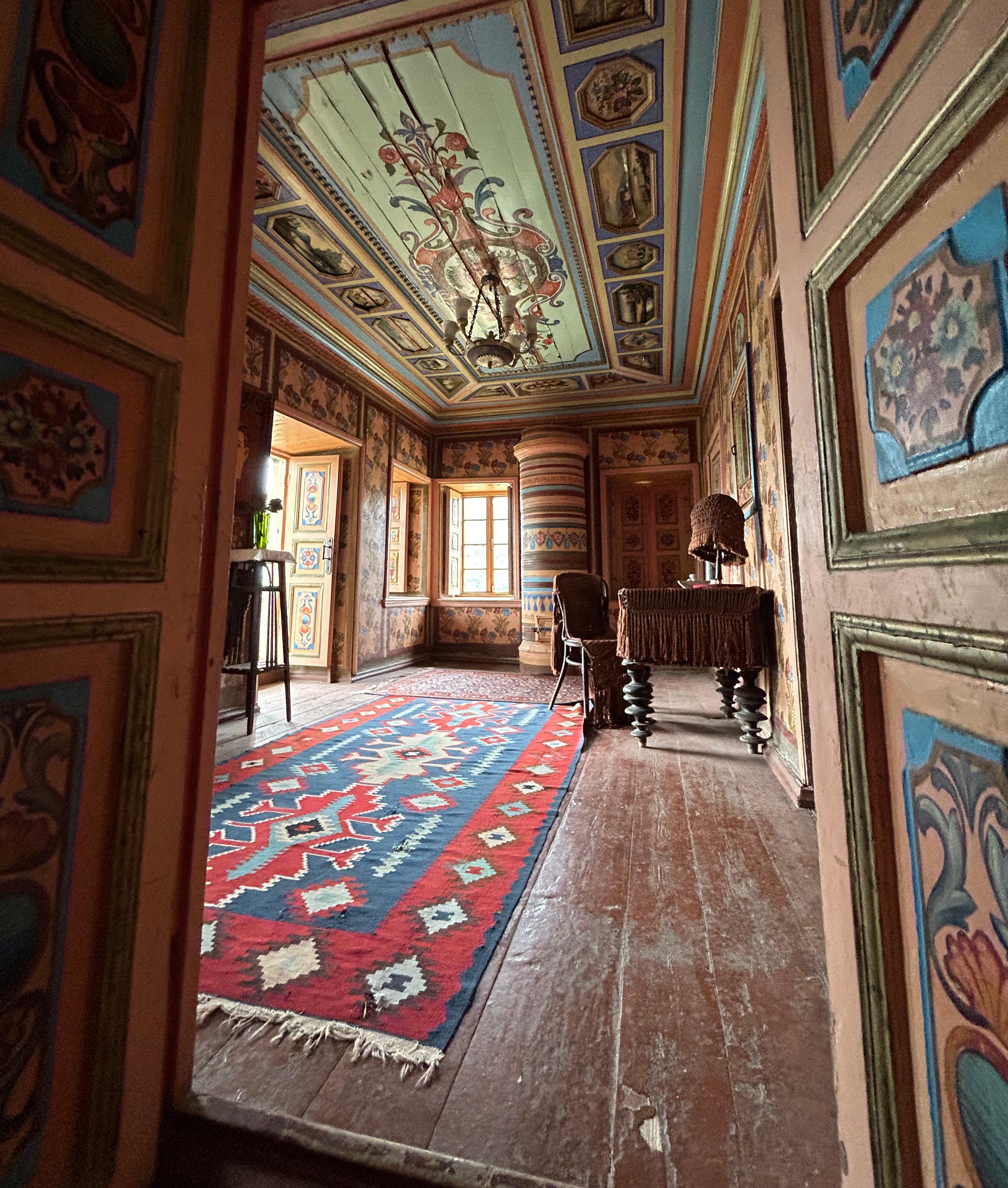

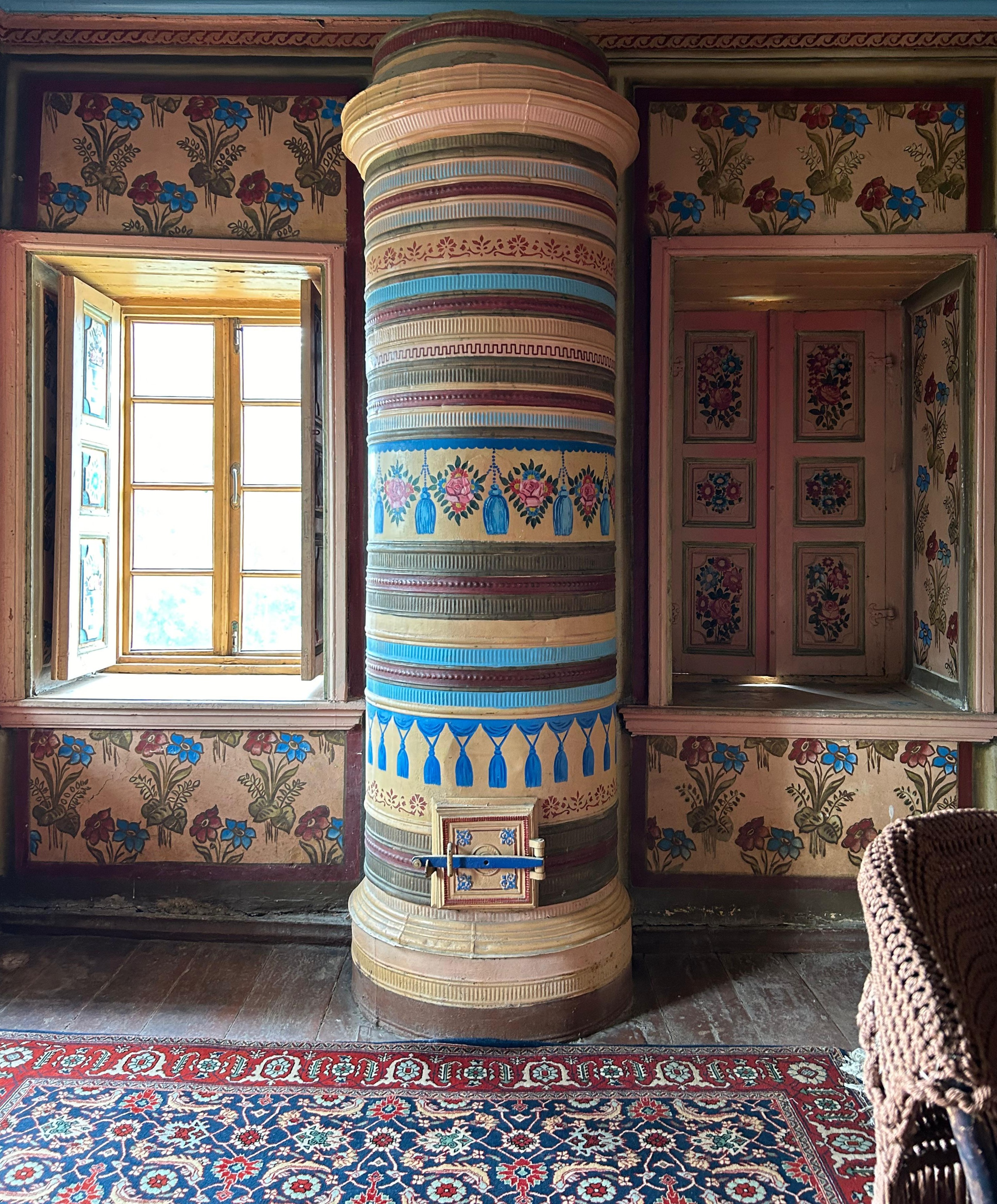

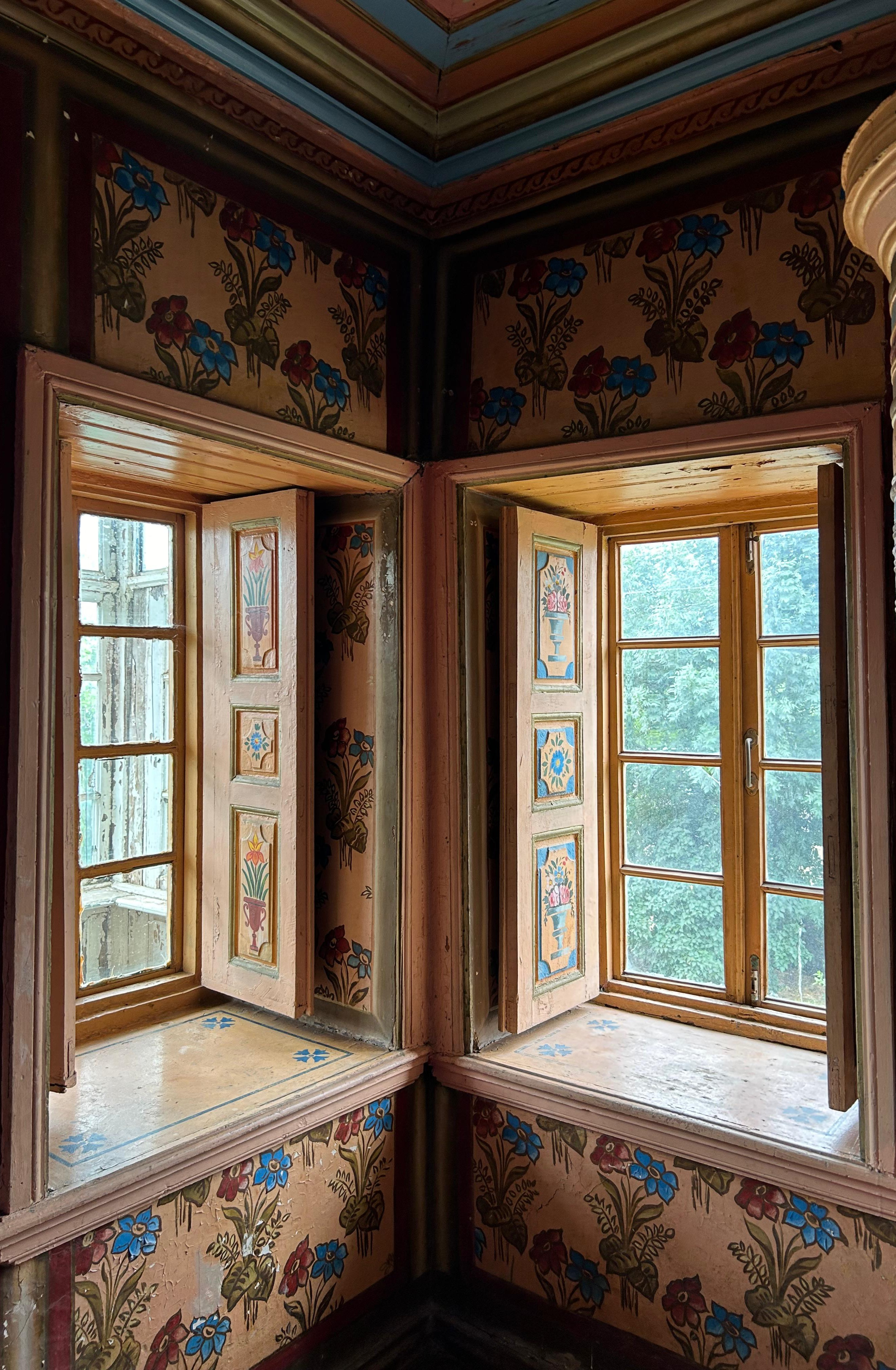

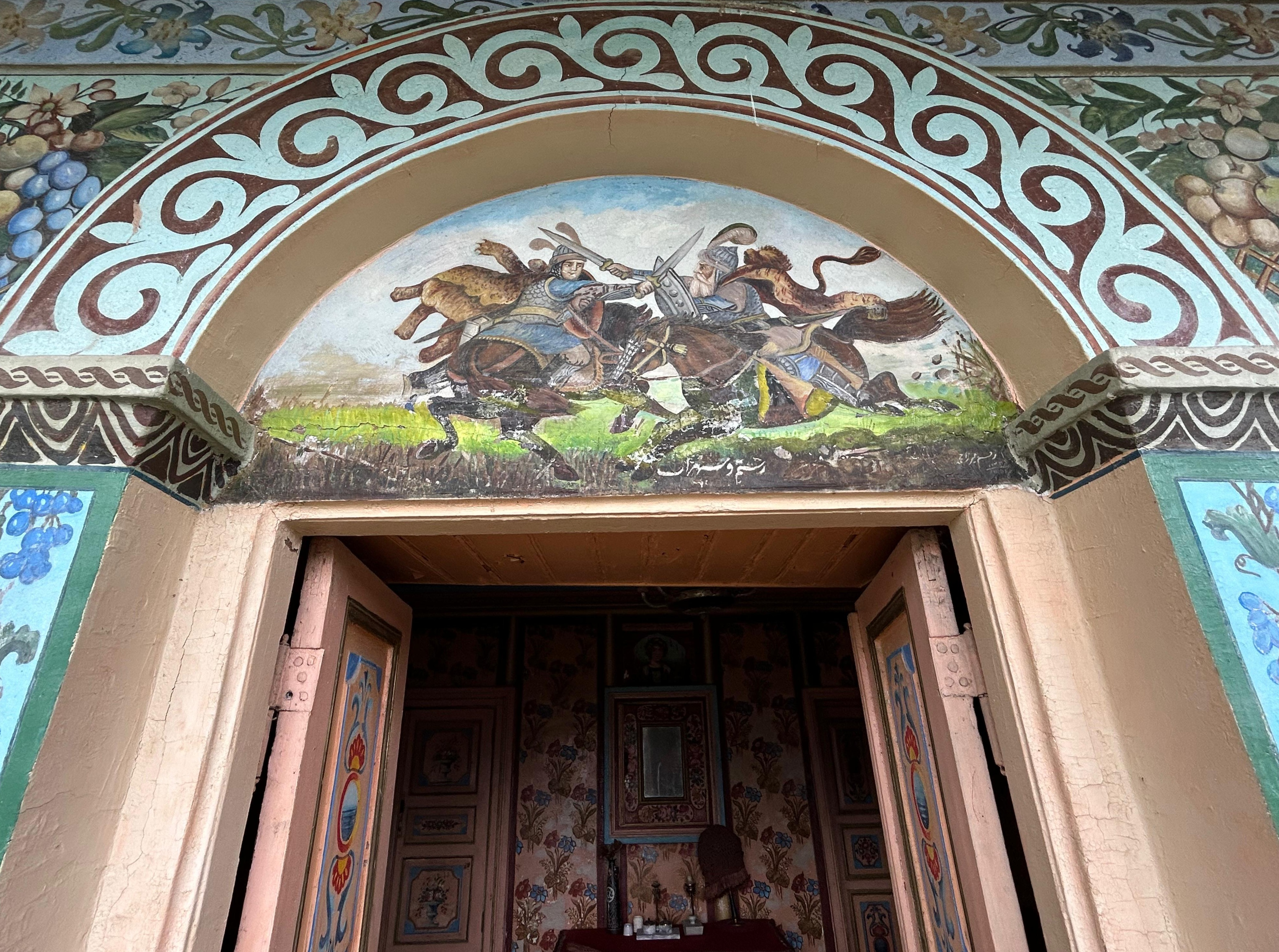

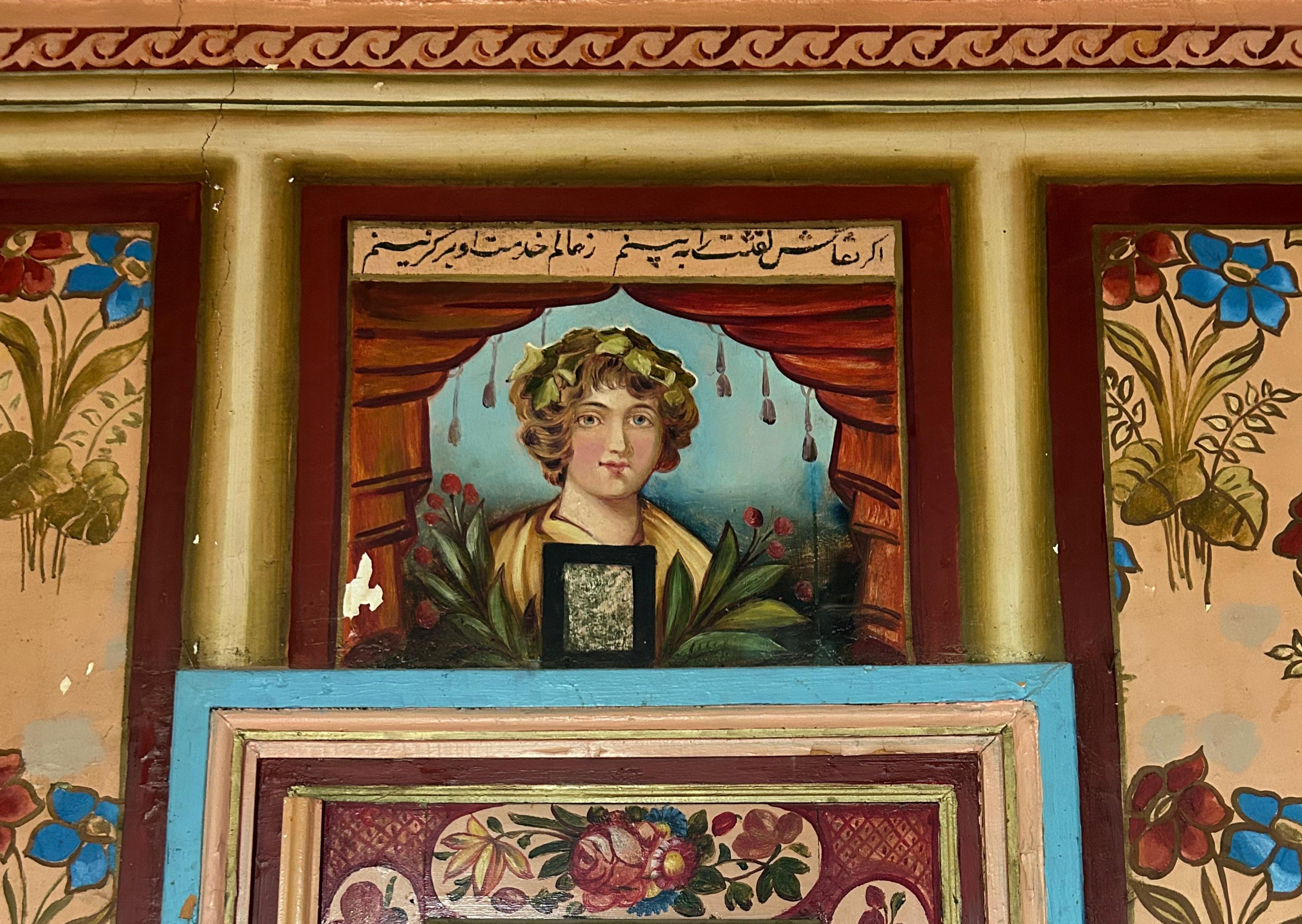

== Sources ==
- Bayramlı, Zakir (2014). Min ilə bərabər yüz il (PDF) (in Azerbaijani). Baku: Müəllim nəşriyyatı. p. 516.
