= Pirəbədil =

- Municipality
- Location within Azerbaijan
- Coordinates: 41°12′22″N 48°47′55″E
- Country: Azerbaijan
- Rayon: Davachi

Population
  - Total: 834
- Time zone: UTC+4 (AZT)
  - Summer (DST): UTC+5 (AZT)

Pirəbədil (also, Pirebedil’) is a village and municipality in the Davachi Rayon of Azerbaijan. It has a population of 834. The municipality consists of the villages of Pirəbədil, Sumağava, Sumağavaqazma, and Zöhramlı.

== Notable natives ==
- Ayna Sultanova — one of the first Azeri women revolutionaries, People's Commissar of Justice of the Azerbaijan SSR; its name is associated with appearance of the first in the East women's magazine "Shark Kadyny" ("Woman of the East"); sister of Gazanfar Musabekov and the wife of Hamid Sultanov.
- Gazanfar Musabekov — Chairman of the Council of People's Commissars of the Azerbaijan SSR (1922–1930), Chairman of the Council of People's Commissars ZSFSR (1932–1936), Chairman of the Central Executive Committee of Azerbaijan SSR.

== See also ==
- Pirabadil History Museum
