= Shafiga Efendizadeh =

Azerbaijani women's rights activist, educator and journalist

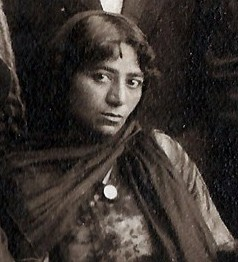
- Born: March 19, 1883; Atskuri, Akhaltsikhe uezd, Tiflis Governorate,
- Died: July 29, 1959 (aged 76); Baku, Azerbaijan SSR, USSR
- Occupations: journalist, writer, educator

Shafiga Efendizadeh (Azerbaijani: Şəfiqə Əfəndizadə; March 19, 1883 – July 29, 1959) was an Azerbaijani women's right activists, educator and journalist. She was the author of numerous articles on the defense of women's rights and freedoms in the various publications including the "Ishig" newspaper, the "Azerbaijan" newspaper and the "Sharg gadini" magazine. Efendizadeh actively participated in the organization of Ali Bayramov Club, the first club for women in Azerbaijan.

Shafiga Efendizadeh was the first Azerbaijani female journalist and publicist, and also the first teacher in the Transcaucasia to teach the Azerbaijani language. It is also said that she was the first female employee of the Azerbaijan Democratic Republic government.

== Early life and family ==
Shafiga Efendizadeh was born on March 19, 1883, in the village of Atskuri in the Akhaltsikhe uezd of the Tiflis Governorate, into the family of educator Hafiz Mahammademin Sheikhzadeh. She received her early education at home, alongside her younger sister. In 1896, her family moved to Nukha, where at the age of 14, Shafiga began teaching in a class established for girls by her father. Later, she took exams at the Religious Council of the Caucasus and at the III Aleksandrovski Men's Gymnasium in Baku, obtaining a certificate to teach Turkish language and Sharia law at elementary schools. In 1901, she obtained a teaching certificate at the Religious Council of the Caucasus in Tiflis, and from that year onwards, she began teaching the Azerbaijani language at the Empress Alexandra Russian Muslim Boarding School for Girls, founded by Haji Zeynalabdin Taghiyev. Later, she extensively studied Persian, Russian, and Arabic languages, as well as classical Eastern literature. Additionally, she taught classes at women's pedagogical school courses.

Shafiga was married to Aladdin Afandiyev, who was also a teacher. They had two sons: Adil (born in 1907) and Fuad (born in 1909). In 1918, during the March Days, Shafiga Efendizadeh and her family left Baku in late August, moved to Akhaltsikhe, and from there to Istanbul, Turkey. During the journey, she lost her husband and sister. Shafiga returned to Baku in April 1919.

== Career ==
Shafiga Efendizadeh began her journalistic career in 1903 with an article titled "Maarifpərvər rüf`ətli Məhəmməd Ağa Şaxtaxtinski hüzurialilərinə" published in the 7th issue of the "Shargi-Rus" newspaper. Throughout her career, she collaborated with publications where she also contributed her own literary works, such as "Debistan," "Mekteb," "Fuqara Fuyuzati," "Dirilik", "Medəniyyet" magazines, and also "Shargi-Rus," "Heyat," "Irshad," "Igbal," "Yeni Igbal" and "Achig soz," newspapers. In her articles, Shafiga Efendizadeh addressed significant events in the social and political life of the period, discussing issues such as women's rights and oppression, refugee problems, child education and upbringing, school life, and other important issues. In the bibliographic information book titled "Who Do You Need?" (Azerbaijani: Sizə kim lazımdır?) by Qulam Mammadli, it is noted that her articles were also published in "Sedayi-haqq", "Basiret", "Sovgat", and "Ittihad" newspapers. She also collaborated with the newspaper "Ishig" in 1911.

In 1906, Shafiga took part in the First Congress of Azerbaijani Teachersheld in Baku. Due to family circumstances, Shafiga Efendizadeh took a break from her work between 1907 and 1909. She resumed her career as an Azerbaijani language teacher at the I Russian-Tatar Women's School from 1909 to 1911, and from 1911 to 1918, she worked at the II Russian-Tatar Women's School in the same capacity. Efendizadeh and her friend Sakina Akhundzadeh, established a drama club, providing girls with information about theater culture and the art of acting, and introducing them to the press highlights of the time.

In 1914, the she published a book titled "Two Orphans, or Karim's Community" (Azerbaijani: "İki yetim, yaxud Kərimin hümməti"). Her stories like "A Conversation Between Two Girls," "Buying Candy," "First Love," "Dream," "What is a Teacher," and "Reward" (Note: Azerbaijani: "İki qızın söhbəti", "Şəkər alması", "İlk məhəbbət", "Röya", "Müəllim nədir", "Mükafat".) discuss aspects of children's lives and were published in the media of that period. Being proficient in Arabic, Persian, and Russian languages, Efendizadeh also translated some works and articles. It was Shafiga Efendizadeh who wrote the first review of Jalil Mammadguluzadeh's renowned work "The Corpses" in 1916. She had written an article about the play in the "Achig soz" newspaper.

In April 1917, a congress of Caucasian Muslims was held at the Ismailiyya building in Baku. Alongside individuals from various social strata, only three women participated: Sara Talıshinskaya, Shafiga Efendizadeh, and Sara Vazirova. Her speech sparked discussion because it was about the education of Eastern women, the opening of women's schools and theaters.

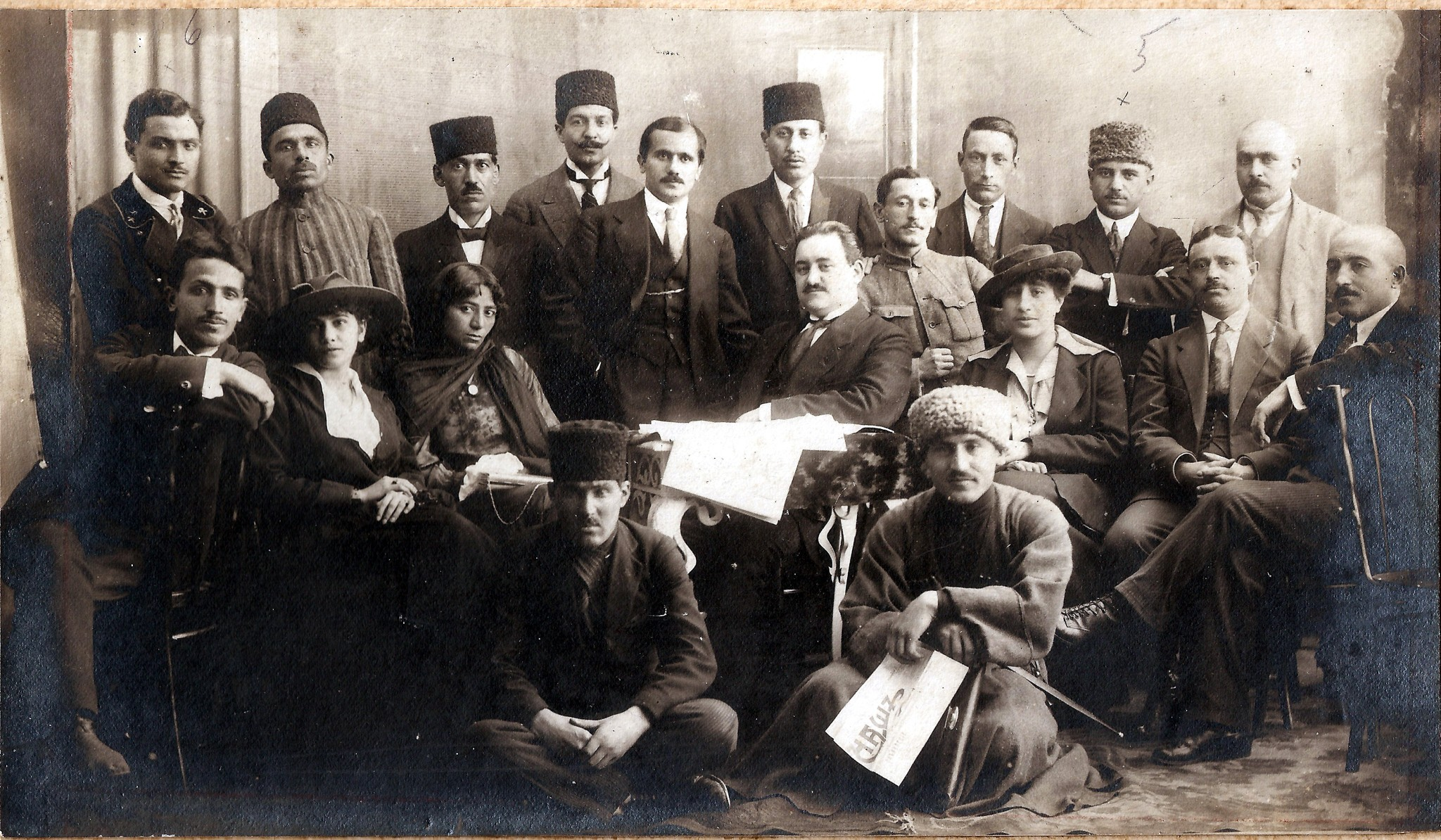
Editorial staff of the newspaper "Azerbaijan" (1919). Shafiga Efendizadeh is the third from the left in the second row

Upon her return from Istanbul in 1919, Shafiga Efendizadeh has been a member of the "Azerbaijan" newspaper's editorial board. Her article titled "Təşkilatın qadınlara təsiri" was featured in the 190th issue of the newspaper, dedicated to the anniversary of the Azerbaijan Democratic Republic (ADR). During that time, she participated in all the activities of the Republic's parliament, taking notes as a stenographer during the sessions. With the constitution adopted by the ADR Parliament on July 21, 1919, Azerbaijani women obtained the right to hold positions in the state administration for the first time. Six of the workers in the Parliament registry office were women and Shafiga Efendizadeh was appointed as the assistant director of the registry office.

During the years of Soviet rule, she actively participated in the organization of the Ali Bayramov Club in 1920, where she also taught in courses. She worked as a teacher at the Darülmüəllimat (a pedagogical school preparing female teaching staff) from 1920 to 1926. Alongside her teaching duties, she continued her work in publicist activities during these years. In 1923, she was selected as a member of the editorial board of the "Sharg gadini" magazine, serving as its editor and head of the literary department. Shafiga Efendizadeh was appointed as a member of the Central Executive Committee of Azerbaijan SSR in 1923.

Until 1932, she was actively engaged in pedagogical activities, representing at women's conferences and congresses held in the Caucasus, Moscow, and throughout Azerbaijan SSR. Among her students were notable figures such as Ayna Sultanova and Mirvarid Dilbazi.

== Death and legacy ==
Shafiga Efendizadeh died in the Baku on July 29, 1959. The 13th comprehensive school in Baku has been named after her.

Selected stories of Shafiga Efendizadeh, including "Two Orphans, or Karim's Community" and "The Doorman's Daughter," as well as excerpts from her "Memories" preserved at the Fuzuli Manuscripts Institute of the Azerbaijan National Academy of Sciences, have been compiled into a book titled "Selected Works of Shafiga Efendizadeh (1903–1925)." The book was published in 2017, on the occasion of the 135th anniversary of her birth. The compiler of her book is Doctor of Philosophy, Shahla Abdullayeva.
