= Sumağavaqazma =

- Location within Azerbaijan
- Coordinates: 41°11′20″N 48°49′15″E
- Country: Azerbaijan
- Rayon: Davachi
- Municipality: Pirəbədil
- Time zone: UTC+4 (AZT)
  - Summer (DST): UTC+5 (AZT)

Sumağavaqazma (also, Sumağava-Qazma and Sumagovakazma) is a village in the Davachi Rayon of Azerbaijan. The village forms part of the municipality of Pirəbədil.
