= Madina Qiyasbayli =

Azerbaijani educator and pedagogue

Madina khanum Qiyasbeyli
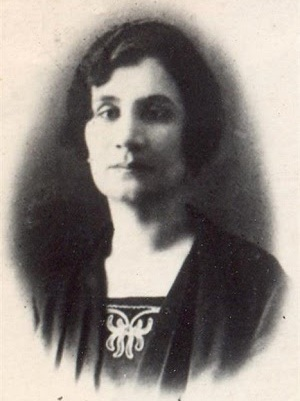
- Qiyasbayli in the 1920s
- Born: April 1889; Salahli, Elisabethpol Governorate, Russian Empire
- Died: 1938 (aged 48–49)
- Occupations: Journalist, educator

Madina Giyasbeyli (1889 – 1938) was an Azerbaijani educator, pedagogue, journalist and translator.

She played a pivotal role in establishing and leading several schools in Azerbaijan. She was also one of the founders of the "Sharg gadini" ("Eastern Woman") magazine.

She was arrested by the Extraordinary State Commission for the liquidation of counter-revolutionary and espionage activities (XDİK) on charges of being a member of the counter-revolutionary organization, the Azerbaijani Democratic Republic. She was detained 12 times within a short period. All of her property was confiscated. She was shot and killed on 28 September 1937.

== Life ==
Madina Vakilova was born in September 1889 in the village of Salahlı in the Gazakh district. She received her education at the "St. Nina Girls' School" in Tiflis. After completing her education there in 1904, she entered an additional course at a gymnasium. On 18 May 1905, she successfully completed her studies at the gymnasium.

In 1906, she opened the first one-class village girls' school in her house in the village of Salahli. In addition to Azerbaijani language, math, Russian language, natural science subjects, labor and singing lessons were also held here. Ahmed aga Gulmammadov taught the Azerbaijani language, natural sciences were taught by her father, Mehdi agha and the rest of subjects were taught by him. As the number of girls attending the school increased, it was officially recognized by the district education authorities on 15 October 1906. Madina Khanim was appointed as the director and teacher of the Salahlı girls' school.

In 1910, after getting married, she moved to the village of Dağ Kəsəmən. There, she opened a girls' school and continued her educational activities. Afterward, she and her husband relocated to Gədəbəy for a while, where she also worked as a teacher. In 1917, after her husband died, she worked in the Transcaucasian Commissariat in Tiflis. Following the dissolution of the Commissariat in 1918, she returned to Gazakh and was appointed as the inspector of public schools.

In 1919, she moved to Baku. In March 1920, she organized evening courses at her residence. On 10 March, these courses were officially recognized. Prominent figures such as Uzeyir Hajibeyli, Khadija Aghayeva, and Shafiga Efendizadeh also taught at her courses.

After the April occupation, on 20 December 1920, Madina Giyasbeyli was appointed as the head and teacher at Darulmuallimat, the first pedagogical institution in Azerbaijan dedicated to training elementary school teachers for girls. She played a key role in preparing elementary school teachers for girls. In 1926, she was relieved of her position and continued to work as a Russian language teacher at the institution. She was also one of the founders of the "Sharg gadini" ("Eastern Woman") journal and contributed to its articles.

She worked as a teacher in middle schools in Baku, as well as at the Agricultural Institute. Additionally, she held the position of assistant at the Azerbaijan State Medical Institute.

In November 1932, she fell from a tram in Azneft Square, sustaining severe injuries to her spine. In addition to teaching, she was also involved in translation work. She translated many poems and novels into the Russian language, including works by prominent Azerbaijani authors such as Samad Vurgun, Suleyman Rustam, Rasul Rza, Nigar Rafibeyli, and M.S. Ordubadi.

== Arrest ==
On 8 December 1936, she was arrested by the Extraordinary State Commission for the liquidation of counter-revolutionary and espionage activities (XDİK) based on Order No. 1747. She was charged with being a member of the "illegal counter-revolutionary Müsavat organization." From the date of her arrest until 8 September 1937, she was detained 12 times. In the indictment prepared on 23 September, she was accused of being a member of the Musavat Party, maintaining contact with the secret center of Musavat, gathering young people with revolutionary inclinations around her, and having connections with the Azerbaijani émigrés in Iran during 1930-1933. She was also accused of having connections with revolutionary-nationalist organizations' members such as Ruhulla Akhundov and Bakir Chobanzade. Based on these charges, she was found guilty under Articles 72 and 73 of the Criminal Code of the Azerbaijan SSR. According to a decision by the Special Trio of the Azerbaijan SSR Extraordinary State Commission dated 26 September 1937, it was decreed that the property of Madina Giyasbeyli, aged 45, be confiscated and she be executed. This decision was carried out on the night of 28 September 1937, at 01:25 AM. In 1956, after her death, Madina Giyasbeyli was posthumously acquitted by the Criminal Division of the Supreme Court of Azerbaijan on 24 August.

== Family ==
In 1909, she married Shehriyar Giyasbeyov. Shehriyar Giyasbeyov was born in 1890. He graduated from the Theological Seminary and worked as a teacher for some time. Later, he worked as a translator in the office of the head of the Gazakh district, Staff Captain Reutt. In 1917, he died due to a severe illness.

From this marriage, they had three children: Gulzar in 1911, Gulandam in 1914, and Mehdi in 1916.

== Memory ==
In 2019, the "Museum of Political Repression Victims" was opened in Baku, and a plaque dedicated to the women who were victims of repression, including Madina Giyasbeyli, was placed.

Photographs related to Madina Giyasbeyli are preserved in the National Museum of History of Azerbaijan.

On 17 December 2022, the premiere of the play "Code Name: 'V. X. A.'" or "Code Name: 'Traitors' Wives'" took place at the Azerbaijan State Theatre of Young Spectators. The play depicts the events that befell the wives of political prisoners during the Stalin-era repressions, as well as the women who suffered from repression. The play also portrays the arrest and detention of Madina Giyasbeyli.
