= Xaspolad =

Human settlement in Azerbaijan

Coordinates: 41°15′20″N 48°42′45″E

- Village
- Interactive map of Xaspolad
- Country: Azerbaijan
- Economic region: Guba-Khachmaz
- District: Quba
- Municipality: Zərqava

Population (2009)
  - Total: 367

Xaspolad is a village in the municipality of Zərqava in the Quba Rayon of Azerbaijan. As of the 2009 census, the village had a population of 367 people.
