= Sumağava =

- Location within Azerbaijan
- Coordinates: 41°11′57″N 48°49′03″E
- Country: Azerbaijan
- Rayon: Davachi
- Municipality: Pirəbədil
- Time zone: UTC+4 (AZT)
  - Summer (DST): UTC+5 (AZT)

Sumağava (also, Sumagova) is a village in the Davachi Rayon of Azerbaijan. The village forms part of the municipality of Pirəbədil.
