= Azerbaijan (newspaper) =

Newspaper published by the National Assembly of Azerbaijan

Azərbaycan
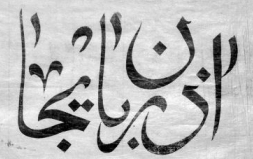

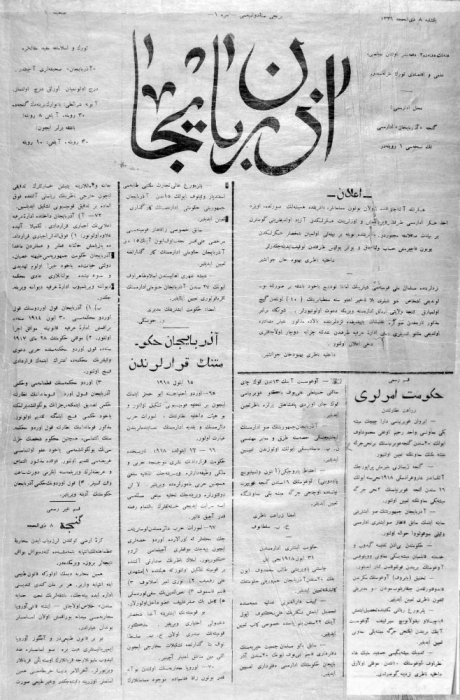
- The first issue of Azərbaycan
- Editor-in-chief: Jeyhun bey Hajibeyli (1918); Uzeyir bey Hajibeyli (1918-1920)
- Founded: 15 September 1918
- Ceased publication: 27 April 1920
- Language: Azerbaijani
- Headquarters: Baku, Azerbaijan

Azerbaijan (Azerbaijani: Azərbaycan) is a state-owned newspaper of Azerbaijan Democratic Republic.

== History ==
The official newspaper of the ADR government Azerbaijan was established in 1918. The government, by its order of 3 July 1918, decided on the launch of the publication the News of Azerbaijani Republic under its official authority. Thus, the first issue of the Azerbaijan newspaper was published as the parliamentary paper on 15 September 1918, on the same day, when the Caucasus Islamic Army freed Baku from the Armenian-Bolshevik invasion. One of the editors of the official government newspaper, the Azerbaijan, was Jeyhun Hajibeyli. The newspaper was published until 28 December 1919 with the signature of Uzeyir Hajibeyli's brother Jeyhun. There is no doubt about his great contribution to the publication of the newspaper. After the collapse of the Azerbaijan Democratic Republic, Jeyhun Hajibeyli, who was forced to leave the country and to immigrate to Europe, tried to issue the newspaper there and in 1951 he was able to achieve his goal in Munich (Germany).

== Editors ==
One of the editors-in-chief of the newspaper was Uzeyir Hajibayli. He wrote over 100 articles on politics, economics, culture and education, etc. for the Azerbaijan newspaper. The chief editor of the Russian version of the newspaper was Sefi Bek Rustambeyli. The newspaper was also written by Mammad Amin Resulzadeh, Khalil Ibrahim, Farhad Aghazadeh, Ibrahim Gasimov, Mukhamed aga Shahtakhtly, Adil Khan Ziyadkhanov, Alabbas Musnib, and Shafiga Efendizadeh.

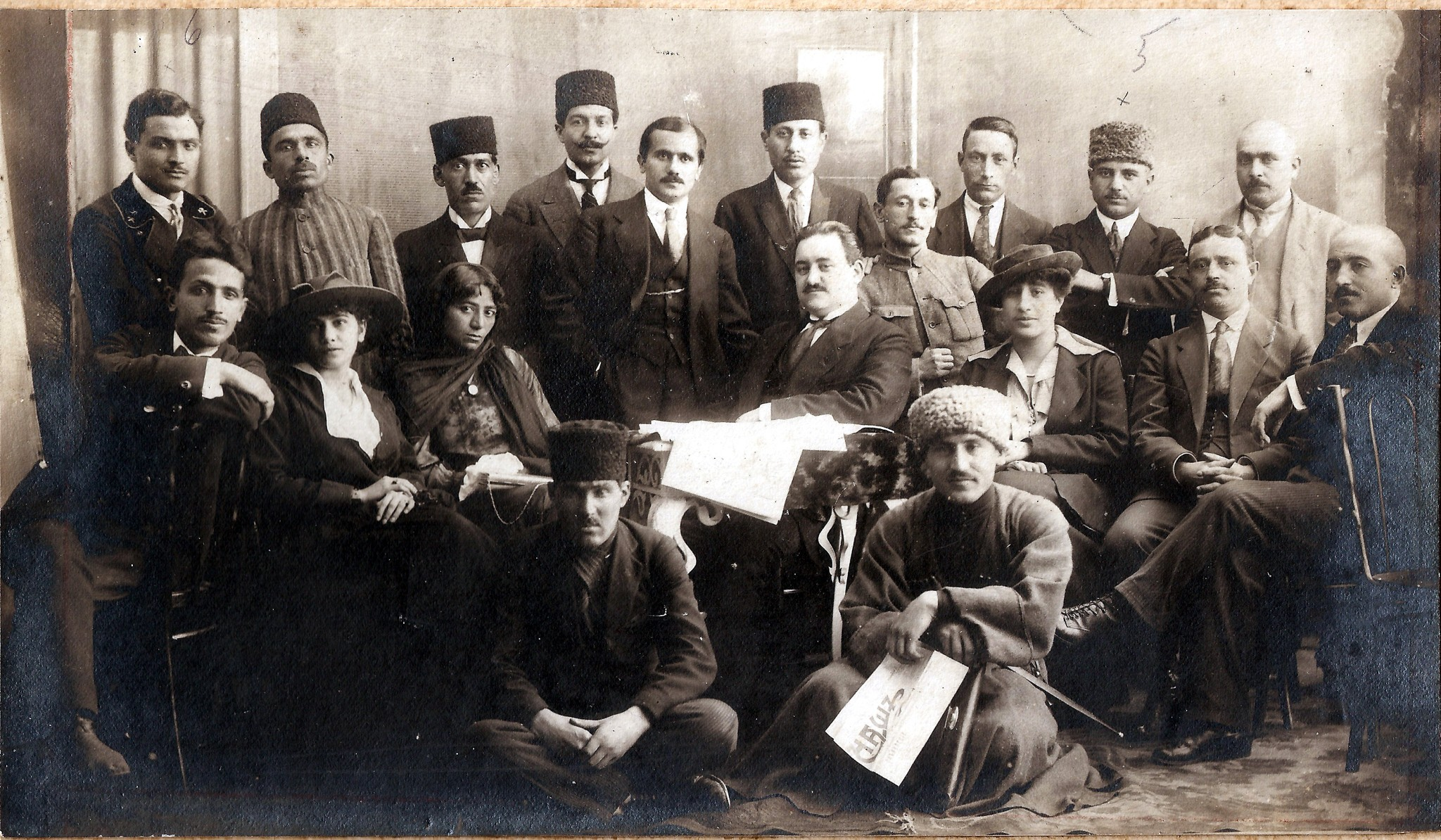
Editorial staff of the newspaper Azərbaycan (1919). Left to right, sitting in front: Piri Mursalzadeh, Rahim aga Vakilov. In the middle: Hanafi Zeynalli, Rubaba Taghizadeh, Shafiga Efendizadeh, Mammad Amin Rasulzadeh, Sahra Pashazadeh, Uzeyir bey Hajibeyov, Mustafa bey Vakilov. On the leg from left: Abdul Abdullazadeh, Mirza Hadi (Atlasov), Hajiibrahim Gasimov, Mammadali Sidgi Safarov, Shafi Bey Rustambeyov, Seyid Huseyn Sadig, Halil Ibrahimov, Gadir Heydarov, Ali Yusufzadeh, Muhammed Hadi Abdussalimzadeh.

== See also ==
- List of newspapers in Azerbaijan
