= Jeyran Bayramova =

Azerbaijani women's rights activist and politician

- Born: March 1896; Zərqava, Kuba uezd, Russian Empire
- Died: December 1987 (aged 91); Baku, Azerbaijan SSR, USSR
- Occupation: Politician
- Known for: Being founder of the "Ali Bayramov Club"
- Awards: Order of Lenin (twice), Order of the October Revolution

Jeyran Bayramova (March 1896 – December 1987) was an Azerbaijani women's rights activist and politician (Communist). She was a pioneer of the first organized women's movement of her country and the founder of the Ali Bayramov Club, the first organization of the Azerbaijani women's movement.

== Biography ==
=== Early life ===
Jeyran Bayramova was born in March 1896 in the Zərqəva village in Quba, into a poor family. When she was 15 years old, she started studying at the 3rd Russian-Tatar school in Baku. Bayramova entered the "Saint Nina" girl's gymnasium in 1918, but the director of the gymnasium expelled her for her affiliation with revolutionaries.

The revolutionary Ali Bayramov was married to Ceyran's sister, Masma. He lived in the same house as Ceyran's family and was the main instigator for Ceyran Bayramova's involvement in revolutionary activities. Masma died in 1916, and with her family's approval, Ceyran married Ali Bayramov. Their home was one of the places where revolutionaries gathered in Baku. Jeyran Bayramova joined the Bolshevik Party in October 1919.

=== The first women organization ===
In 1920, Bayramova opened a women's club in her two-room apartment and became its first director. The club offered educational courses, sewing workshops, and a children's garden named "Sunbul". It was the first women's club in the East. Later, the club was named "Ali Bayramov club", in honor of Ali Bayramov by government authorities. The club was a cultural and political center for women in Azerbaijan.

Jeyran Bayramova participated in the congresses of Azerbaijani women held in 1921, 1957, 1967, and 1972, as well as the first congress of working women of the Transcaucasus held in Baku in 1922.

=== Arrest and afterlife ===
After Ali Bayramov was shot in 1920, Jeyran Bayramova married Oruc Bayramov. Oruc Bayramov was arrested by the People's Commissariat for Internal Affairs in 1935 on charges of engaging in counter-revolution propaganda and was shot on July 31, 1937. After this, on September 8, 1937, Jeyran Bayramova was arrested for 8 years as the spouse of an "enemy of the people" and was sent to the Akmola prison camp in Kazakhstan. Based on the decision of the Criminal Cases Collegium of the Supreme Court of the Republic dated December 14, 1955, she was acquitted.

In March 1960, Bayramova went to Moscow to participate in the celebrations for International Women's Day. There, she was awarded the Order of Lenin by the Presidium of the Supreme Soviet of the USSR. In 1967, she was awarded the Order of Lenin for the second time, and in 1968, she received the Jubilee Medal established for the 50th anniversary of the Soviet Armed Forces. Bayramova was also honored multiple times within the party for her service with various jubilee medals and honorary diplomas.

On March 30, 1976, Bayramova was awarded the Order of the October Revolution for her revolutionary activity, past political and social activism, and her 80th anniversary of birth.

She died in December 1987.

== Literature ==
- Sultanova, Akima (1973). Jeyran Bayramova (biographic ocherk) (in Azerbaijani (Cyrillic script)). Baku: Azernashr.
- Bayramova, Jeyran (1983). Xatirələrim [My memories] (in Azerbaijani (Cyrillic script)). Baku: Azernashr.
