= Alaviyya Babayeva =

Author and translator (1921–2004)

- Born: 12 August 1921 Baku, Azerbaijan
- Died: 23 September 2014 (aged 93)
- Occupation: Writer

Alaviyya Babayeva Hanifa Kizi (12 August 1921 – 23 September 2014) was a prose author, translator of contemporary Russian literature, and publicist.

== Early life and education ==
Babayeva graduated from Baku State University. She began writing in 1936, with a story entitled "Two Lives".

== Works ==
- I am not alone
- My Teacher (Book for children)
- Country Roads (Book for children)
- Again Spring (Book for children)
- Mulberry Tree (Story collection)
- Shadow (Story collection)
- People and Fates (novel)
- Where Are You, Friend? (novel)
- Looking for You
- Maybe There Will Be No Tomorrow
