= Women in Uzbekistan =

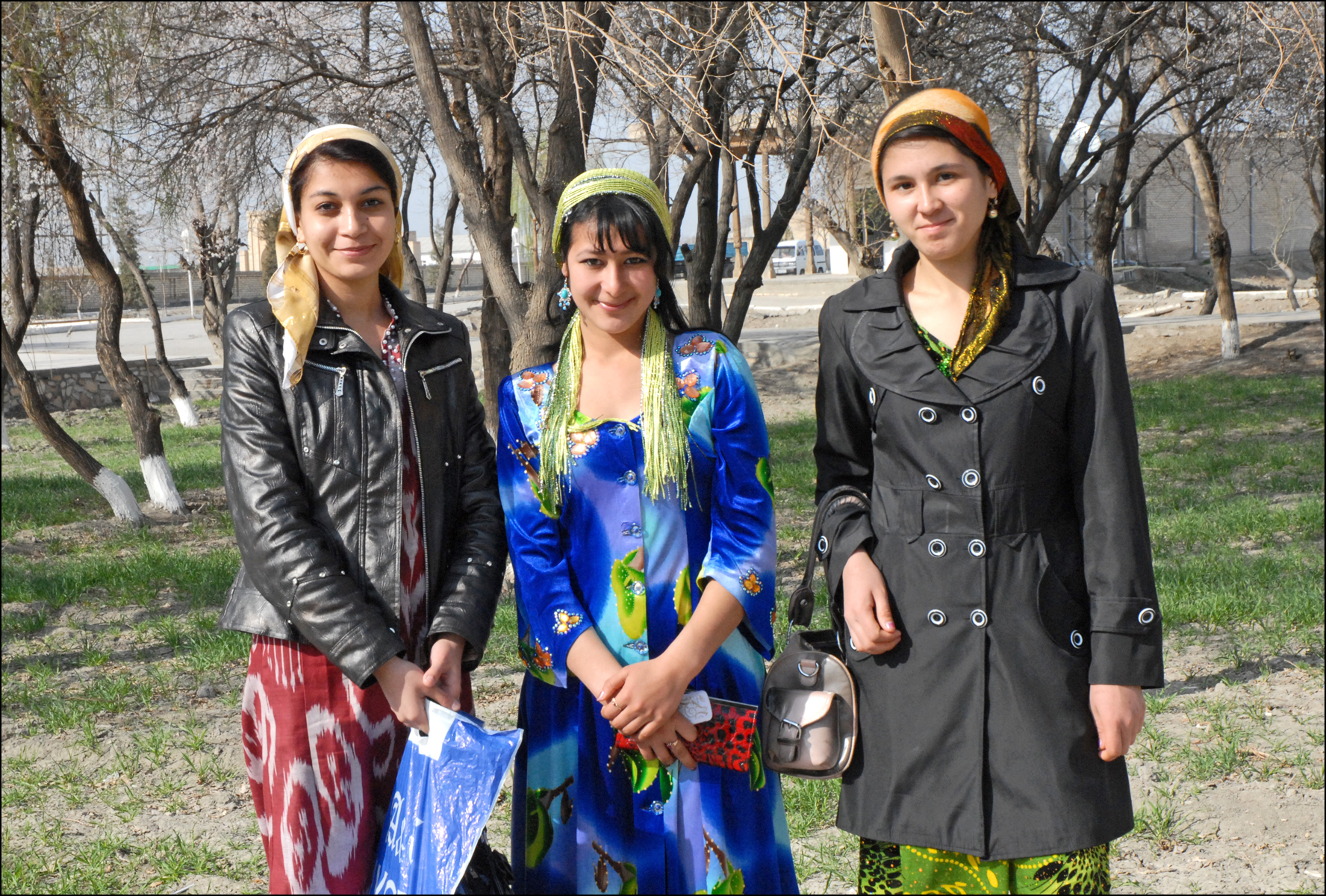
- Women in Uzbekistan

General statistics
- Maternal mortality (per 100,000): 28
- Women in parliament: 32% (2020)
- Women over 25 with secondary education: 65.9% (2010)
- Women in labour force: 51% (2014)

Gender Inequality Index
- Value: 0.227 (2021)
- Rank: 56th out of 191

Global Gender Gap Index
- Value: NR
- Rank: NR

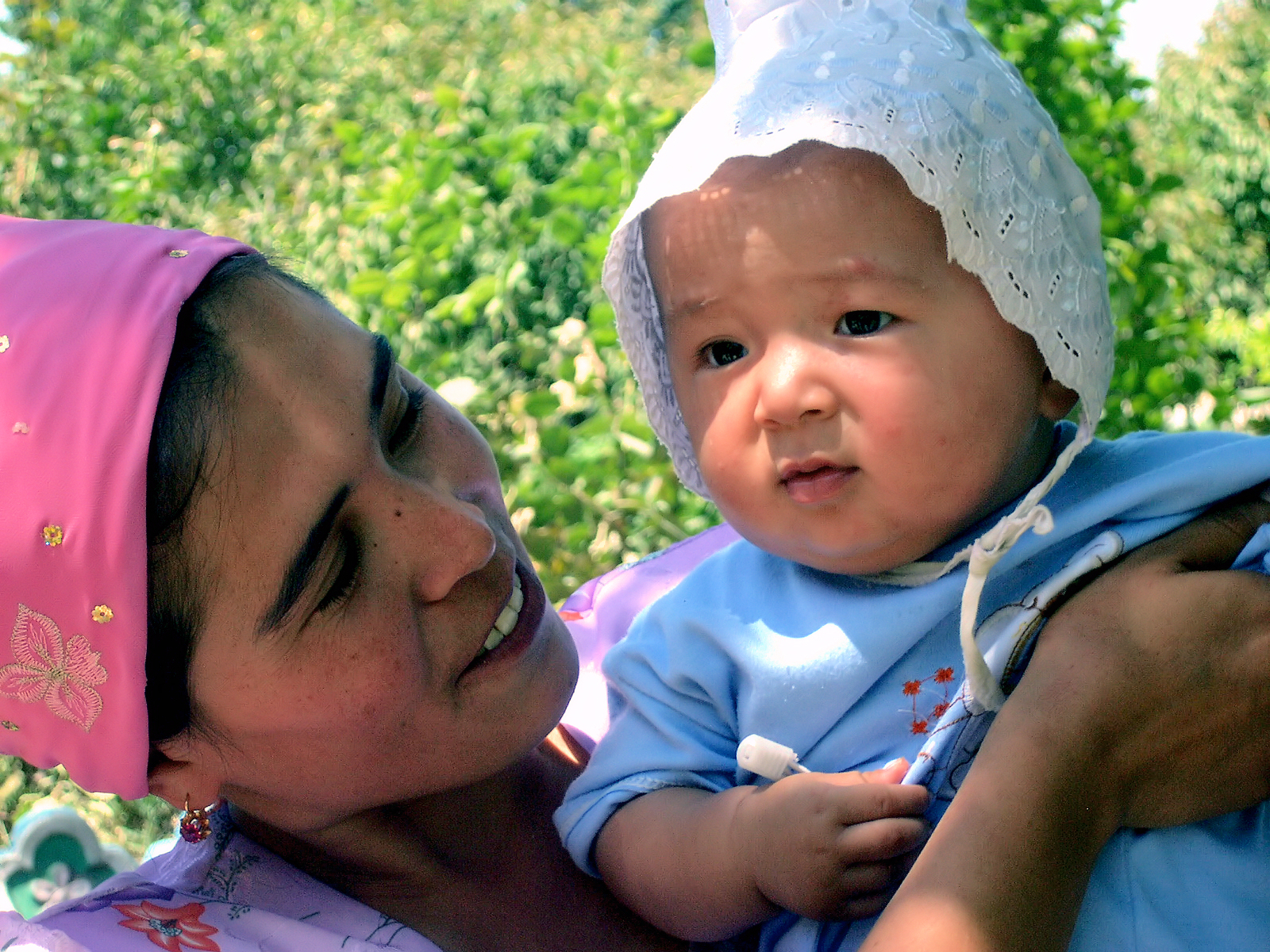
Woman with child

Women in Uzbekistan are subject to restrictions imposed by local tradition, religion and social norms.

== Legal rights and political representation ==
As of 2004 Uzbekistan’s election law requires political parties to nominate at least 30 percent female candidates for the parliament. However, the underrepresentation of women is endemic at all levels of government. Uzbekistan has universal suffrage; however, "according to data from surveys conducted by the Public Opinion Centre, 64% of urban and 50% of rural women consider that men have greater opportunities for implementing their rights in the political sphere".

== Healthcare ==
The availability of contraceptives and maternal healthcare is mixed. 62.3% of women were using free contraceptives in 2003. However, the UN estimates that about 13.7% of women in Uzbekistan who would like to prevent, or delay, their next pregnancy are unable to do so because of limited access to contraceptives. In 2000, there were approximately 20,900 midwives in the country.

Forced sterilization of women is practiced in Uzbekistan. A BBC World Service "Assignment" report on 12 April 2012 uncovered evidence that women are being sterilised, often without their knowledge, in an effort by the government to control the population.

== Mental health ==
In 2001 it was estimated that approximately 500 women a year kill themselves because of abusive situations. Self-immolation is a common form of suicide.

== Economic opportunity ==
"Gender roles in the economy changed during the Soviet period and continue to change in independence." While the Uzbek state has programs in place to help increase economic opportunities for women, there are persistent problems. For example, the labor market is sex-segregated, and women are usually paid lower wages. "Unskilled personnel in the non-production sector are comprised virtually entirely of women.” Women also cannot be used for night time or overtime work. In 2023 the Uzbek Government passed a law offering some protections against harassment and abuse. Mothers with disabled children or many children can retire at 50, which is up to five years earlier than the stipulated retirement age (55).

== Abuse of women ==
Forced marriage through bride kidnapping occurs in parts of the country, especially Karakalpakstan. Bride kidnappings are believed to be tied to economic instability. Whereas weddings can be prohibitively expensive, kidnappings avoid both the cost of the ceremony and any bride price. Some scholars report that less desirable males with inferior educations or drug or alcohol problems are more likely to kidnap their brides.

The UN has recognized some efforts of the government to curtail human trafficking. For example, telephone hotlines are available for trafficking victims, and trafficking carries a jail sentence of five to eight years. However, trafficking still persists, as Uzbekistan is both a supplier and consumer of trafficked women.”Trafficking occurs as an extension of the ‘shuttle’ trade. The women are sent as tourists with promises of employment as nannies, tutors or baby-sitters, but they often end up working in the sex industry.”

== See also ==
- Compulsory sterilization in Uzbekistan
