= Lenins Weg =

- Founded: 1932
- Ceased publication: 1936
- Political alignment: Communist
- Language: German language
- Headquarters: Helenendorf (1932-1936), Baku (1936)

Lenins Weg ('Path of Lenin') was a German-language newspaper published in Soviet Azerbaijan. It was published from Helenendorf between 1932 and 1936, and in 1936 from Baku. Lenins Weg functioned as a republic-level newspaper for the German population in Soviet Azerbaijan.

== See also ==
- Bauer und Arbeiter
