= Baş Göynük =

- Municipality
- Location within Azerbaijan Location within Shaki-Zagatala Economic Region
- Coordinates: 41°19′22″N 47°06′48″E
- Country: Azerbaijan
- Rayon: Shaki

Population
  - Total: 13,260 (2,009)
- Time zone: UTC+4 (AZT)
  - Summer (DST): UTC+5 (AZT)

Baş Göynük (also, Baş Köynük and Bash Gëynyuk) is a village and municipality in the Shaki Rayon of Azerbaijan. It is the largest settlement of Sheki region. It has a population of 13260 (2009)
