= Bauer und Arbeiter =

- Type: Weekly
- Publisher: German section, Communist Party (bolshevik) of Azerbaijan
- Editor-in-chief: A. A. Erfurt
- Founded: July 1924
- Ceased publication: November 1924
- Political alignment: Communist
- Language: German language
- Headquarters: Baku
- Circulation: 2,200
- OCLC number: 39388774

Bauer und Arbeiter ('Peasant and Worker') was a German-language communist newspaper published in Baku in 1924. The newspaper was launched in July 1924. It was the organ of the German Section of the Central Committee of the Communist Party (bolshevik) of Azerbaijan. The newspaper was published weekly. A. A. Erfurt served as the editor of Bauer und Arbeiter. Its editorial board consisted of reporters and other staff members of the newspaper.

== History ==
In March 1924 the Central Secretariat of the Communist Party (bolshevik) of Azerbaijan instructed its German Section to set up a publication to be distributed amongst German colonists. But the preparations for the setting up of a German-language newspaper in the Caucasus were marred by difficulties. There was a lack of skilled German-speaking staff and German Gothic fonts had to be purchased from Georgia and Ganja. Between March and April 1924 a publication called 'Rote Bauer' ('Red Peasant') was circulated amongst German colonists, but its circulation was limited to a hundred copies. Moreover, it only covered rural issues. Bauer und Arbeiter on the other hand became a regular newspaper covering both urban and rural issues.

Bauer und Arbeiter was a significant feature in the organizing of ideological work amongst the German population in the Transcaucasian Socialist Federative Soviet Republic. It covered domestic, economic and cultural issues of the urban and rural German population of Azerbaijan and Georgia. For its material the newspaper relied on workers and peasant correspondents (8 workers correspondents in Baku, 3 in Tiflis, 15 peasant correspondents in rural Azerbaijan, 7 in Georgia). The focus of the newspaper was more directed towards household and day-to-day issues than politics and was characterized by a balanced tone, a fact that made it popular amongst German colonists.

During its initial phase, Bauer und Arbeiter had circulation of around 2,200. Most of the printed copies were distributed amongst Germans in Baku and German colonists in Azerbaijan, and a lesser number in Georgia and amongst Moscow-based institutions. An editorial office was opened in Tiflis, managed by the German Section of the Communist Party (bolshevik) of Georgia.

Initially, the lack of a printing press of its own limited the expansion of the newspaper. It was printed at the Poligraftresta publishing company, and there were frequent delays. In September 1924 a private publishing company named 'Bauer und Arbeiter' was set up in Baku by Erfurt, P. Kulfeldt and Schoenberg, with the stated goal of printing material for the German Section of the Communist Party.

Whilst the newspaper was rapidly gaining readership during its short lifespan, Bauer und Arbeiter was promptly closed down on 5 November 1924.

== See also ==
- Lenins Weg
