= Krestyanka (magazine) =

Russian monthly magazine

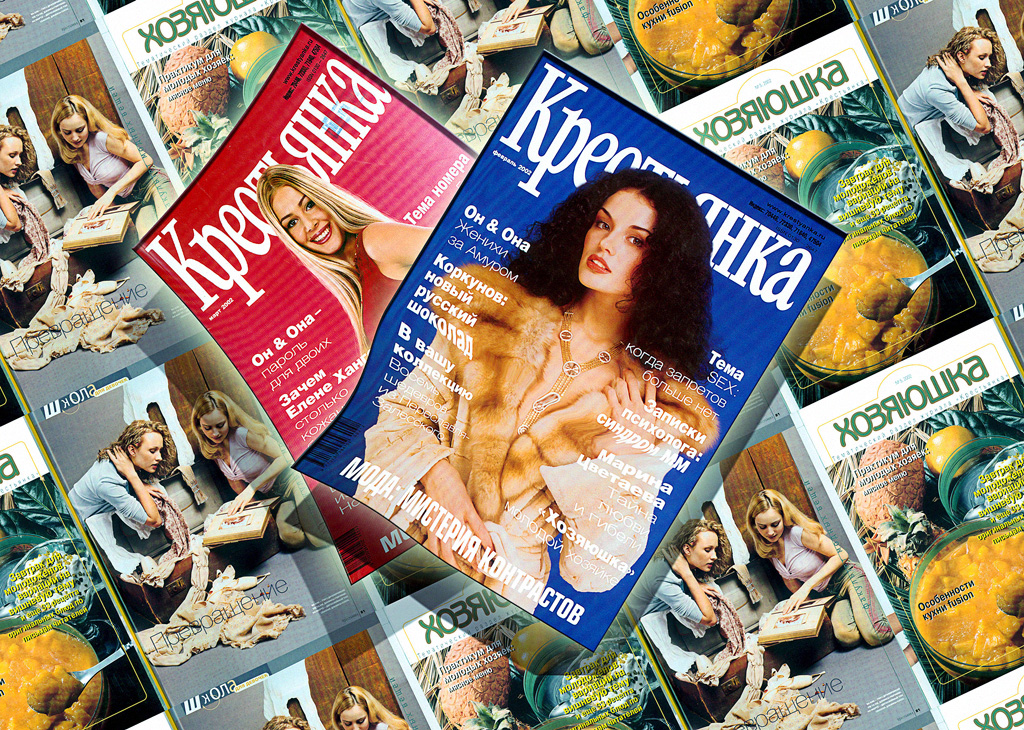
- Categories: Feminism, fashion
- Frequency: Monthly
- Founded: 1922
- Country: Soviet Union Russia
- Based in: Moscow
- Language: Russian
- Website: krestyanka.ru
- ISSN: 0130-2647 (print); 2712-9977 (web)

Krestyanka (Russian: Крестьянка) is a monthly magazine published in the Soviet Union and later in Russia.

== History ==
The magazine was founded in 1922 as a Zhenotdel, a department of the Central Committee and local committees of the Communist Party of the Soviet Union.

The peasant woman publishes articles by Mikhail Kalinin, Nadezhda Krupskaya, Maria Ulyanova, Anna Ulyanova, Anatoly Lunacharsky, opens her columns by Demyan Bedny, Maxim Gorky, Alexander Serafimovich, Aleksandr Tvardovsky.

In 1972, the magazine was awarded the Order of Lenin.

The magazine's website was registered in 1999, and later as an electronic media.

The print edition ceased to be published in 2015, but the official print version of the media was liquidated in 2022.

In 2022, the magazine turned 100 years old.
