= Zərqava, Quba =

Zərqava
- Municipality
- Location within Azerbaijan
- Coordinates: 41°14′45″N 48°42′13″E
- Country: Azerbaijan
- Rayon: Quba

Population
  - Total: 1,418
- Time zone: UTC+4 (AZT)
  - Summer (DST): UTC+5 (AZT)

Zərqava (also, Zargova) is a village and municipality in the Quba Rayon of Azerbaijan. It has a population of 1,418. The municipality consists of the villages of Zərqava and Xaspolad.
