= Gazanfar Musabekov =

Azerbaijani revolutionary and Soviet politician

- غضنفر موسی‌بگوف; Газанфар Мусабеков
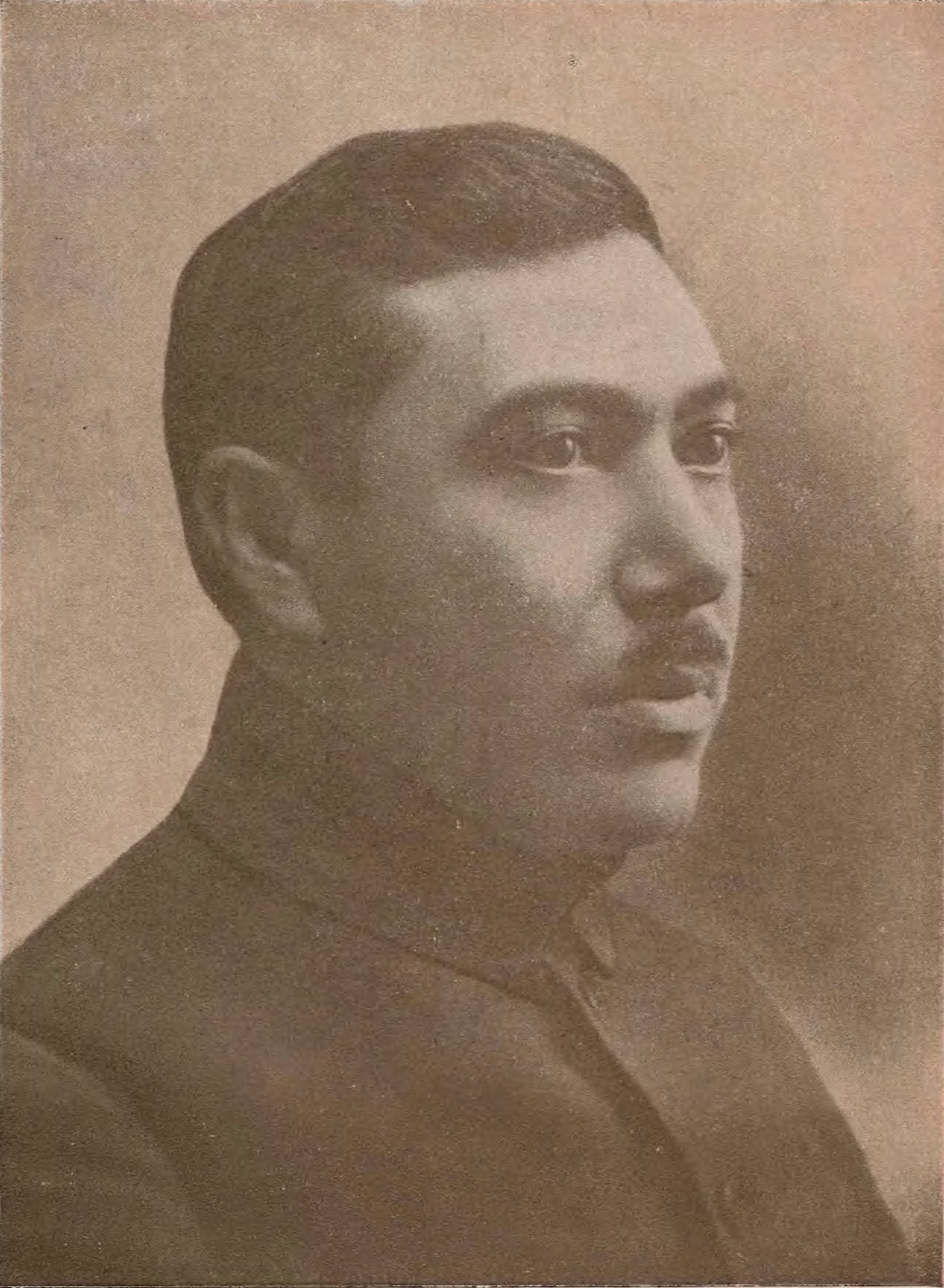
- Musabekov in 1935

Chairman of the Central Executive Committee of the Azerbaijan SSR
- In office 1929–1931
- First Secretary: Nikolai Gikalo
- Preceded by: Nariman Narimanov
- Succeeded by: Dadash Bunyadzade

Personal details
- Born: 26 July 1888 Pirəbədil, Caucasus Viceroyalty
- Died: 9 February 1938 (aged 49) Tbilisi, Georgian SSR, Soviet Union
- Party: Communist Party of the Soviet Union
- Education: Saint Vladimir University

Gazanfar Mahmud oghlu Musabeyov or Musabekov (Azerbaijani: غضنفر محمود اوغلی موسی‌بگوف, Qəzənfər Mahmud oğlu Musabəyov, 26 July [O.S. 14 July] 1888 – 9 February 1938) was an Azerbaijani Bolshevik revolutionary and Soviet politician. He was Chairman of the Central Executive Committee of the Azerbaijan SSR from 1929 to 1931, and headed the government of the Transcaucasian SFSR from 1931 to 1936. During the Great Purge, Musabekov was arrested (June 1937), accused of plotting against the Soviet state, sentenced to death and executed by a firing squad on 9 February 1938, after his mother. His sister Ayna Sultanova and brother-in-law Hamid Sultanov, both high ranking Azerbaijani Bolshevik revolutionaries and politicians, were also executed in 1938.

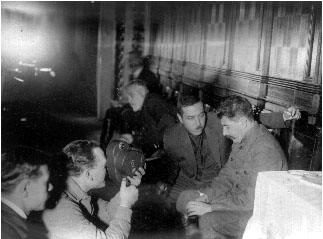
Musabekov with Stalin during a speech of the Central Executive Committee of the Soviet Union in December 1928.

An Azerbaijani cargo ship is named after him.
