= Ali Bayramov Club =

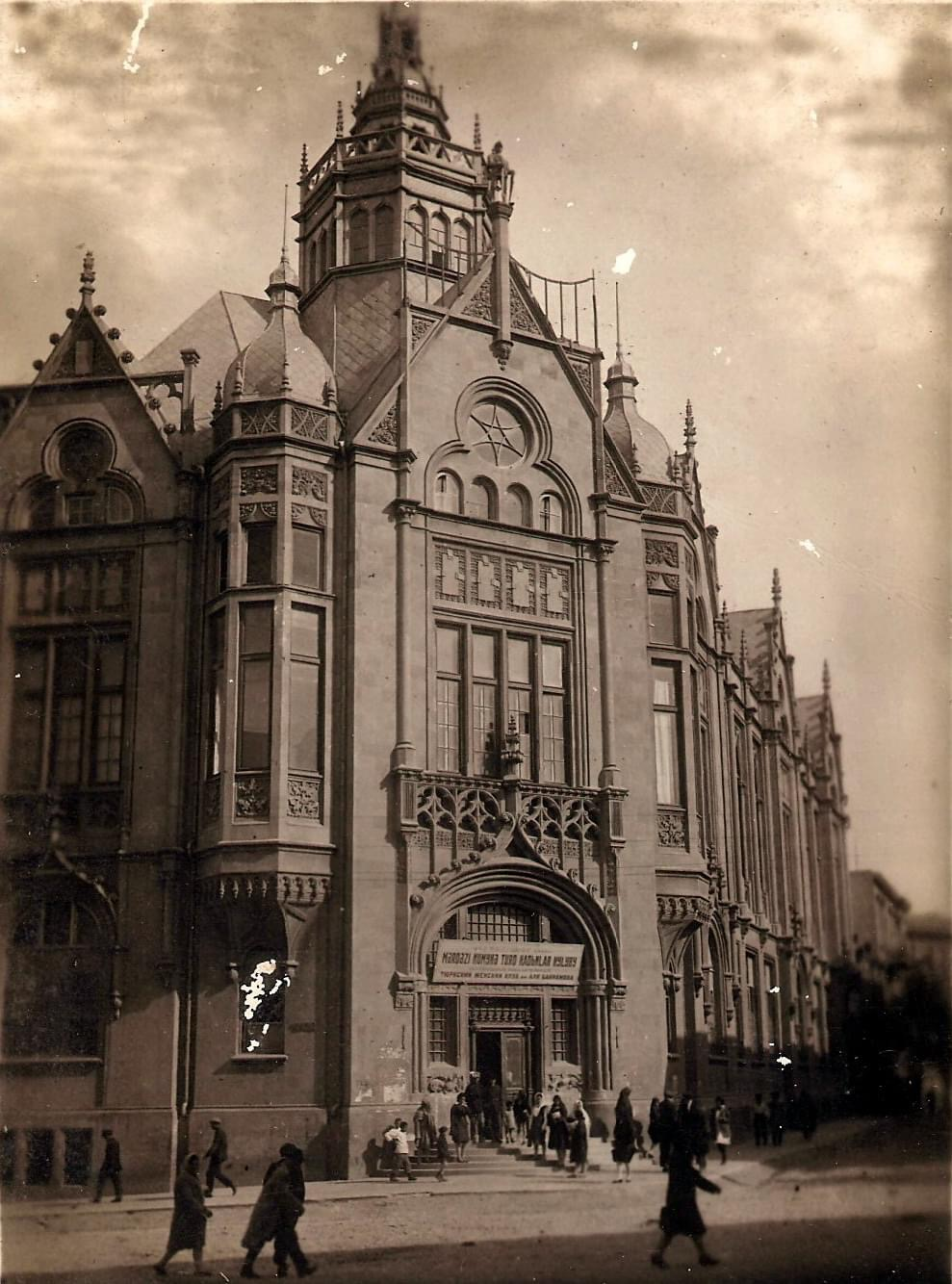
Palace of Happiness (1920's)

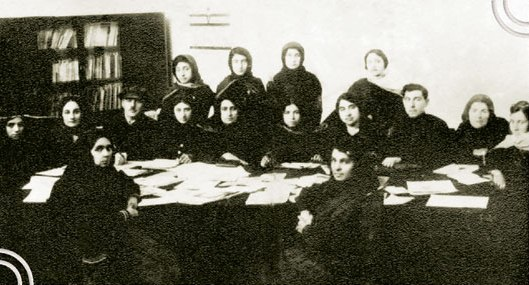
Members of the board of the Ali Bayramov Club

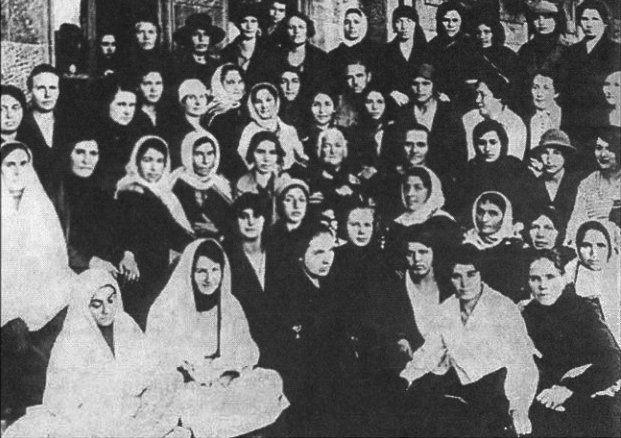
Clara Zetkin at the Ali Bayramov Club, Baku, 1924

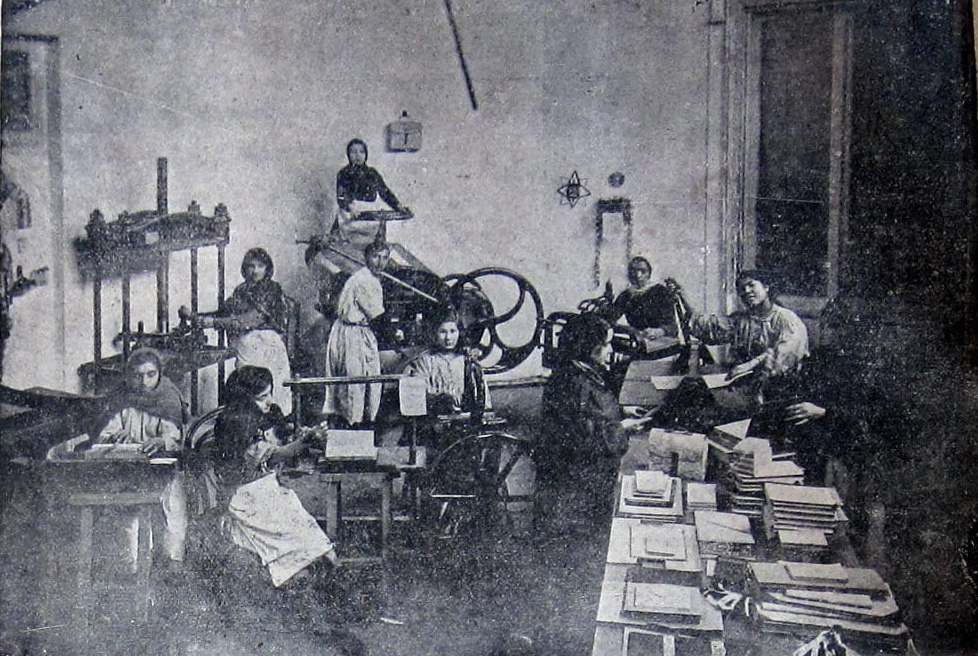
Bindery next to Ali Bayramov Working Turkish Women's Club

The Ali Bayramov Club was the first club for women in Baku, Azerbaijan. The club offered a variety of vocational skills and training to women, in addition to cultural and leisure activities. Its main focus was campaigning for women's unveiling and literacy.

== History ==
=== Origins ===
The Ali Bayramov Women's Club, active in Baku and the surrounding regions, was opened in 1920 under the direction of the People's Commissariat for Education. The club was originally founded as a literacy and sewing circle by Jeyran Bayramova with the aim of enlightening Azeri women. The club was named after her brother-in-law, whom she married after the death of her sister, Ali Bayramov, who had encouraged her educational pursuits when her parents had not. Ali Bayramov, a leading Azeri Bolshevik, encouraged his wife to be active in the communist women's movement. Bayramova first proposed the club to her school friends during her husband's funeral shortly after his death in March 1920.

The club aimed to attract a cross-ethnic, working-class following, working closely with the Zhenotdel. They even went as far as excluding those who were from bourgeoise backgrounds.

The club also offered entertainment and socialization to women, which was previously inaccessible to women largely confined to working in the home or visiting the mosque. There was a range of cultural, sports, and leisure activities, including plays and musical events performed by troupes of women, film screenings, game rooms (chess, backgammon, billiards), and dance classes.

=== 1920s ===
The club was a training centre for cadres of women going to organize regional clubs, unveiling campaigns, and literacy courses outside of the capital. The first group of women attracted to the club were quickly enrolled in literacy classes. After a few months the trainees had to take an exam. Some were concerned after having heard rumours that those who received good grades on the exam would be sent to work in villages around Azerbaijan. Enthusiasm grew among the trainees, many of them fearlessly embracing the challenge. Some of the women excitedly thought: "We came to the club, started a sewing workshop, removed our veils, abolished illiteracy, and now what? After all, there are other women who also need help." Thus, trainees who could prove their literacy were offered jobs at provincial clubs to educate, train, politicize, and enlighten local women. By the early 1930s, there were 103 such clubs.

The club received backing from the early Bolshevik regime. Most importantly for the club, in 1922, Soviet authorities allowed the club to occupy the extravagant former home of the wealthy Mukhtarov family, now called the Palace of Happiness.

The Ali Bayramov Women's Club was involved in many different spheres and had the overarching goal of transforming every aspect of women's lives. When German Marxist theorist and women's rights activist Clara Zetkin visited the Ali Bayramov Club in 1924, she was greatly impressed, calling it a hub of gathering revolutionary forces.

On May 26, 1925, a ceremonial meeting was held in the assembly hall of the Ali Bayramov Club to commemorate the club's fifth anniversary.

The club's aim of unveiling Azeri women found greater support following the launch of Joseph Stalin's Hujums. These were attempts by the Stalinist regime to make Azeri culture more Soviet, most importantly through the suppression of Islam. Veiling was banned in 1929 as a result.

=== Challenges and closure ===
The founders faced challenges early on attracting women with organizational skills, especially given that most required permission from their husbands to participate and the male communist cadres were ambivalent towards the project.

The club also faced attacks from the wider Azeri community. One incident included a reported attack on a Bayramov meeting with boiling water and dogs.

The club was closed down in 1937, as consequence of Stalin's increasing disillusionment with women's issues, declaring in 1930 that all women's issues were "solved", meaning clubs like the Ali Bayramov Club were considered unnecessary. Additionally, Stalin reversed many of the successes of the early regime in terms of female emancipation. For example, in 1936, Stalin recriminalized abortion, banned female homosexuality and made divorce more costly. This made the survival of the club near impossible, although the club did survive a full seven years after the closure of the Zhenotdel.

=== Legacy ===
The sewing workshop which was started at the Ali Bayramov Club originally employed seven workers, but eventually grew and was turned into the Ali Bayramov Textile Factory, where 1,500 women still work today.

The club also laid the groundwork for the increased education of Azeri women, especially in regard to the occupation of midwifery. The club's midwifery course was eventually turned into the School of Midwifery in Baku, for example. It also offered vocational training included telephone operating, accounting, nursing, midwifery, and sewing and weaving.

The club laid the foundation for the emancipation of Azeri women in a conservative society. Today, the literacy rate of Azeri women is 99% and they have full equality under Azeri law.
