= Hamid Sultanov =

Soviet Azerbaijani politician

- Həmid Sultanov
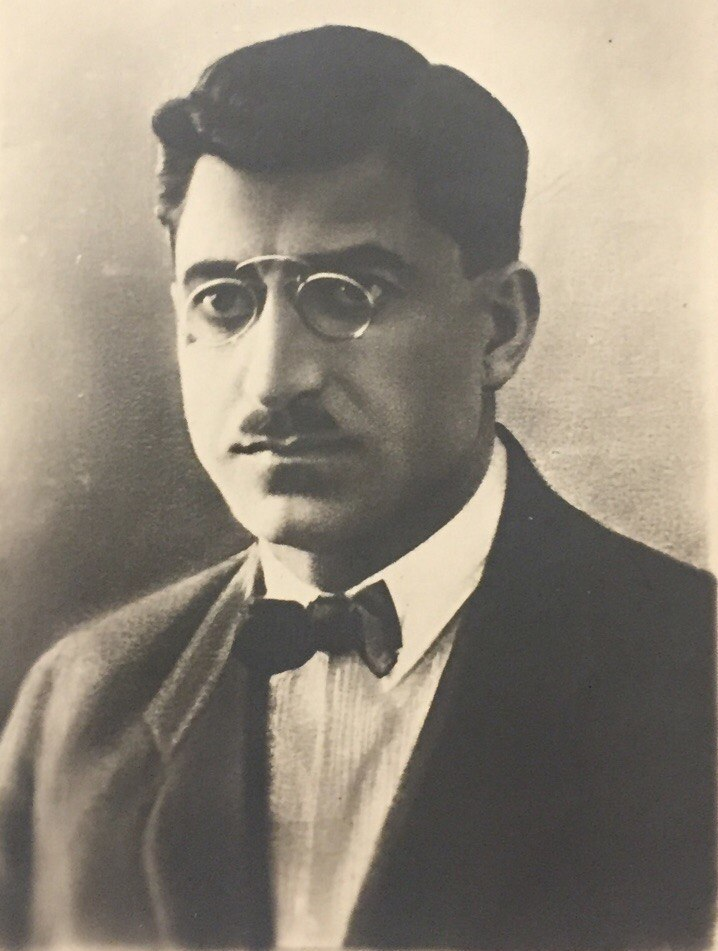

Chair of the Council of People's Commissars of the Nakhchivan ASSR
- In office 1925–1929

People's Commissar for Internal Affairs of the Azerbaijan SSR
- In office 1920–1921

Personal details
- Born: 26 May 1889 Shynykh-Ayrum, Kazakh Uyezd, Elisabethpol Governorate, Russian Empire
- Died: 1938 (aged 48–49) Baku, Azerbaijan, Soviet Union
- Party: Communist Party of the Soviet Union
- Spouse: Ayna Sultanova
- Children: Vladlen Sultanov
- Occupation: Commissar, statesman

Hamid Hasan oghlu Sultanov (Azerbaijani: حمید حسن اوغلی سلطانوف, Həmid Həsən oğlu Sultanov; 26 May 1889 – 1938) was a Soviet Azerbaijani politician, People's Commissar for Internal Affairs of the Azerbaijan SSR and later Chair of the Council of People's Commissars of the Nakhchivan ASSR.

== Life and career ==
Hamid Sultanov was born on 26 May 1889 in the village of Shynykh-Ayrum, Kazakh Uyezd (present-day Gadabay Rayon, Azerbaijan). In autumn 1906, Sultanov moved to Baku where he was hired as a plumber's assistant on Balakhany oilfields. In 1907, he joined the Bolshevik wing of the Russian Social-Democratic Party. In 1913, he graduated from a polytechnicum in Leipzig, after which he returned to Baku. He participated in the general labour strike in Baku in 1914. In 1917, Sultanov joined Hummet and later that year became an executive member of the Baku Council. Beginning in 1918, he fulfilled various duties with the Bolshevik administration of Baku. After the Battle of Baku, resulting in the Bolshevik's temporary loss of control of the city, Sultanov relocated to Astrakhan, Russia, where he headed the Muslim bureau of the Astrakhan regional committee of the Communist Party.

In the summer of 1919, he was sent to the South Caucasus on an underground mission with Dadash Bunyadzade and Viktor Naneishvili. In February 1920, he joined the Communist Party of Azerbaijan and the Central Military Headquarters of the Baku branch of the Russian Communist Party.

On 28 April 1920, the Red Army invaded Azerbaijan and the Military Revolutionary Committee of Azerbaijan, of which Sultanov was a member, became the sole authority in the country. He was appointed People's Commissar (Minister) for Internal Affairs. He was directly involved in carrying out repressive measures against leaders of the short-lived Democratic Republic of Azerbaijan and namely in ordering the execution of hundreds of people arrested for their involvement in the 1920 Ganja revolt.

Hamid Sultanov was married to Ayna Sultanova, sister of the Chair of the Central Executive Committee of Azerbaijan SSR Gazanfar Musabekov, and People's Commissar of Justice in 1934–1937. All three of them were arrested on counter-revolution charges and executed by firing squad in 1938.
