= Ayna Sultanova =

Azerbaijani activist and statesperson

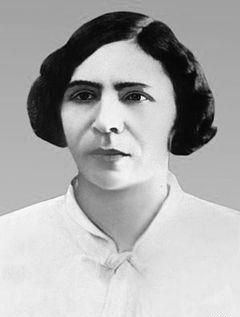
- Ayna Sultanova

People's Commissar of Justice of the Azerbaijan SSR
- In office 1938–1938

Deputy People's Commissar of Education
- In office 1937–1938

Personal details
- Born: 1895 Pirabadil, Kuba uyezd, Baku Governorate, Russian Empire
- Died: 1938 (aged 42–43) Baku, Azerbaijan
- Party: Communist Party of the Soviet Union
- Spouse: Hamid Sultanov
- Children: Vladlen Sultanov
- Occupation: Commissar, statesperson

Ayna Mahmud gizi Sultanova (1895 – 1938) was an Azerbaijani Communist party activist and statesperson. She was one of the first Azerbaijani female revolutionaries and in 1938, became Azerbaijani female cabinet minister.

== Life and career ==
Ayna Sultanova (née Musabeyova) was born in 1895 in the village of Pirəbədil, 15 kilometres east of the modern-day city of Shabran. She was the sister of Gazanfar Musabekov who later became a Bolshevik revolutionary and Chair of the Council of People's Commissars of Azerbaijan, the highest governing body of the republic. In 1912, she graduated from Saint Nino Gymnasium in Baku and later briefly taught at that school. In 1917, she became interested in Bolshevik ideas and on 1918, joined the Russian Communist Party (which later became the Communist Party of the Soviet Union). In 1919, she moved to Astrakhan, then to Moscow where she worked at the Middle Eastern bureau of the People's Commissariat of Russia for Foreign Affairs. In 1920, she went back to already Sovietised Azerbaijan and until 1930, worked in different administrative positions related to women's affairs. In 1923, she also became the editor-in-chief of "Sharg gadini", a Communist magazine aimed at women's emancipation.

Between 1937 and 1938, Sultanova worked as Deputy People's Commissar (Minister) of Education, then as the People's Commissar of Justice. She was also a student at the Institute of Red Professors. For her services to the Soviet state, Sultanova was awarded the Order of the Red Banner of Labour.

She was married to Hamid Sultanov, Chair of the Council of People's Commissars of the Nakhchivan ASSR. In 1938, in the wake of the Great Purge, both of them, along with Ayna Sultanova's brother Gazanfar Musabekov, were arrested on counter-revolution charges and executed by firing squad shortly afterwards.

There is a street named after Ayna Sultanova in Ganja and a monument dedicated to her in Baku.
